= Aohan =

Aohan may refer to:

- Aohan Banner, Inner Mongolia, China
- Aohans, Southern Mongol subgroup in Aohan Banner
