= Eidu =

Manchu name
- Manchu script: ᡥᠣᡥᠣᡵᡳ
- Möllendorff: eidu

Chinese name
- Chinese: 额亦都
Transcriptions
Standard Mandarin
- Hanyu Pinyin: é yì dū

Pronunciation respelling name
- Pronunciation respelling: Ə-ee-doo

Eidu Baturu (1562–1622) was a Manchu officer and a member of the Niohuru clan.

== Early life ==
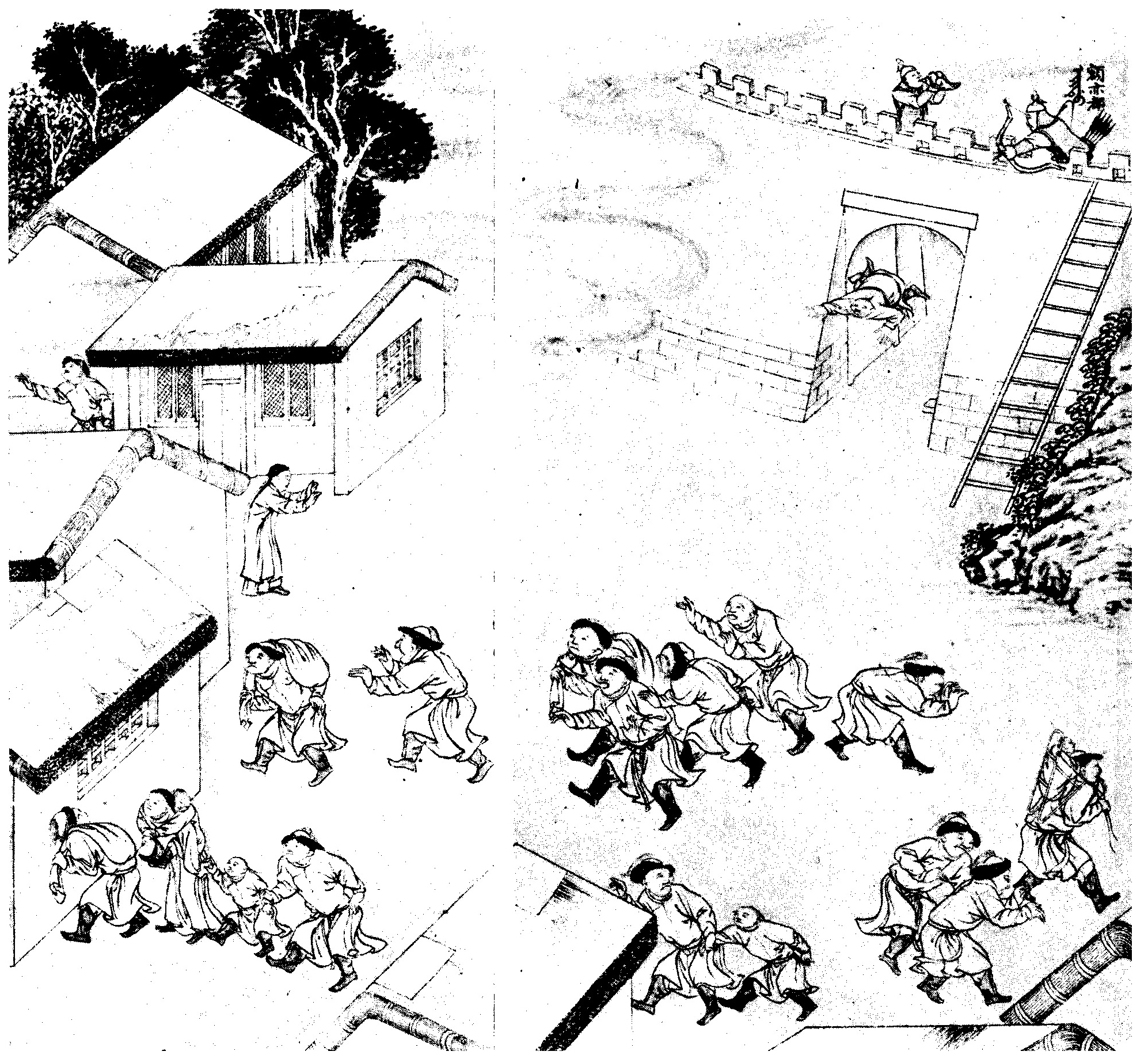
Manchu Veritable Record depicted Eidu's (archer top right) victory at Balda, earning him the warrior title

Eidu's grandfather had established a home in a valley of the Yengge ("wild grape") mountain range, which formed the easternmost spur of the Changbai Mountains, in the southeast area of the present-day Jilin.

Eidu's parents were murdered in a feud when he was very young, and he escaped only through the protection of a neighbour. At the age of twelve, he took revenge by killing his parents' murderer, after which he fled to the home of an aunt, who was married to the chieftain of the fortress of Giyamuhu. Here he became a close friend of the chieftain's son, Gahasan Hashu, who later married Nurhaci's sister.

== Military career ==
In 1580, Nurhaci, then twenty-one years old, passed through Giyamuhu and stopped at the chieftain's home. The eighteen-year-old Eidu was so impressed by his qualities of leadership that he attached himself to Nurhaci and remained his close associate for more than forty years.

In 1583, he accompanied Nurhaci and proved himself an able fighter. Four years later he captured the town of Barda, and received from Nurhaci the title of baturu, "conquering hero." After a long and successful career of military achievement, he joined the Bordered Yellow Banner in 1615 and was appointed as one of the five principal dignitaries in government the following year. In 1617 he captured a number of Ming fortresses in company with Anfiyanggu, and in 1619, was at the forefront of the decisive battles waged by Nurhaci against the three armies of Yang Hao. As a reward for his services, he was given a sister of Nurhaci as one of his wives.

Eidu's second son, Daki, was brought up in the royal establishment and married the fifth daughter of Nurhaci. When Daki spoke out against Nurhaci's sons, Eidu put him to death, prompting Nurhaci to call Eidu his most patriotic officer.

== Death and legacy ==
Eidu died in 1621. In 1634, he was posthumously awarded the rank of a viscount, which was inherited by his sixteenth son, Ebilun. In 1636, his rank was raised to that of duke (non-hereditary). His name was entered in the Imperial Ancestral Temple, his tomb was moved to a location near that of Nurhaci. A stone tablet was erected in front of the tomb in 1654. The rank of viscount was taken from Ebilun in 1637, due to a misdemeanour, but was restored in 1713 and given to his son, Yende. After Yende was made a duke in 1724, the title of viscount was inherited by other branches of Eidu's family.

Eidu had sixteen sons, among whom the most prominent were the youngest, Ebilun, and the eighth, Turgei, who took part in many military campaigns during Hong Taiji's reign and was highly regarded for his bravery. Among the grandsons of Eidu the most notable was Centai, who served as a Grand Secretary in 1651, and was made a viscount while commanding the Manchu forces in Hunan against Ming generals. Many other descendants of Eidu held office throughout the Qing period.

== Family ==
- Madame (夫人), of a certain clan (某氏)
  - Banxi (班席), first son
  - Tuerxi (图尔席), ninth son
- Madame (夫人), of the Gioro clan (觉罗氏)
  - Daqi (达启), second son
  - Cherge (车尔格), third son
  - Dalong'ai (达隆), sixth son
  - Maohai (冒海), seventh son
  - Turgei (图尔格; d. 1645), eight son
  - Yierdeng (益而登), tenth son
  - Esēn (额森), twelfth son
  - Chahao'er (超哈而), thirteenth son
  - Ge'erte (格而特), fourteenth son
  - Suohuan (索欢), fifteenth son
- Madame (夫人), of the Tongyin clan (佟殷氏)
  - Handai (涵岱), fourth aom
  - Adahai (阿达海), fifth son
- Madame (夫人), of the Aisin-Gioro clan (愛新覺羅氏; 1595 – June/July 1659), personal Mukushen (穆庫什), daughter of Nurhaci
  - Ebilun (遏必隆, d. 1673), sixteen son; the Kangxi Emperor's regent
  - Fiyanggū (费扬古), seventeen son
  - Lady Niohuru (钮祜禄氏), second daughter
    - Married Nikan of the Aisin-Gioro clan, son of Cuyen
- Concubine (妾), of the Shi clan (室氏)
  - Aode (熬德), eleventh son
- Unknown
  - Consort Yuan (钮祜禄氏; 1593–1612), first daughter
    - Married Hong Taiji of the Aisin-Gioro clan, and had issues (one son)
  - Lady Niohuru (钮祜禄氏), third daughter
  - Lady Niohuru (钮祜禄氏), fourth daughter
    - Married Jirgalang of the Aisin-Gioro clan, and had no issue
  - Lady Niohuru (钮祜禄氏), fifth daughter
  - Lady Niohuru (钮祜禄氏), sixth daughter
  - Lady Niohuru (钮祜禄氏), seventh daughter
  - Lady Niohuru (钮祜禄氏), eight daughter
