= Consort Ji (Hong Taiji) =

Second wife of Hong Taiji

Consort Ji 繼妃
- Spouse: Hong Taiji
- Issue Detail: Hooge, Prince Suwu of the First Rank
- House: Ula-Nara (by birth); Aisin-Gioro (by marriage)
- Father: Bokdo

Consort Ji, of the Ula-Nara clan, was the second wife of Hong Taiji.

== Life ==
=== Family background ===
- Father: Bokdo (博克多; d. 1607); held the title of beile (貝勒)
  - Grandfather: Buyan (布延; 1554–1603); founder of the Ula state

=== Wanli era ===
The exact date of Lady Ula-Nara's birth is unknown.

Her father and uncle were beheaded during the Battle of Wujieyan, which was part of Nurhaci's wars of unification. She probably became Hong Taiji's wife afterward.

In 1609, Lady Ula-Nara gave birth to Hong Taiji's eldest son, Hooge, followed in 1611 by his second son, Loge, and in 1621 by his eldest daughter, Princess Aohan of the First Rank.

The date of her death is unknown, though she most likely passed away before Hong Taiji inherited the Later Jin throne in 1926. She wasn't posthumously honored as empress.

At some later point, Lady Ula-Nara gained the unofficial title "Consort Ji" (繼妃; lit. ''Step/Successor Consort'') in order to differentiate her from her husband's other wives.

== Titles ==
- During the reign of the Wanli Emperor (r. 1572–1620):
  - Lady Ula-Nara (烏拉那拉氏)
  - Consort (福晉; from unknown date) (Note: The Jurchens had multiple wives with very little distinction between them, all being addressed by this general term. This was also the case for many of Hong Taiji's wives. It was in later compilations of documents that the women were attributed new titles to differentiate them; as noted above, this includes Lady Ula-Nara.)

== Issue ==
- Hooge (豪格), Prince Suwu of the First Rank (肅武親王; 16 April 1609 – 4 May 1648), Hong Taiji's first son
- Loge (洛格; 1611 – November/December 1621), Hong Taiji's second son
- Princess Aohan of the First Rank (敖漢固倫公主; 3 April 1621 – February/March 1654), Hong Taiji's first daughter
  - Married Bandi (班第; d. 1647), of the Aohan Borjigin clan, on 25 May 1633
