= Consort Yuan =

Consort Yuan may refer to:

== Imperial consorts with the surname Yuan ==
- Yuan Qigui (405–440), wife of Liu Yilong (Emperor Wen of Liu Song)
- Empress Yuan (Northern Qi) (died after 580), wife of Gao Yan (Emperor Xiaozhao of Northern Qi)
- Yuan Humo (died 616), wife of Yuwen Jue (Emperor Xiaomin of Northern Zhou)
- Yuan Leshang (born 565), concubine of Yuwen Yun (Emperor Xuan of Northern Zhou)
- Consort Yuan (Ma Yin) (died 933?), concubine of Ma Yin, ruler of Ma Chu

== Imperial consorts with the title Consort Yuan ==
- Consort Yuan (Hong Taiji) (1593–1612), concubine of Hong Taiji, ruler of Later Jin
- Jia Yuanchun, fictional character from Dream of the Red Chamber
