= Xinglongwa culture =

Neolithic culture in Northern China

Coordinates: 42.4625°N 120.2840°E

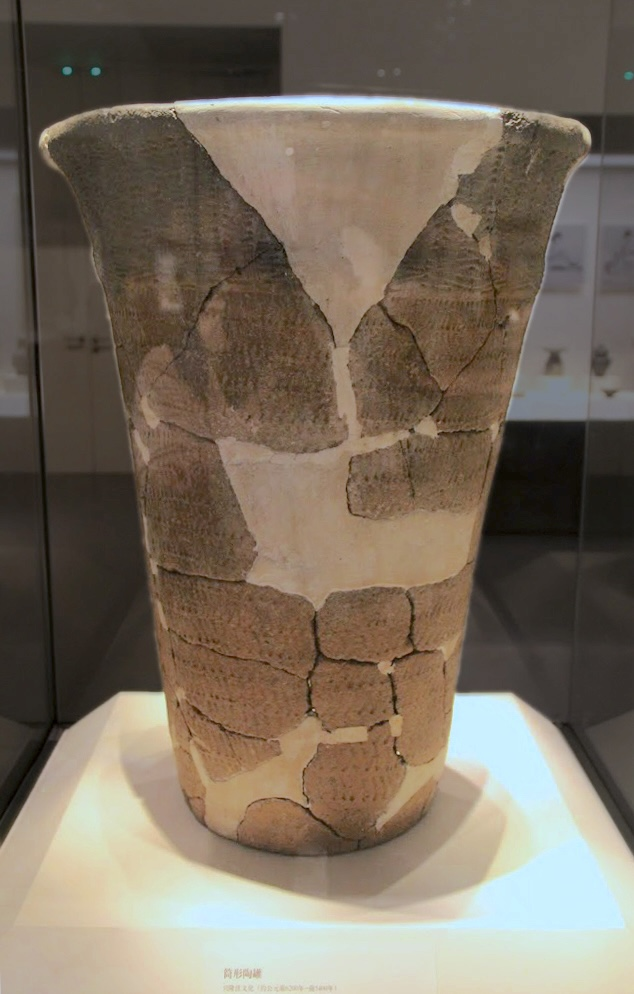
- Period: Neolithic
- Dates: 6200 BC – 5000 BC
- Preceded by: Xiaohexi culture
- Followed by: Zhaobaogou culture

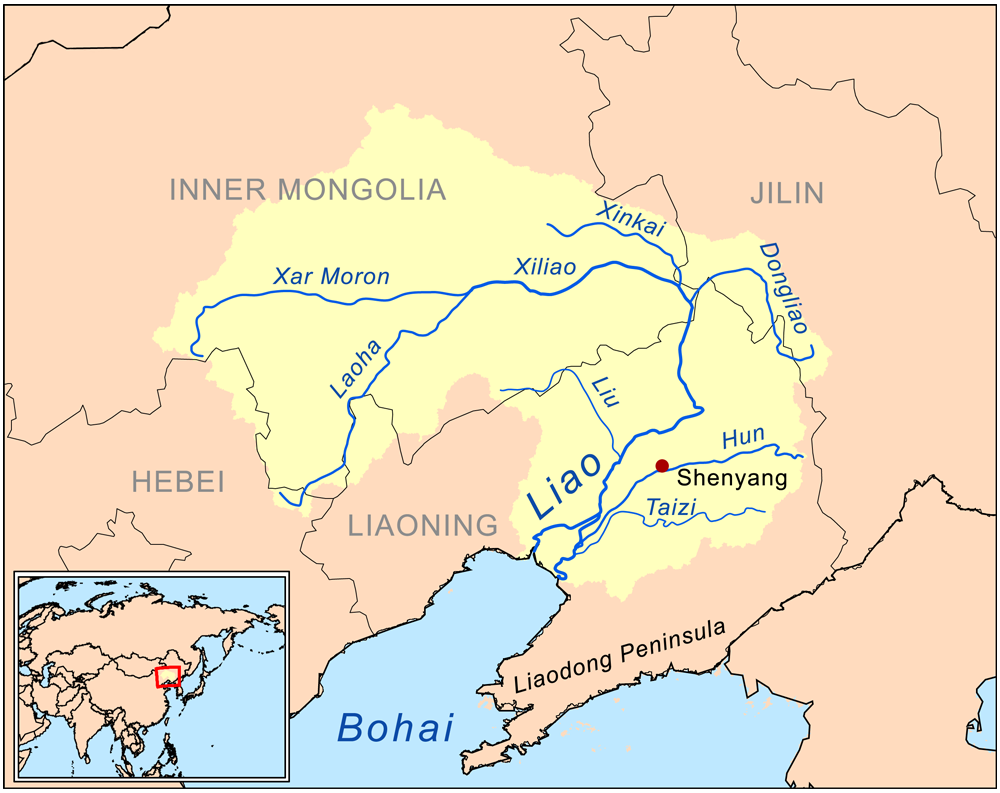

The Xinglongwa culture (興隆洼文化) (6200–5400 BC) was a Neolithic culture in northeastern China, found mainly around the Inner Mongolia-Liaoning border at the Liao River basin. Xinglongwa pottery was primarily cylindrical and baked at low temperatures.

The Xinglongwa culture showed several signs of communal planning. At three Xinglongwa sites, houses were built in rows. Several Xinglongwa sites also featured a large central building. In addition, several Xinglongwa sites were surrounded by ditches.

The type site at Xinglongwa is located on the southwest side of a hill at Aohan Banner, Chifeng, Inner Mongolia; the site is named after a village 1.3 km to the southeast of the site. 120 pit-houses were discovered at Xinglongwa. Each home had a hearth at its center. Xinglongwa also featured a large building in the center of the village. Xinglongwa is the earliest discovered site in China to be surrounded by a ditch. Xinglongwa also featured an unusual burial custom, as some bodies were buried directly under the houses. Jade objects were also discovered. In the most lavish grave, a man was buried with a pair of pigs, as well as jade objects.

According to the study of 34 sets of human remains from Xinglongwa in-house burials, male individuals apparently predominate over female individuals at roughly 2:1 ratio (23 males vs. 11 females). Within the male group, no individuals were identified as being over 55 in age, whereas all of females belong to middle-to-old age group (no one younger than 35 years old). The youngest individuals examined were at age 13 or 14, so it's suspected that children before mature sex-awareness might not have been buried in-house. From examined samples, the average height of males was between 163.8 cm and 168.8 cm, while the average height of females was between 153.4 cm – 159.9 cm. According to some papers, the Xinglongwa are perhaps the distant ancestors of the present-day Northeast Asian peoples that belong to the proposed "Transeurasian" (aka Altaic) language family, but this view has also been criticized.

The recently discovered site at Xinglonggou is the only site of the culture to show evidence of any sort of agriculture, with evidence of millet remains.

Some of the oldest Comb Ceramic artifacts were found in the Xinglongwa culture. A bone flute with five finger holes was also found at a Xinglongwa site.

== See also ==
- Hongshan culture
- List of Neolithic cultures of China
- Prehistoric Beifudi site
- Xinle culture
- Zhaobaogou culture
