= Prince Jingjin =

Prince Jingjin of the First Rank

Chinese name
- Traditional Chinese: 和碩敬謹親王
- Simplified Chinese: 和硕敬谨亲王
Transcriptions
Standard Mandarin
- Hanyu Pinyin: héshuò jìngjǐn qīnwáng
- Wade–Giles: ho-shuo ching-chin ch'in-wang

Manchu name
- Manchu script: ᡥᠣᡧᠣᡳ ᡴᠣᠪᡨᠣᠩᡤᠣ ᠴᡳᠨ ᠸᠠᠩ
- Romanization: hošoi kobtonggo cin wang

Prince Jingjin of the First Rank, or simply Prince Jingjin, was the title of a princely peerage used in China during the Manchu-led Qing dynasty (1644–1912).

The first bearer of the title was Nikan (1610–1652), the third son of Cuyen and a grandson of Nurhaci (the founder of the Qing dynasty). In 1648, Nikan was granted the title "Prince Jingjin of the Second Rank" by the Shunzhi Emperor. One year later, Nikan was promoted to "Prince Jingjin of the First Rank". In 1669, Lanbu (1642–1679), the third holder of the Prince Jingjin title, was demoted by the Kangxi Emperor from a qinwang (first-rank prince) to a feng'en zhenguo gong. The peerage de facto ended in 1680 when the Kangxi Emperor ordered Lanbu to be posthumously removed from the peerage.

== Members of the Prince Jingjin peerage ==
- Nikan (尼堪; 1610–1652), Cuyen's third son, held the title Prince Jingjin of the First Rank from 1649 to 1652, posthumously honoured as Prince Jingjinzhuang of the First Rank (敬謹莊親王)
  - Nisiha (尼思哈; died 1660), Nikan's second son, held the title Prince Jingjin of the First Rank from 1653 to 1660, posthumously honoured as Prince Jingjindao of the First Rank (敬謹悼親王)
  - Lanbu (蘭布; 1642–1679), Nikan's eldest son, held the title Prince Jingjin of the First Rank from 1668 to 1669, demoted to a feng'en zhenguo gong in 1669, posthumously stripped of his title in 1680
    - Laishi (賴士), Lanbu's fourth son, inherited the peerage as a feng'en fuguo gong

== Family tree ==
Nurhaci 努爾哈赤 (1559–1626)
Cuyen 褚英 (1580–1615); Guanglue Beile 廣略貝勒	Huangtaiji 皇太極 (1592–1643)
Nikan 尼堪 (1610–1652); Prince Jingjinzhuang 敬謹莊親王 (1649–1652)	Qing dynasty emperors
Lanbu 蘭布 (1642–1679); Prince Jingjin 敬謹親王 (1668–1669)	Nisiha 尼思哈 (d. 1660); Prince Jingjindao 敬謹悼親王 (1653–1660)
Laishi 賴士; Feng'en Fuguo Gong 奉恩輔國公

== See also ==
- Royal and noble ranks of the Qing dynasty
