= Consort Yuan (Hong Taiji) =

First wife of Hong Taiji (1593–1612)

Consort Yuan 元妃
- Born: 1593; Manchuria
- Died: 1612 (aged 18–19)
- Spouse: Hong Taiji
- Issue Detail: Lobohoi
- House: Niohuru (by birth); Aisin-Gioro (by marriage)
- Father: Eidu

Consort Yuan (1593–1612), of the Niohuru clan, was the first wife of Hong Taiji. She was one year his junior.

== Life ==
=== Family background ===
- Father: Eidu (1562–1622)
- Seventeen brothers
  - Daqi (達啟), Eidu's second son
  - Turgei (圖爾格; d. 1645), Eidu's eighth son
  - Ebilun (d. 1673), Eidu's 16th son; served as one of the Four Regents of the Kangxi Emperor and held the title of duke of the first class (一等公)
- Five younger sisters
  - Lady Niohuru (鈕祜祿氏), Eidu's second daughter; consort of Nikan (尼堪), Prince Jingjinzhuang of the First Rank
  - Lady Niohuru (鈕祜祿氏), Eidu's fourth daughter; consort of Jirgalang, Prince Zhengxian of the First Rank

=== Wanli era ===
Lady Niohuru was born in 1593.

It is not known when she married Hong Taiji. In 1611, she gave birth to his third son, Lobohoi, who would die in 1617.

Lady Niohuru died in 1612. She wasn't posthumously honored as empress after Hong Taiji ascended to the throne.

At some later point, she gained the unofficial title "Consort Yuan" (元妃; lit. ''Premier Consort'') in order to differentiate her from her husband's other wives.

== Titles ==
- During the reign of the Wanli Emperor (r. 1572–1620):
  - Lady Niohuru (鈕祜祿氏)
  - Consort (福晉; from unknown date) (Note: The Jurchens had multiple wives with very little distinction between them, all being addressed by this general term. This was also the case for many of Hong Taiji's wives. It was in later compilations of documents that the women were attributed new titles to differentiate them; as noted above, this includes Lady Niohuru.)

== Issue ==
- Lobohoi (洛博會; 1611–1617), Hong Taiji's third son

== See also ==
- Imperial Chinese harem system § Qing
- Imperial and noble ranks of the Qing dynasty
