= Seokchon-dong =

- Panoramic view of the Ancient Tombs and neighbourhood

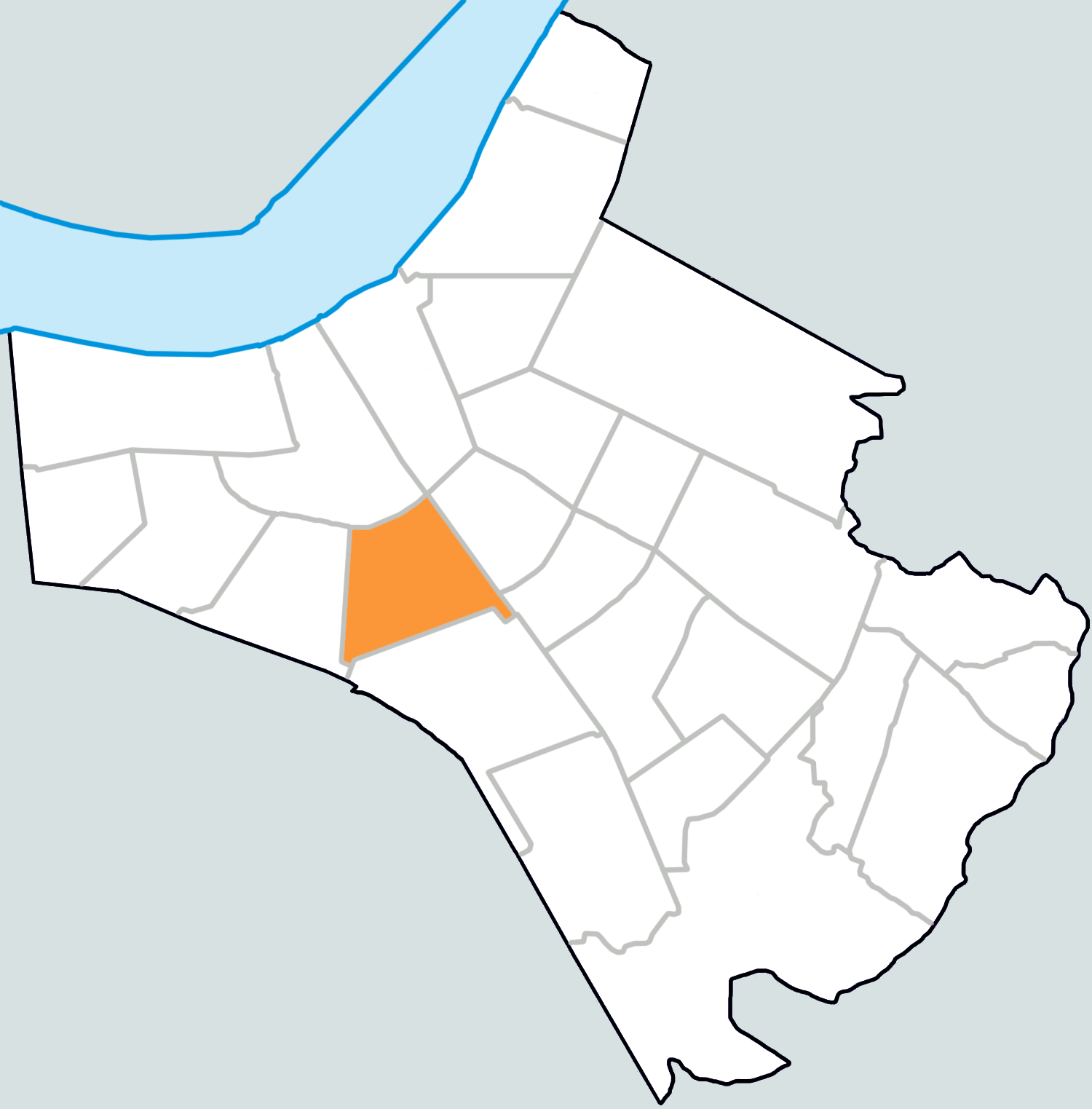
- Country: South Korea

Area
  - Total: 0.95 km^{2} (0.37 sq mi)

Population (2013)
  - Total: 35,315
  - Density: 34,480/km^{2} (89,300/sq mi)

Korean name
- Hangul: 석촌동
- Hanja: 石村洞
- RR: Seokchon-dong
- MR: Sŏkch'on-dong

Seokchon-dong (Korean: 석촌동) is a neighbourhood (dong) of Songpa District, Seoul, South Korea. The current dong name literally means "stone village" in hanja named for the old name, dolmari (돌마리), because the region is to said to have much stone.

== Overview ==
The name of Seokchon-dong is believed to be derived from the presence of large stones in the area. One theory suggests that during the Manchu invasion of Korea in the 17th century, the Qing army used stones in the area to create a fortification, leading to the naming of the location. However, it is more commonly linked to the fact that numerous early Baekje tombs, built with stones, were found in the region. The area’s abundance of stones likely led to the name "Dolmari" (돌마리), which was later adapted into the Chinese character-based name Seokchon (石村).

In 1577, during the Joseon Dynasty, the area was part of Songpa-dong in the Middae-myeon of Gwangju County, Gyeonggi Province. During the Japanese occupation in 1914, when administrative boundaries were reorganized, the area was named Seokchon-ri. In 1963, following the large-scale expansion of Seoul, the region was incorporated into Seongdong District as Seokchon-dong.

In 1975, when Gangnam District was newly established, Seokchon-dong became part of it. The creation of Gangdong District in 1979 further adjusted the administrative boundaries, making Seokchon-dong part of Gangdong. Finally, when Songpa District was separated from Gangdong District in 1988, Seokchon-dong became part of the newly established Songpa District, where it remains today.

== Attractions ==
- Samjeondo Monument
- Seokchon Lake Park

== Education ==
Seoul Seokchon Elementary School is located in Seokchon-dong.

== Transportation ==
Seokchon-dong is served by Seokchon station of.

== See also ==
- Administrative divisions of South Korea
- Baekje
