= Xinglonggou =

Archaeological site in Inner Mongolia, China

- 兴隆沟 (Japanese)
- Interactive map of Xinglonggou
- Periods: Neolithic; Bronze Age
- Cultures: Xinglongwa culture; Hongshan culture; Lower Xiajiadian culture
- Location: Aohan Banner, Inner Mongolia, China
- Region: Liao River basin

Site notes
- Excavation dates: 2001-2003, 2012

Xinglonggou is a Neolithic through Bronze Age archaeological site complex consisting of three separate sites. The sites are located on a loess slope above the left bank of the Mangniu River north of the Qilaotu Mountains in Aohan Banner, Inner Mongolia, China. Xinglonggou is one of the most important sites of the early Neolithic Xinglongwa culture and provides evidence for the development of millet cultivation. The millet assemblage at Xinglonggou consists primarily of broomcorn millet. Xinglonggou is one of the few, early Neolithic sites in China for which systematic flotation has been performed.

== Description ==
Xinglonggou was discovered in 1982. Xinglonggou consists of three separate sites, each corresponding to a different archaeological culture. In chronological order, the oldest site (Xinglonggou 1) dates from around 8000 to 7500 BP and is associated with the Xinglongwa culture; the next site (Xinglonggou 2) dates from around 5500 to 5000 BP and is associated with the Hongshan culture; the youngest site (Xinglonggou 3) dates from around 4000 to 3500 BP and is associated with the Lower Xiajiadian culture.

=== The Xinglongwa site ===
The Xinglongwa site (Xinglonggou 1 or Locality 1) in an early Neolithic settlement, dating to about 5600 BCE. Of the three sites, the Xinglongwa site has the richest material assemblage. The site was excavated from 2001 to 2003. The site covers an area of around 48,000 m^{2} (516,668 sq ft), of which 5,600 m^{2} (60,278 sq ft) has been excavated. The foundations of 145 rectangular semi-subterranean houses were found. The houses were organized into 3 distinct clusters of around 50 houses each, arranged in rows. Unlike most other sites of the Xinglongwa culture, Xinglonggou 1 was not enclosed by a ditch. 37 of the houses have been excavated, where the remains of 28 individuals were found buried within. The remains of pig, red deer, dog, buffalo, badger, raccoon dog, bear, rabbit, and fish were also discovered at the site.

The artefact assemblage at the site includes pottery, lithic tools, and lithic, osseous, shell and jade ornaments. The site has yielded some of the earliest jade artefacts in China. The jade assemblage consists primarily of slit rings, although tubes, chisels and other artefacts were also found. The people of Xinglonggou appeared to favor yellow-green nephrite, a material that was not locally derived.

Residue analysis of starch grain remains from grinding stones and human dental calculus shows that the people of Xinglonggou were primarily processing lily bulbs (Lilium), Chinese yam (Dioscorea polystachya), Trichosanthes kirilowii root, Job's tears, millet, and limited amounts of acorn and various Triticeae grasses. The starch residue cereal remains are dominated by Job's tears (over millet). The Job's tears remains at Xinglonggou 1 is the earliest evidence for Job's tears in Northeast China and the northernmost evidence for Job's tears before 5000 BC.

Systemic flotation at the site yielded over 1,500 grains of broomcorn millet and around 20 grains of foxtail millet. The broomcorn millet is described as being in the early stages of domestication. and was directly dated to around 7,700 BP. Consequently, this is the earliest directly dated millet in the archaeological record. Despite the evidence for limited millet cultivation, the early Neolithic people at Xinglonggou 1 subsisted primarily on hunting and gathering.

=== The Hongshan site ===
The Late Hongshan site (Xinglonggou 2 or Locality 2) is a late Neolithic settlement, dating to about 3300 BCE. The site was excavated in 2003 and 2012. The foundations of four rectangular semi-subterranean houses and 31 storage pits were found in the 2003 excavation. The settlement was enclosed by a ditch. The artefact assemblage at the site includes pottery, lithic and shell artefacts. A terracotta statue dubbed the "Ancestor God of China" (中华祖神陶人) was unearthed during the 2012 excavation. The flora assemblage consisted mostly of nuts and fruits, yielding less millet, proportion-wise, than the early Neolithic Xinglonggou 1 site. The remains of acorn, Corylus heterophylla, Manchurian walnut, Pyrus betulaefolia and Prunus armeniaca were found at the site. Both broomcorn and foxtail millet were found at the Xinglonggou 2.

=== The Lower Xiajiadian site ===
The Lower Xiajiadian site (Xinglonggou 3 or Locality 3) is a Bronze Age settlement, dating to about 2000-1500 BCE. The site was excavated in 2003. The settlement was enclosed by a ditch. The flora assemblage at this site consists primarily of crop remains. Both broomcorn and foxtail millet were found at Xinglonggou 3. The site has yielded the earliest evidence for soybean in Northeast China.

== Millet consumption ==
The people at Xinglonggou consumed millet all the way from the early Neolithic through the Bronze Age, gradually increasing their millet consumption, as a proportion of their diet, over time. While only 15% of the seeds recovered from the early Neolithic Xinglongwa site consisted of millet, an overwhelming 99% of the seeds recovered from the Bronze Age Lower Xiajiadian site consisted of millet. Isotopic analysis reveals that millet constituted a significant part of the people's diet even during the early Neolithic Xinglongwa culture period, and steadily increased over time; analysis shows that this consumption came directly from millet itself, not indirectly from consuming animals that consumed millet. During the Bronze Age, millet cultivation eventually became abundant enough to provide an important source of food for the domesticated pigs at Xinglonggou.
