= Samjeondo Monument =

Monument in Seoul, South Korea

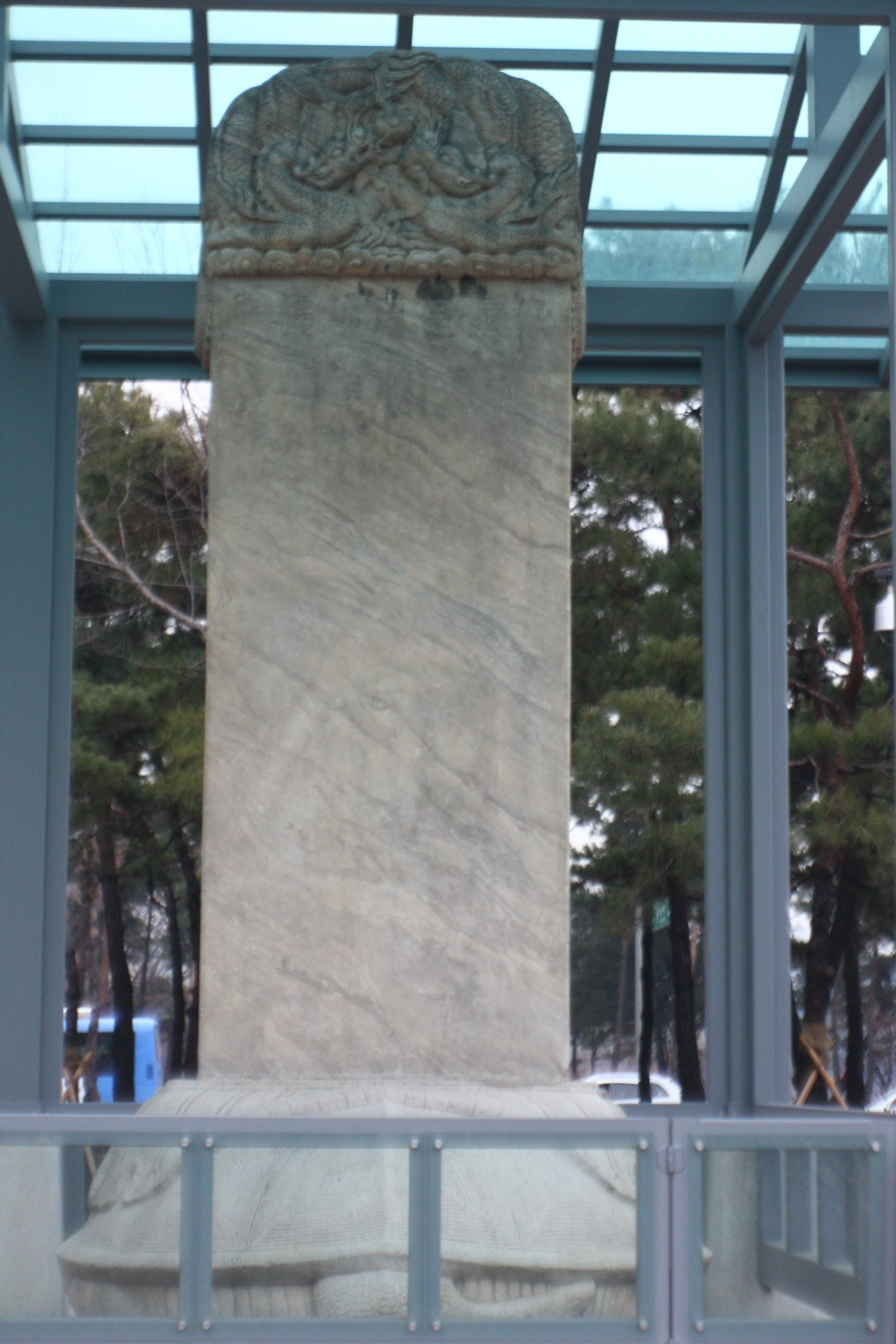
- The monument (2010)
- Interactive map of Samjeondo Monument
- Type: Stele
- Location: Seoul, South Korea
- Coordinates: 37°30′38″N 127°6′6″E

Historic Sites of South Korea
- Official name: Samjeondobi Monument, Seoul
- Designated: 1963-01-21
- Reference no.: 100

Korean name
- Hangul: 삼전도비
- Hanja: 三田渡碑
- RR: Samjeondobi
- MR: Samjŏndobi

The Samjeondo Monument (Korean: 삼전도비; Hanja: 三田渡碑) is a monument marking the submission of the Korean Joseon dynasty to the Manchu-led Qing dynasty in 1636 after the latter's invasion of the former. Its original name was Daecheong Hwangje Gongdeok Bi (大淸皇帝功德碑), which means the stele to the merits and virtues of the Emperor of the Great Qing. Initially erected at Samjeondo, near the Sambatnaru crossing point of the Han River in modern-day Seoul, it was thereafter buried and erected again several times. It is designated as the 101st historic site of South Korea.

== Erection ==
Following the siege of Namhansanseong, King Injo of Joseon was forced to surrender and accept tributary status to Qing China in 1636. The following year, Hong Taiji, founding emperor of the Qing dynasty, ordered King Injo to put up a monument "in honor of the excellent virtues of the Qing Emperor". In 1639 it was erected at Samjeondo, where the ceremony of surrender had been conducted. Inscriptions were written in Manchu and Mongolian on the front side and in Hanmun on the back; they have almost identical contents. The Hanmun version was composed by Yi Gyeongseok (李景奭), and the rest seem to have been translated from it.

Samjeondo, meaning "crossing of the three fields", was located near the Sambatnaru, a major crossing point of the Han River in early Joseon times. The Sambatnaru way was the shortest route to the stronghold of Gwangju and the southern provinces. It was also the one most often used to visit the tomb of King Taejong of Joseon at the foot of Mt. Daemosan.

== Timeline ==
Because of the strong emotional charge attached to it, this monument has been buried and then erected again several times from 1639 till nowadays.

- 1895. The monument was buried down as a result of the Treaty of Shimonoseki that concluded the First Sino-Japanese War.
- 1913. The monument is erected again.
- ???. The monument is buried after 1945. During Syngman Rhee's presidency (1948–1960), orders were given to destroy the stele, but the Ministry of Culture had it buried instead.
- 1957. South Korean Government designates the site as Historic Site No 101 (1957/02/01).
- 1963. The monument becomes visible after the river floods.
- 1983. Monument is placed in a park, 37.503351 N,127.107083 E, i.e. in Seokchon-dong, Songpa-gu, Seoul, South Korea
- 2010. Monument is relocated 37.510407 N, 127.101635 E.

== Names ==
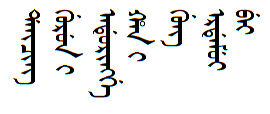
- in Manchu: Daicing gurun-i Enduringge Han-i gung erdemui bei ( )
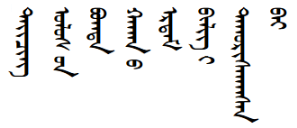
- in Mongolian: Dayičing ulus-un Boγda Qaγan-u erdem bilig-i daγurisγaγsan bei ( )
- in Hanmun: Dàqīng huángdì gōngdé bēi (大淸皇帝功德碑)

which can be translated as "the stele to the merits and virtues of the Emperor of the Great Qing."

== Content ==
=== Description ===
Both the Qing and Joseon dynasties saw the inscription as the litmus test for the latter's attitude toward the Qing emperor, so King Injo ensured that it flattered the Qing dynasty: the inscription narrates how the king of Joseon came to attach himself to the virtue of the Qing emperor from a Joseon point of view. Although one-sided, it provides a concise account of the Qing-Joseon relationship.

The inscription starts with the description of the Qing campaign against Joseon in 1636. The Qing army besieged the Namhan fortress, where King Injo took refuge. He admitted his guilt, accepted the imperial edict and surrendered at Samjeondo. Since Hong Taiji felt compassion for the Joseon king, he mercifully sent the king back to the capital and rapidly withdrew the army without doing harm to the people.

In the next paragraph, the inscription traces the history back to the Battle of Sarhū in 1619. The Joseon army, led by Gang Hong-rip, put on the appearance of supporting the Ming dynasty but surrendered to the Qing dynasty. However, all of the soldiers except the high-ranking ones were released by Nurhaci, and the inscription emphasizes the merciful act. Since Joseon still displayed disobedient behavior, Hong Taiji commenced the Later Jin invasion of Joseon in 1627. He did not overthrow the kingdom but established a Confucian "elder brother-younger brother" relationship. The inscription then goes on to describe the second campaign. When Hong Taiji proclaimed the Qing dynasty in 1636, Joseon did not accept it even though Qing China announced a war. The inscription stressed his benevolent acts during the war.

Next, the inscription explains the background of erection of the monument. It says that the king voluntarily erected the monument at Samjeondo to let the excellent virtue of the Qing emperor be known around the world.

Finally, the inscription summarizes the entire course of events in verse.

== Gallery ==
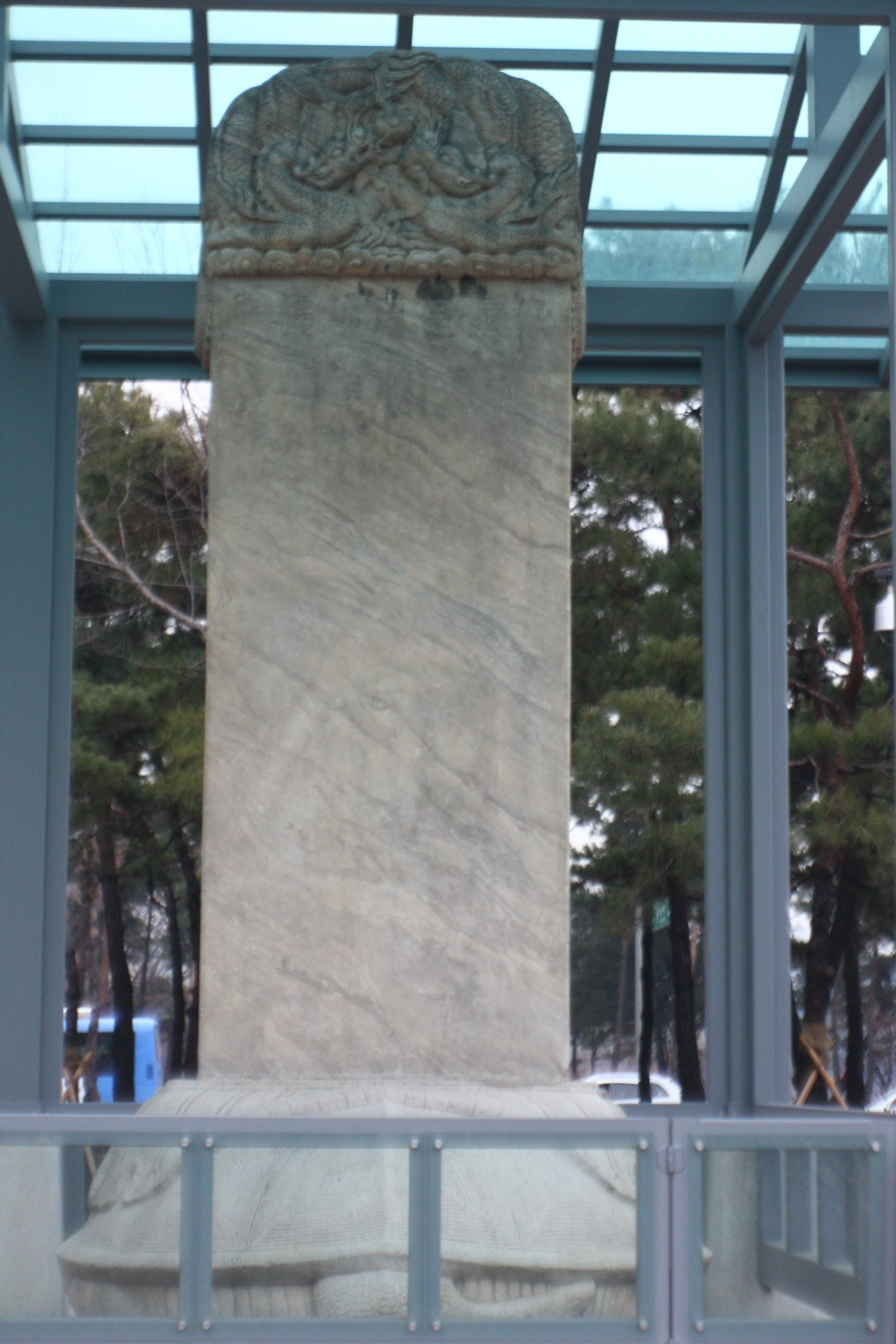
New location, reverse

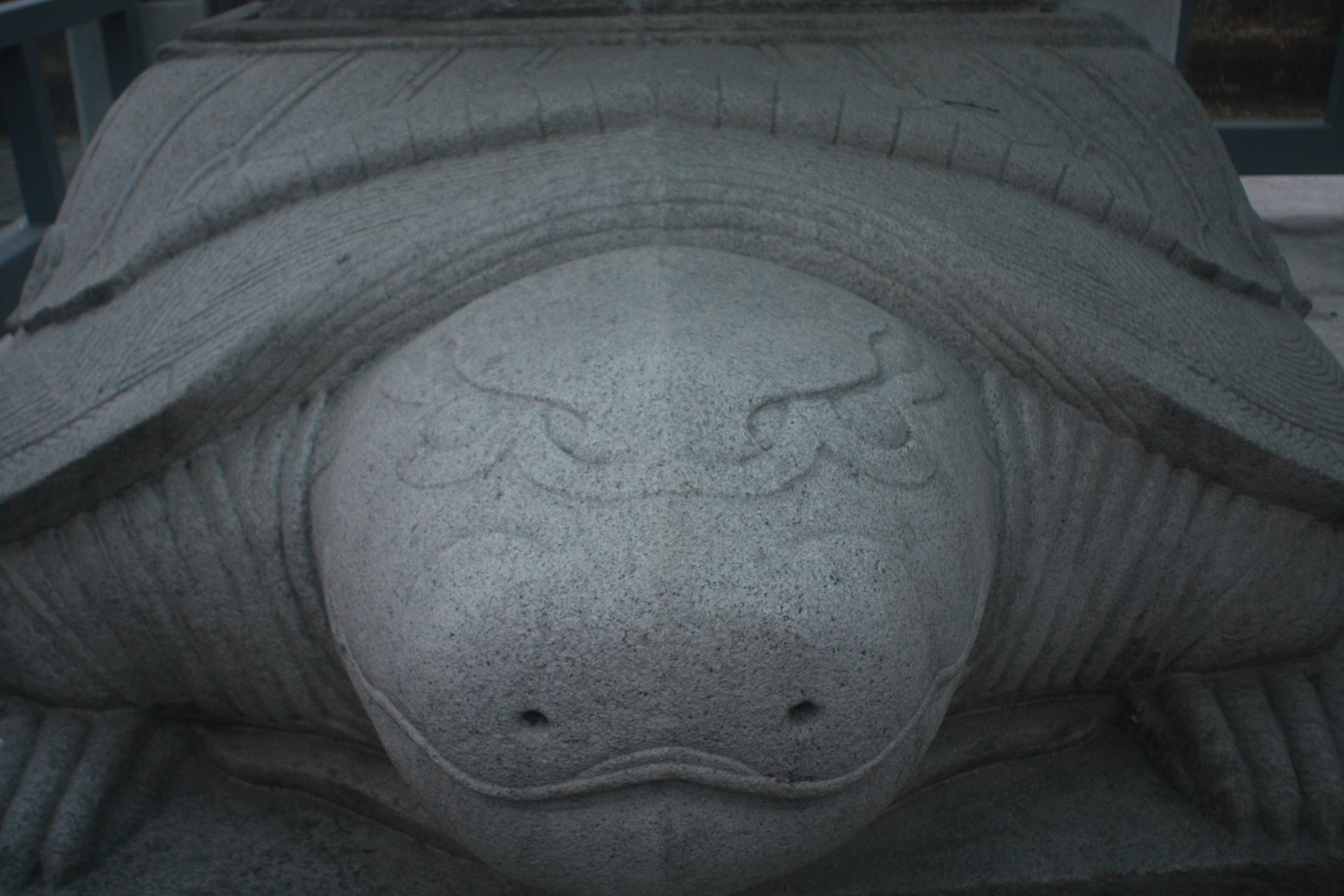
Stone tortoise

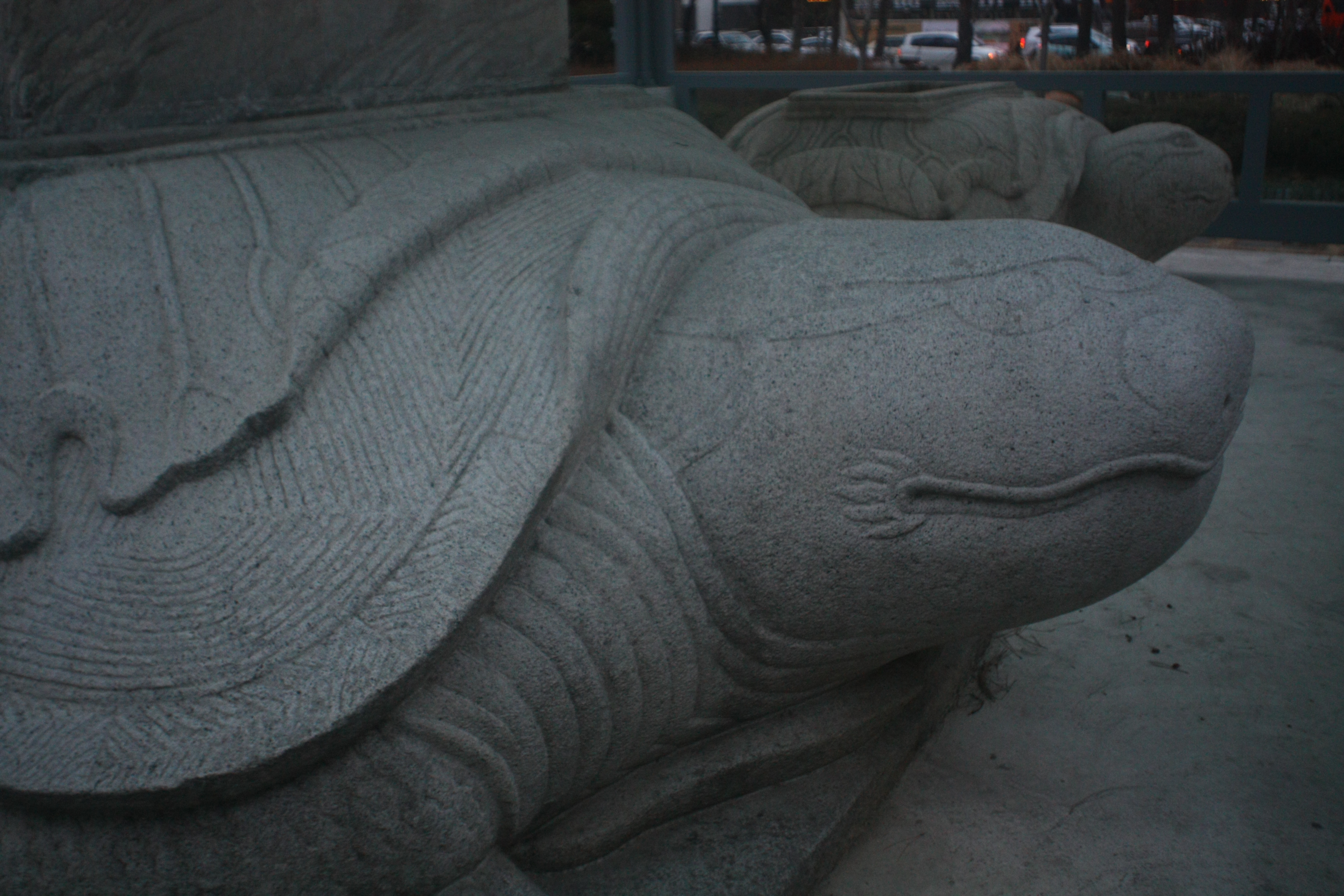
Stone tortoise

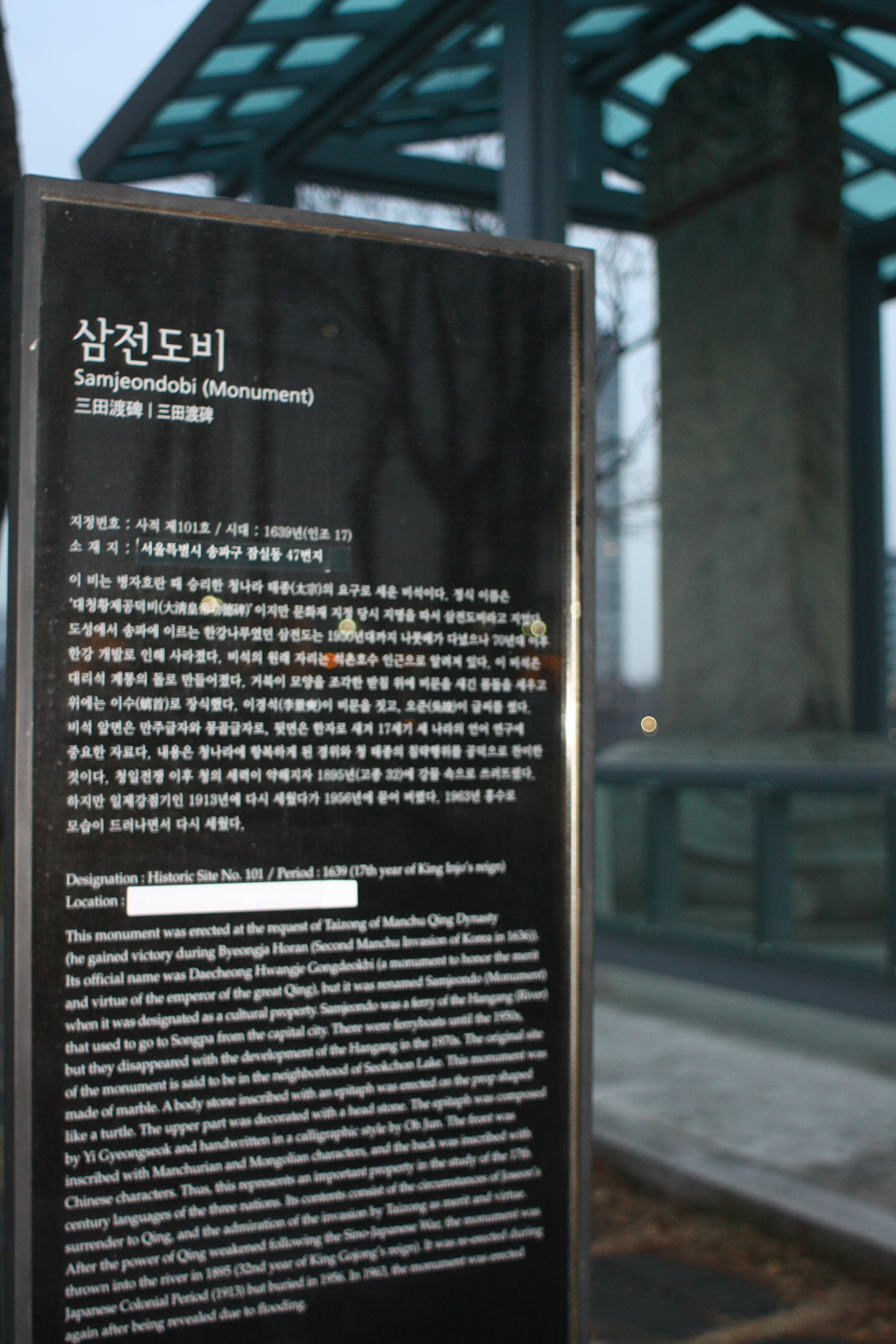
Historic context

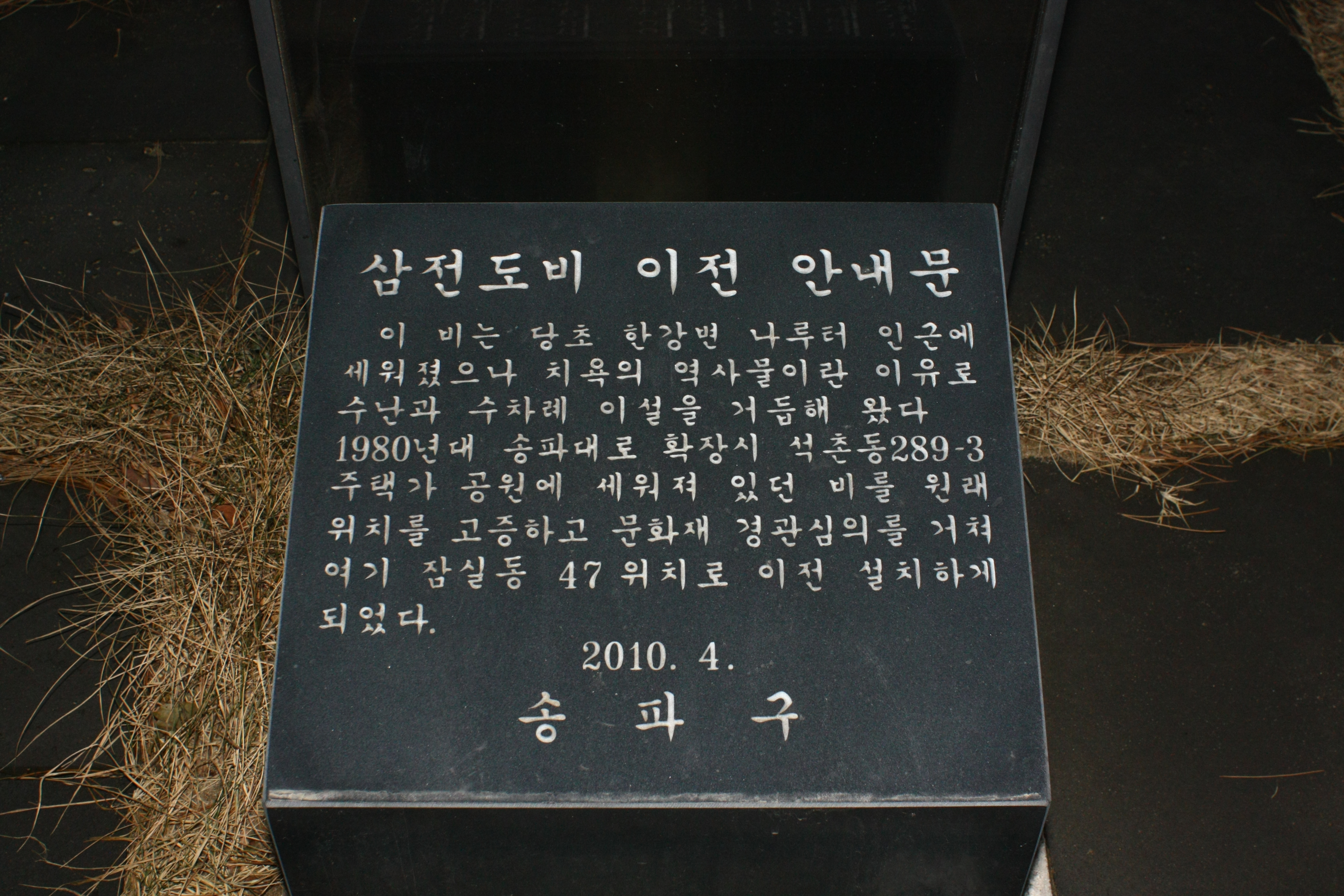
Plaque relating details of the stele's relocation
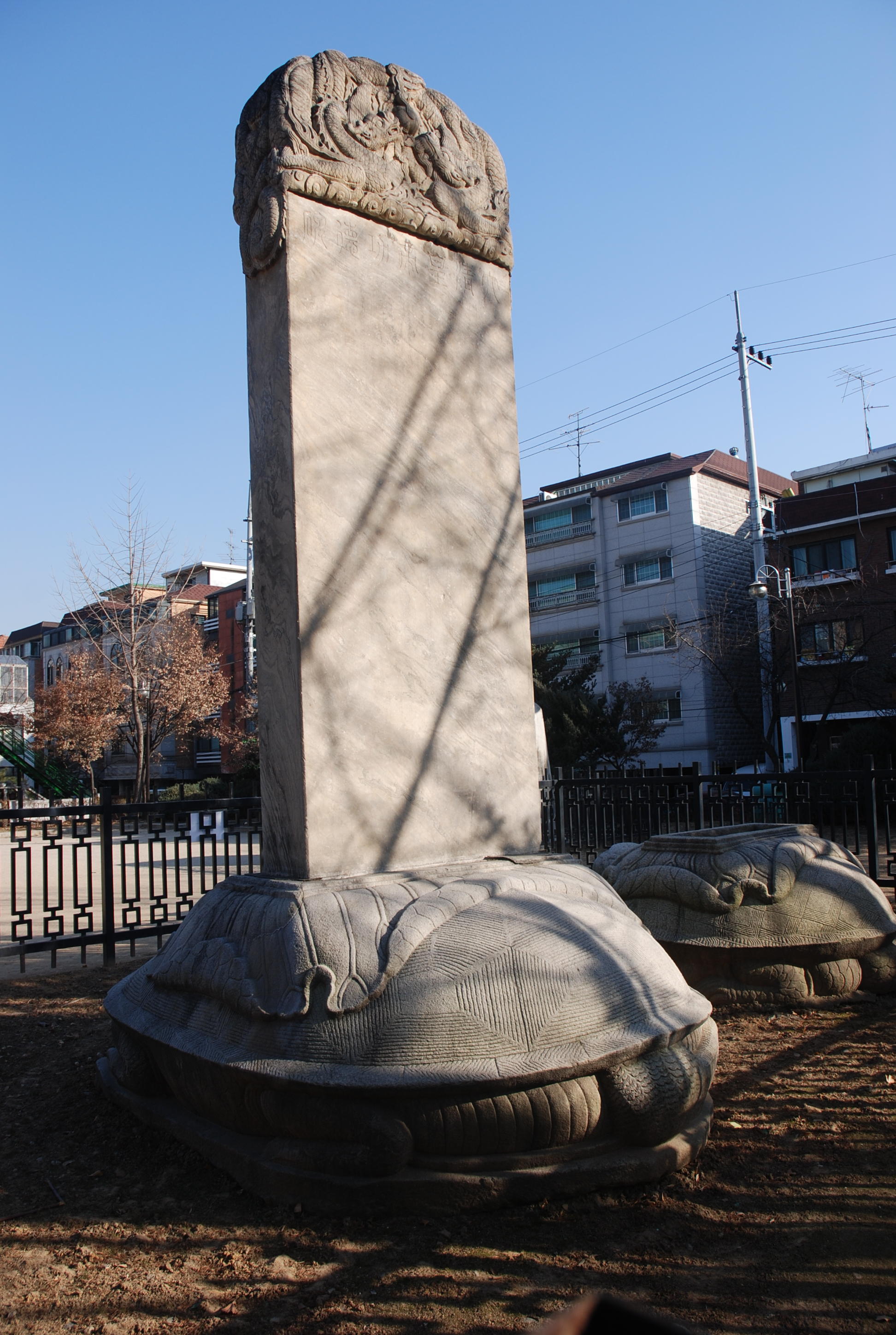
Stele at its previous location

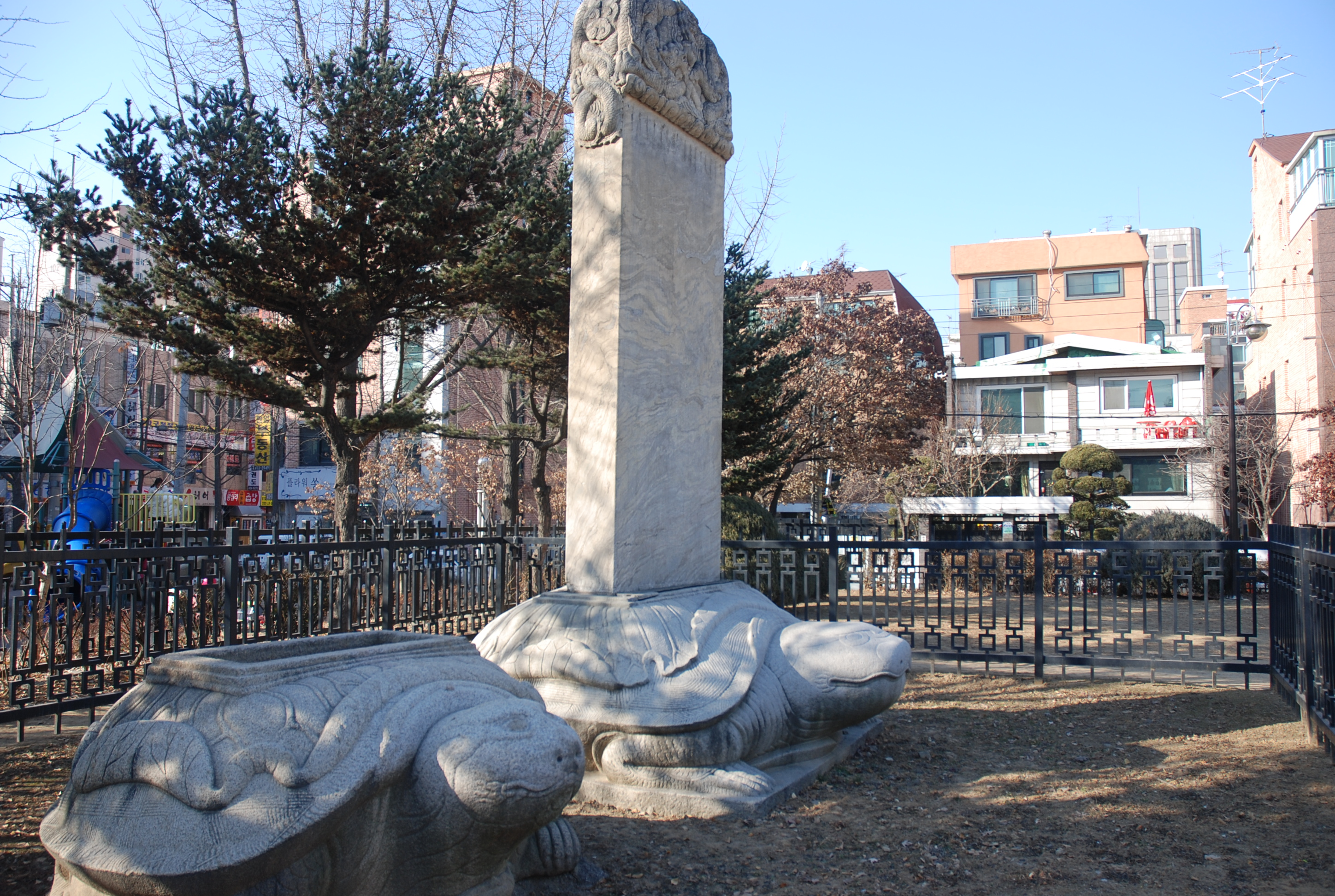
The two tortoises

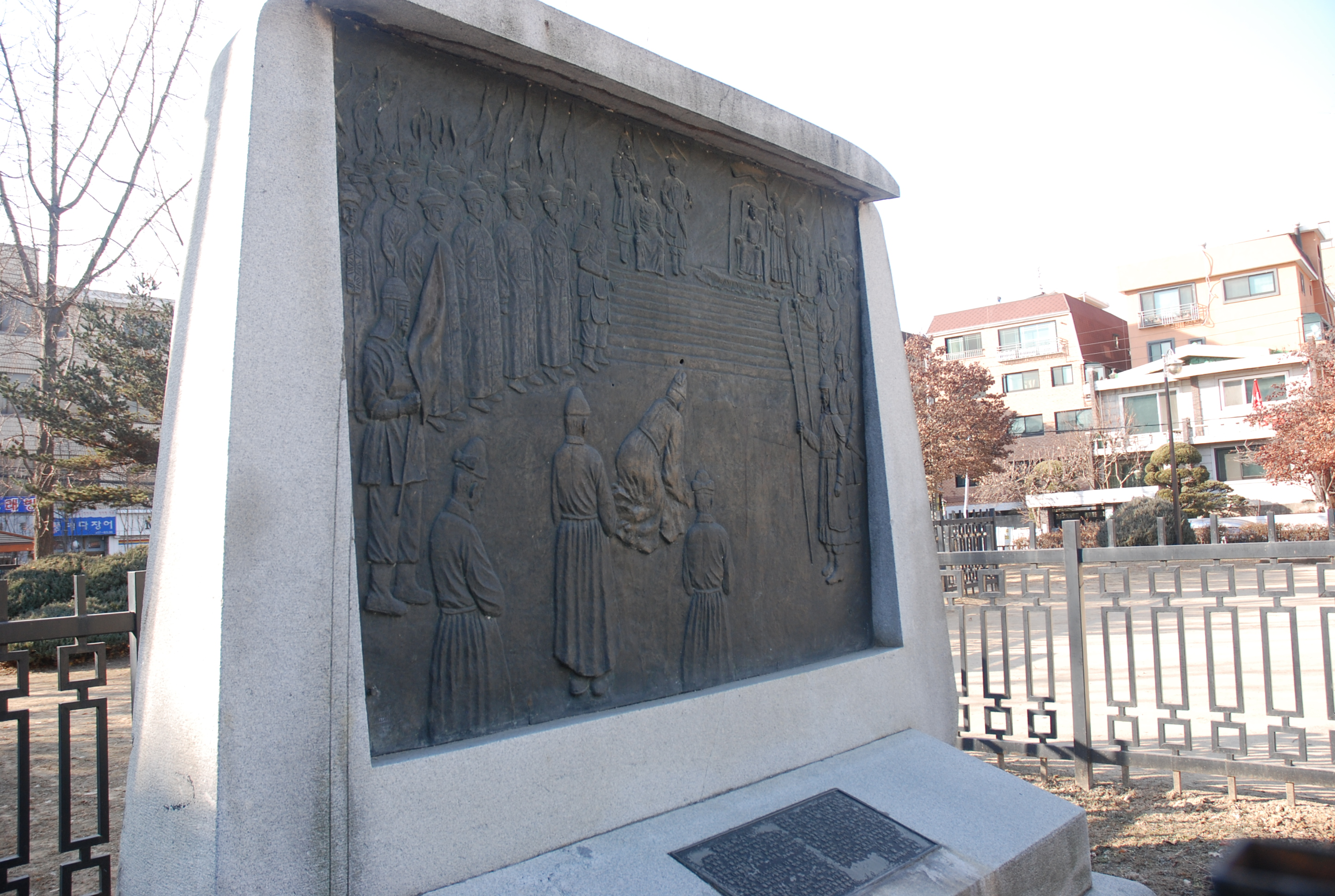
Depiction of kneeling Injo, created in 1983, later demolished.

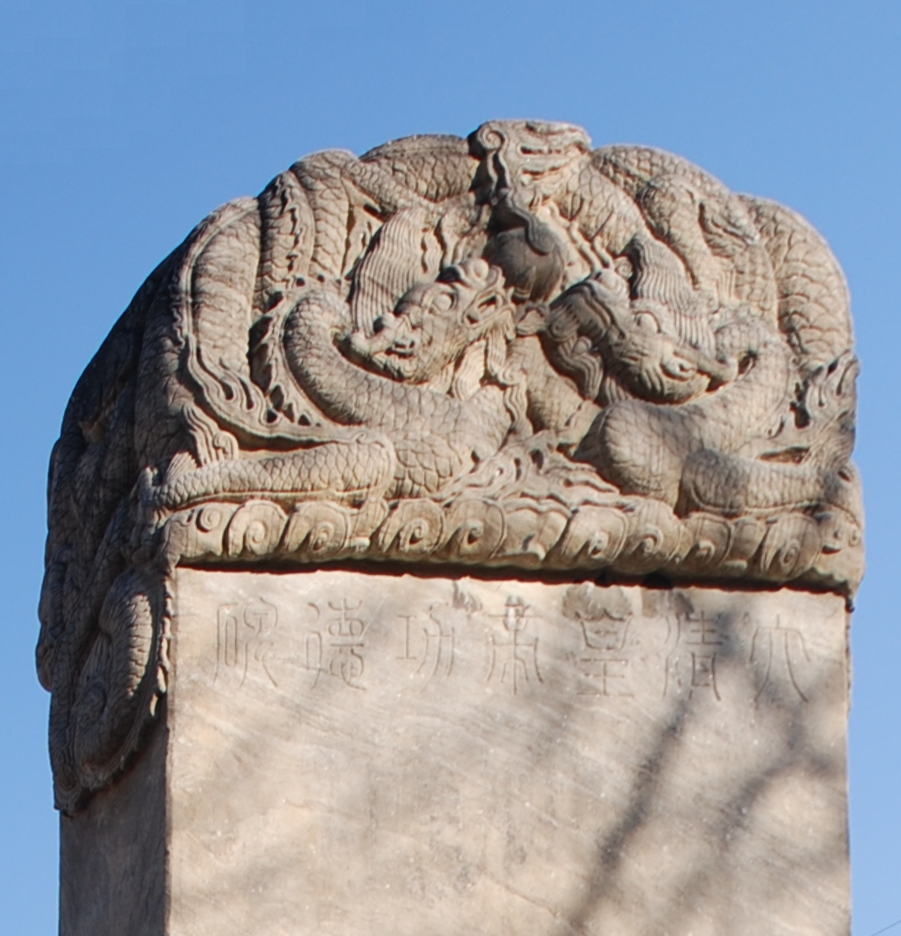
Enlarged view of the stele's reverse top-cap carvings

== See also ==
- History of Korea
- Yeongeunmun Gate
- Independence Gate
- Kowtow
- Tributary system of China
