= Yebušu =

- Duke of the Second Rank
- Born: Aisin Gioro Yebušu (愛新覺羅 葉布舒); 25 October 1627
- Died: 23 September 1690 (aged 62); Beijing
- Consorts: Lady Tubusu; Lady Nara
- Issue: Su'erdeng; First Daughter
Names
- Aisin Gioro Yebušu (愛新覺羅 葉布舒)
- House: Aisin Gioro
- Father: Hong Taiji
- Mother: Mistress Yanzha

Yebušu (Manchu: ᠶᡝᠪᡠᡧᡠ, Chinese: 葉布舒; 25 November 1627 – 23 October 1690), formally known as Duke of the Second Rank (輔國公), was an imperial prince of the Manchu ruled Qing Dynasty and the fourth son of Hong Taiji.

== Life ==
Yebušu was on 25 November 1627 to Hong Taiji and Lady Yanzha. He obtained the title of General of the Firsk Rank.

Yebusu served in a military division of the Plain Yellow Banner, one of three "upper" banner armies under the direct command of the emperor. Despite having served in the imperial army, Yebusu was reputed to share interests of civil official. As the second surviving son of Hong Taiji, Yebushu was considered a potential candidate to the imperial throne. Due to humble origin, Yebushu's candidature was discarded.

During Kangxi era, Yebusu held the title of grace bulwark duke

== Family ==
Parents

- Father: Hong Taiji (皇太極, 28 November 1592 – 21 September 1643), Emperor Taizong of the Qing Dynasty
- Mother: Mistress, of the Yanzha clan (顏扎氏)

Consorts and their respective issue(s):

- Primary Consort, of the Tubusu clan (嫡妻圖布蘇氏)
  - First Daughter ( 28 August 1652 – 20 November 1728)
    - Married Huanghai (黄海) of the Guwalgiya clan in 1667
- Second Primary Consort, of the Nara clan (繼妻納喇氏)
  - Su'erdeng (苏尔登, 5 February 1661 – 2 May 1718), Hereditary General of the First Rank (镇国将军), first son

== See also ==
- Royal and noble ranks of the Qing dynasty
- Ranks of imperial consorts in China#Qing
