= Cuyen =

Manchu prince (1580–1615)

- Prince Guanglue of the Third Rank
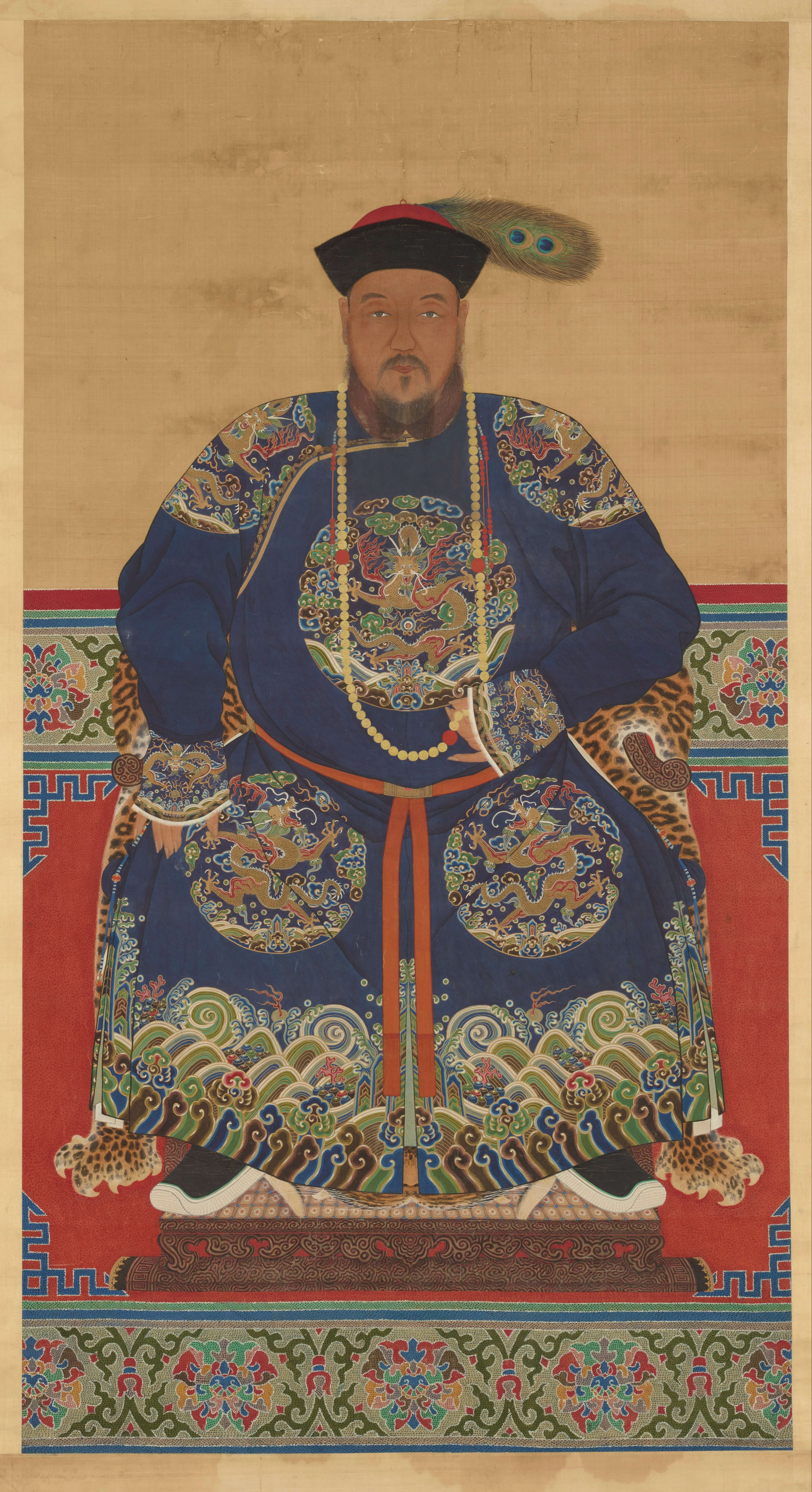
- Born: 1580
- Died: 14 October 1615 (aged 34–35)
- Consort(s): Lady Gorolo; Lady Yehe-Nara
- Issue: Dudu; Guohuan; Nikan, Prince Jingjinzhuang of the First Rank
Names
- Aisin-Gioro Cuyen (愛新覺羅 褚英)
Posthumous name
- Prince Guanglüe of the Third Rank (廣略貝勒)
- House: Aisin Gioro
- Father: Nurhaci
- Mother: Tunggiya Hahana Jacing

Cuyen

Chinese name
- Traditional Chinese: 褚英
- Simplified Chinese: 褚英
Transcriptions
Standard Mandarin
- Hanyu Pinyin: Chǔ Yīng

Manchu script name
- Manchu script: ᠴᡠᠶᡝᠨ

Transcription name
- Transcription: Cuyen

Cuyen (Manchu: ᠴᡠᠶᡝᠨ, Möllendorff: cuyen, Abkai: quyen; 1580 – 14 October 1615) was a Manchu prince and eldest son of the Later Jin ruler Nurhaci, the early patriarch of the Qing dynasty. An accomplished warrior, Cuyen was instrumental in the consolidation of Nurhaci's authority among rival Jurchen clans. He also served as the primary civil administrator for intermittent periods in the regime founded by Nurhaci. However, he eventually lost favour with his father because he tried to cast sorcery spells against other princes. He was placed in solitary confinement and died in captivity a few years later.

== Early life ==
Cuyen was born in 1580, somewhere in the present-day Jilin province in northeastern China, to a prominent family of Jianzhou Jurchens. He is the grandson of Taksi and eldest son of Nurhaci, who at the time was just beginning to rise to prominence in the Jurchen tribe he belonged. Cuyen's mother was Hahana Jacing of the Tunggiya clan, Nurhaci's primary wife, who also gave birth to the prince Daišan.

Cuyen was an able warrior, and spent much of his youth assisting his father in consolidating power in the Manchuria region. His fought in his first major battle against the Anculakit, a rival Jurchen tribe, in 1598, when he was merely 18 years old. When he returned victorious from the field, his father Nurhaci bestowed upon him high honours, granting him the title of Hung Baturu. This later led to some Chinese accounts to refer to Cuyen by the nickname Hong Batu (roughly, "red guy grasping a rabbit").

== Military campaigns ==
Cuyen's next major expedition was sometime around 1608. He and his brother Daišan stormed the town of Fio Hoton (belonging to present-day Sanjiazi Manchu Village, Hunchun, Yanbian) in an attempt to complete the resettlement of another Jurchen tribe who was said to be suffering oppression from the Ula clan, a strategic rival to Nurhaci. However, this put Cuyen at odds with his uncle Šurhaci, a younger brother of Nurhaci, whose daughters had married men from the Ula clan and who had, presumably, wanted to leverage this alliance with Ula to challenge Nurhaci politically. Cuyen again went to war against Ula several years later and took a mountain fortress in the process.

Nurhaci had named Cuyen his heir apparent sometime during Cuyen's youth, and by the early 1600s, Cuyen held significant political authority, especially during periods when his father left the Jurchen capital for military excursions to outlying areas. However, Cuyen's involvement in civil and administrative affairs evoked jealousy and resentment from his brothers and other prominent princes that comprised the elite Jurchen inner circle. Eventually several of his brothers and male cousins petitioned Nurhaci to complain about Cuyen's behavior. Chief among the grievances was the unequal distribution of loot from battle and Cuyen's supposed propensity to grant large holdings for himself. In response, Nurhaci reprimanded Cuyen and implored him to be more magnanimous towards his brothers.

== Downfall ==
In 1612, when Nurhaci left on another military campaign against the Ula, he gave Daišan an especially prominent role at court to "assist" Cuyen while the latter was serving as a de facto chief administrator in the Jurchen capital. In practice, Daišan acted as a check on Cuyen who had at this point lost the confidence of his father. Nurhaci had realized at some point that it was no longer tenable to give Cuyen a special position without alienating other princes who had served with equal levels of distinction and merit. Possibly as a result of Cuyen's own incompetence at balancing the interests of the princes at court, Nurhaci had, in his later years, shown a preference towards governing by consensus of the 'roundtable' of princes instead of giving primacy to one prince.

During the 1612 Ula campaign, it was said that Cuyen had attempted using sorcery to curse the other princes, seemingly in an attempt to enhance his own position. This turned out to be the final straw. Infuriated by the fact that Cuyen did not heed lessons from the past and continued to engage in hostilities against other princes, Nurhaci sentenced Cuyen to solitary confinement. He died in captivity two years later. His official biography stated that he was executed by Nurhaci, though the true circumstances of his death was not clear. An unconfirmed Ming dynasty account apparently believed that Cuyen counseled against incursions into Ming territory in China proper, thereby incurring the wrath of Nurhaci. However, this version is not supported by evidence.

== Title and inheritance ==
Cuyen was the first commander of the Plain White Banner. After he fell from grace it was transferred to Hong Taiji. Cuyen was created a beile before 1598. He was posthumously granted the title Crown Prince Guanglue (廣略太子). It is not clear why Cuyen was granted a great title despite having fallen out with his father. The title was changed to Beile Guanglue (廣略貝勒) during the reign of Nurhaci's son and successor, Huangtaiji. Eventually the title beile was standardized to a "third-grade prince". The title was successively downgraded in later generations. His descendants were a largely unremarkable branch of the Aisin Gioro clan; some became minor officials.

== Family ==
- First wife, of the Gorolo clan (嫡夫人 郭絡羅氏)
  - Dudu, Prince Anping of the Third Rank (安平貝勒 杜度; 6 November 1597 – 3 July 1642), first son
  - Guohuan (國歡; 18 March 1598 – 30 April 1624), second son
- Second wife, of the Yehe Nara clan (繼夫人 葉赫那拉氏)
  - First daughter (19 July 1601 – April/May 1670)
    - Married Fiongdon (費英東; 1562–1620) of the Manchu Gūwalgiya clan in December 1614 or January 1615
  - Second daughter (1603–1623)
  - Third daughter (1606–1673)
  - Nikan, Prince Jingjinzhuang of the First Rank (敬謹莊親王 尼堪; 1 July 1610 – 23 December 1652), third son

== Ancestry ==
Fuman
Giocangga (1526–1583)
Empress Zhi
Taksi (1543–1583)
Empress Yi
Nurhaci (1559–1626)
Cancha
Agu
Empress Xuan (d. 1569)
Cuyen (1580–1615)
Tamu
Hahana Jacing (1560–1592)

== See also ==
- Royal and noble ranks of the Qing dynasty
- Ranks of imperial consorts in China#Qing
