= Hong Taiji =

Founding emperor of the Qing dynasty

Hong Taiji 皇太極
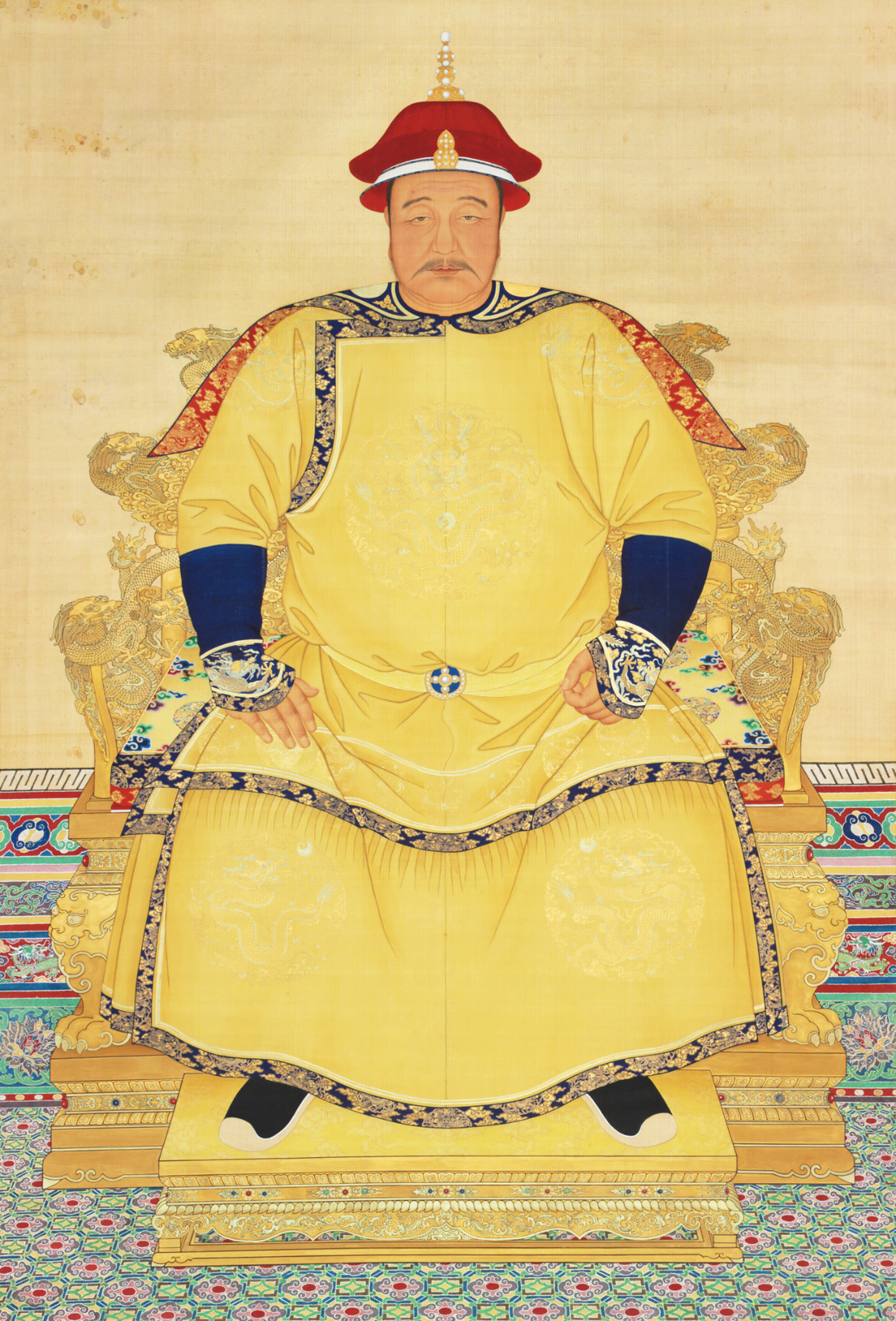
- 17th century state portrait, by anonymous court painter, currently in the collection of the Hong Kong Palace Museum

Emperor of the Qing dynasty
- Reign: 14 May 1636 – 21 September 1643 (7 years, 130 days)
- Successor: Shunzhi Emperor

Khan of the Jin dynasty
- Reign: 20 October 1626 – 14 May 1636 (9 years, 207 days)
- Predecessor: Nurhaci
- Born: 28 November 1592; Fu Ala, Manchuria (in present-day Xinbin Manchu Autonomous County)
- Died: 21 September 1643 (aged 50); Mukden Palace (in present-day Shenyang)
- Burial: Zhao Mausoleum
- Consorts: Consort Yuan (died 1612): Consort Ji; Empress Xiaoduanwen (m. 1614) Empress Xiaozhuangwen (m. 1625)
- Issue Detail: Hooge, Prince Suwu of the First Rank; Princess Wenzhuang of the First Rank; Yebušu, Duke of the Second Rank; Šose, Prince Chengzeyu of the First Rank; Shunzhi Emperor
Era dates
- Tiancong (天聰): 16 February 1627 – 6 February 1636 Manchu: Abkai sure (ᠠᠪᡴᠠᡳ ᠰᡠᠷᡝ) Mongolian: Тэнгэрийн сэцэн (ᠲᠩᠷᠢ ᠶᠢᠨ ᠰᠡᠴᠡᠨ); Chongde (崇德): 7 February 1636 – 7 February 1644 Manchu: Wesihun erdemungge (ᠸᡝᠰᠢᡥᡠᠨ ᠡᠷᡩᡝᠮᡠᠩᡬᡝ) Mongolian: Дээд эрдэмт (ᠳᠡᠭᠡᠳᠦ ᠡᠷᠳᠡᠮᠳᠡᠢ)
Regnal name
- Emperor Kuanwen Rensheng (寬溫仁聖皇帝); Bogda Chechen Khan (博格達徹辰汗)
Posthumous name
- Emperor Yingtian Xingguo Hongde Zhangwu Kuanwen Rensheng Ruixiao Jingmin Zhaoding Longdao Xiangong Wen (應天興國弘德彰武寬溫仁聖睿孝敬敏昭定隆道顯功文皇帝); Manchu: Abka de Acabume, Gurun be Mukdembuhe, Doro be Amban Obuha, Horon be Algimbuha, Gosin Onco, Hūwaliyasun Enduringge, Hiyoošungga Erdemungge, Ten be Badarambuha, Gung be Iletulehe, Genggiyen Šu Hūwangdi (ᠠᠪᡴᠠ ᡩᡝ ᠠᠴᠠᠪᡠᠮᡝ᠈ ᡤᡠᡵᡠᠨ ᠪᡝ ᠮᡠᡴᡩᡝᠮᠪᡠᡥᡝ᠈ ᡩᠣᡵᠣ ᠪᡝ ᠠᠮᠪᠠᠨ ᠣᠪᡠᡥᠠ᠈ ᡥᠣᡵᠣᠨ ᠪᡝ ᠠᠯᡤᡳᠮᠪᡠᡥᠠ᠈ ᡤᠣᠰᡳᠨ ᠣᠨᠴᠣ᠈ ᡥᡡᠸᠠᠯᡳᠶᠠᠰᡠᠨ ᡝᠨᡩᡠᡵᡳᠩᡤᡝ᠈ ᡥᡳᠶᠣᠣᡧᡠᠩᡤᠠ ᡝᡵᡩᡝᠮᡠᠩᡤᡝ᠈ ᡨᠨ ᠪᡝ ᠪᠠᡩᠠᡵᠠᠮᠪᡠᡥᠠ᠈ ᡤᡠᠩ ᠪᡝ ᡳᠯᡝᡨᡠᠯᡝᡥᡝ᠈ ᡤᡝᠩᡤᡳᠶᡝᠨ ᡧᡠ ᡥᡡᠸᠠᠩᡩᡳ)
Temple name
- Taizong (太宗); Manchu: Taidzung (ᡨᠠᡳᡯ᠊ᡠ᠊ᠩ)
- House: Aisin Gioro
- Dynasty: Later Jin (1626–1636); Qing (1636–1643)
- Father: Nurhaci
- Mother: Empress Xiaocigao

Hong Taiji (28 November 1592 – 21 September 1643), sometimes rendered as Huang Taiji and occasionally referred to as Abahai in Western literature, also known by his temple name Emperor Taizong of Qing, was the second khan of the Later Jin dynasty and the founding emperor of the Qing dynasty. He was responsible for consolidating the empire that his father Nurhaci had founded and laid the groundwork for the conquest of the Ming dynasty, although he died before this was accomplished. He conquered Inner Mongolia and the remainder of Manchuria and invaded Korea, which became a Qing tributary state. He was also responsible for changing the name of the Jurchens to "Manchu" in 1635, and changing the name of his dynasty from "Great Jin" to "Great Qing" in 1636.

== Names and titles ==
It is unclear whether "Hong Taiji" was a title or a personal name. Written in Manchu, hong taiji was borrowed from the Mongolian title khong tayiji. That Mongolian term was itself derived from the Chinese huang taizi (皇太子; "crown prince"), but in Mongolian it meant, among other things, something similar to "respected son". Alternatively, historian Pamela Crossley argues that "Hung Taiji" was a title "of Mongolian inspiration" derived from hung, a word that appeared in other Mongolian titles at the time. Early seventeenth-century Chinese and Korean sources rendered his name as "Hong Taiji" (洪台極). The modern Chinese rendering "Huang Taiji" (皇太極), which uses the character huang (皇; "imperial"), misleadingly implies that Hong Taiji once held the title of heir apparent, even though his father Nurhaci never designated a successor.

"Hong Taiji" was very rarely used in Manchu sources, because they observed a taboo on the personal names of emperors. In redacted documents, Hong Taiji was simply called the "Fourth Beile" or "fourth prince" (duici beile), indicating that he was the fourth ranked among the eight beile Nurhaci had designated from among his sons. Although he was the eighth prince, he was the fourth beile amongst the Four Senior Beiles (Daišan, Amin, Manggūltai, Hong Taiji) who rotated leading administrative power on behalf of Nurhaci after the original crown prince Cuyen was deposed. At this time and after the deposition of Cuyen, Hong Taiji was awarded control of Cuyen's Plain White Banner troops by Nurhaci for his military contributions to the empire. Dudu, son of Cuyen, would control the newly split Bordered White Banner and later transferred to Ajige (Nurhaci's 12th son). After Lady Abahai was rumored to be forced to be buried with Nurhaci after his death, Hong Taiji promised to personally raise her three surviving sons Ajige, Dorgon and Dodo, and in essence also controlled both White Banners for maintaining good brotherly relations. However, an archival document rediscovered in 1996 and recounting events from 1621 calls him "Hong Taiji" in a discussion concerning the possible naming of Nurhaci's heir apparent, a title that the document refers to as taise. Tatiana Pang and Giovanni Stary, two specialists of early Manchu history, consider this document as "further evidence" that Hong Taiji was his real name, "not being at all connected with the Chinese title huang taizi". Historian Mark Elliott views this as persuasive evidence that Hong Taiji was not a title, but a personal name.

Hong Taiji was the second khan of the Later Jin and then emperor of the Qing dynasty, after he changed its name. His title as great khan was Bogd Sécén Khaan (Manchu: Gosin Onco Hūwaliyasun Enduringge Han), and he was referred to as Bogda Khan by his Mongol subjects. His reign names, which were used in his lifetime to record dates, were Tiancong (天聰; "heavenly wisdom"; Manchu: Abka-i sure) from 1627 to 1636, and Chongde (崇德; "lofty virtue"; Manchu: Wesihun erdemungge, Mongolian: Degedü Erdemtü) from 1636 to 1643.

Hong Taiji's temple name, by which he was worshipped at the Imperial Ancestral Temple, was Taizong (太宗), the name that was conventionally given to the second emperor of a dynasty. His posthumous name, which was chosen to reflect his style of rule, was Emperor Wen (文皇帝; Manchu: šu hūwangdi), which means "the culturing emperor" or "the emperor of letters". (Note: Hong Taiji's complete posthumous name was much longer: 1643: Yingtian xingguo hongde zhangwu kuanwen rensheng ruixiao Wen Emperor (應天興國弘德彰武寬溫仁聖睿孝文皇帝); 1662: Yingtian xingguo hongde zhangwu kuanwen rensheng ruixiao longdao xiangong Wen Emperor (應天興國弘德彰武寬溫仁聖睿孝隆道顯功文皇帝); Longdao xiangong 隆道顯功 ("prosperous way and manifestation of might") was added; 1723: Yingtian xingguo hongde zhangwu kuanwen rensheng ruixiao jingmin longdao xiangong Wen Emperor (應天興國弘德彰武寬溫仁聖睿孝敬敏隆道顯功文皇帝); Jingmin 敬敏 ("reverent and diligent") was added; 1735: Yingtian xingguo hongde zhangwu kuanwen rensheng ruixiao jingmin zhaoding longdao xiangong Wen Emperor (應天興國弘德彰武寬溫仁聖睿孝敬敏昭定隆道顯功文皇帝); Zhaoding 昭定 ("illustrious stability") was added)

In 17th and 18th century sources, Hong Taiji was referred to as "Zungh-te", or as "Zungteus", a Latinization of Chongde by Martino Martini in his De Bello Tartarico Historia. Western scholars used to refer to Hong Taiji as "Abahai", but this appellation is now considered mistaken. Hong Taiji was never mentioned under this name in Manchu and Chinese sources; it was a mistake first made by Russian clergyman Vladimir Gorsky and later repeated by sinologists starting in the early twentieth century. Giovanni Stary states that this name may have originated by confusing "Abkai" with Abkai sure, which was Hong Taiji's era name in the Manchu language. Though "Abahai" is indeed "unattested in Manchu sources", it might also have derived from the Mongol word Abaġai, an honorary name given to the younger sons of hereditary monarchs. According to another view, Hong Taiji was mistakenly referred to as Abahai as a result of a confusion with the name of Lady Abahai, one of Nurhaci's consorts.

== Consolidation of power ==
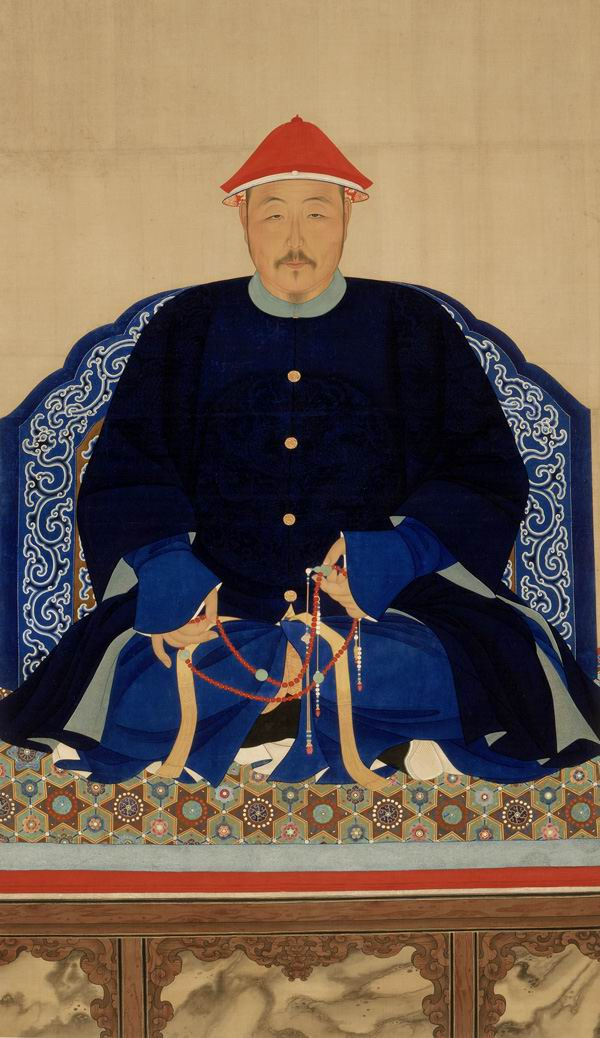
Hong Taiji in regular clothing

Hong Taiji was the eighth son of Nurhaci, whom he succeeded as the second ruler of the Later Jin dynasty in 1626. He might have had Mongolian ancestry and half blood from the Yehe Nara clan as the son of Empress Xiaocigao, and he might have been genetically related to the Mongolic Daur people as a member of the Aisin Gioro clan.

Although it has always been regarded as gossip, he was said to have been involved in the suicide of Dorgon's mother, Lady Abahai, in order to block the succession of his younger brother. This is speculated because at the time of Nurhaci's death, there were Four Senior Beiles with Hong Taiji holding the lowest rank, but also being the most fit one to rule. It was between Hong Taiji and Daisan mainly, although Manggūltai tried to thrown his name into the mix, Dorgon quickly shut him up by claiming other Jurchens and Mongolians would not support a Khan who supposedly killed his own mother. Whether it was a Lady Abahai suicide or forced death to be buried with Nurhaci after his death, the other beiles and princes would not support the rumored succession and claims of Dorgon to the throne as he and his two brothers were just teenagers without military merit. Hong Taiji was said to be fluent in Manchu, Mongolian, and the Han languages and writings. As the 4th Senior Beile with a history of military merit that matches Daisan, Hong Taiji was nice and respectful to other beiles, princes, and their children and family. Being a better strategist and politician than Daisan, Hong Taiji gained the final endorsement from Daisan and the other beiles and princes who supported Daisan turned their consolidated support towards Hong Taiji and urged him to take the throne. Hong Taiji swore he will continue love and respect all his brothers and cousins and their family. Hong Taiji also would take the throne as long as Daisan, Amin, and Manggūltai continue to share administrative power with him until he earns the power to rule alone (although this wasn't specified, it was somewhat implied). During his coronation, Hong Taiji even bowed to his 2nd brother, eldest cousin, and 5th brother as a show of honor and respect that he is elected honorably so nobody will question his succession.

Originally, at the end of Nurhaci's reign, Hong Taiji controlled the two White Banners, but after Lady Abahai's death, he switched his two banners with Dorgon and Dodo's two Yellow banners that was directed passed down from Nurhaci. In the end, Hong Taiji had control over the two highest and strongest banners — the Plain Yellow Banner and Bordered Yellow Banners — and the most influence as an elected Khan and second ruler of the Later Jin Dynasty. From there, he slowly got rid of his other three senior beiles and competitors' powers. Later, he would also receive the Plain Blue Banner from his fifth brother Manggūltai, which was the third strongest banner at that time for the treasonous crime of withdrawing his sword and threatening Hong Taiji. Those three banners would officially become the Upper Three Banners during the early years of the Qing dynasty. Unofficially known was the Three Upper Banners or Imperial Banners directly controlled by the Khan and later Emperor of the Qing Dynasty. The Plain Blue Banner was eventually switched with Dorgon's Plain White Banner when he was Royal Imperial Uncle Prince Regent for Fulin.

== Ethnic policies ==
During his reign, Hong Taiji started recruitment of Han Chinese officials. After a 1623 revolt, Nurhaci came to mistrust his Nikan (Manchu: ᠨᡳᡴᠠᠨ, "Han people") followers so Hong Taiji began their assimilation into the country and government.

A mass marriage of Han Chinese officers and officials to Manchu women numbering 1,000 couples was arranged by Prince Yoto and Hong Taiji in 1632 to promote harmony between the two ethnic groups.

The Mongol Yamen (ᠮᠣᠩᡤᠣ
ᠵᡠᡵᡤᠠᠨ 蒙古衙門, monggo jurgan) was established in 1636 for indirect government of Inner Mongolia after the Mongols were conquered by Hong Taiji. It was renamed to Lifanyuan in 1638. Initially, the ministerial affairs were settled, while vice-ministers were set up as vice-ministers.

== Expansion ==
He continued the expansion of the Later Jin dynasty in Manchuria, pushing deeper into the Mongolian Plateau and raiding the Joseon dynasty and the Ming dynasty. His personal military abilities were widely praised and he effectively developed the military-civil administration known as the Eight Banners or Banner system. This system was well-suited to accept the different peoples, primarily Han and Mongols, who joined the Later Jin state either following negotiated agreements or military defeat.

Although Hong Taiji patronized Tibetan Buddhism in public, in private he disdained the Buddhist belief of the Mongols and thought it was destructive of Mongol identity. He is quoted to have said that, "The Mongolian princes are abandoning the Mongolian language; their names are all in imitation of the lamas." The Manchus themselves such as Hong Taiji did not personally believe in Tibetan Buddhism and few wanted to convert. Hong Taiji described some Tibetan Buddhist lamas as "incorrigibles" and "liars", but still patronized Buddhism in order to harness the Tibetans' and Mongols' belief in the religion.

Hong Taiji started his conquest by subduing the potent Ming ally in Korea. February 1627 his forces crossed the Yalu River which had frozen. In 1628, he attempted to invade the Ming dynasty, but was defeated by Yuan Chonghuan and his use of artillery. During the next five years, Hong Taiji spent resources in training his artillery to offset the strength of the Ming artillery.

Hong Taiji upgraded the weapons of the Empire. He realized the advantage of the Red Cannons and later also bought the Red Cannons into the army. Though the Ming dynasty still had more cannons, Hong Taiji now possessed the cannons of equal might and Asia's strongest cavalry. Also during this time, he sent several probing raids into northern China which were defeated. First attack went through the Jehol Pass, then in 1632 and 1634 he sent raids into Shanxi.

In 1636, Hong Taiji invaded Joseon Korea, as the latter did not accept that Hong Taiji had become emperor and refused to assist in operations against the Ming. With the Joseon dynasty surrendered in 1637, Hong Taiji succeeded in making them cut off relations with the Ming dynasty and force them to submit as tributary state of the Qing dynasty. Also during this period, Hong Taiji took over Inner Mongolia, which protected northern border of China, in three major wars, each of them victorious. From 1636 until 1644, he sent 4 major expeditions into the Amur region. In 1640 he completed the conquest of the Evenks, when he defeated and captured their leader Bombogor. By 1644, the entire region was under his control.

Huang Taji's plan at first was to make a deal with the Ming dynasty. If the Ming was willing to give support and money that would be beneficial to the Qing's economy, the Qing in exchange would not only be willing to not attack the borders, but also admit itself as a country one level lower than the Ming dynasty; however, since Ming court officials were reminded of the deal that preceded the Song dynasty's wars with the Jin Empire, the Ming refused the exchange. Huang Taiji rejected the comparison, saying that, "Neither is your Ming ruler a descendant of the Song nor are we heir to the Jin. That was another time." Hong Taiji had not wanted to conquer the Ming. The Ming's refusal ultimately led him to take the offensive. The people who first encouraged him to invade the Ming dynasty were his ethnic Han advisors Fan Wencheng, Ma Guozhu, and Ning Wanwo. Hong Taiji recognized that the Manchus needed Han defectors in order to assist in the conquest of the Ming, and thus explained to other Manchus why he also needed to be lenient to recent defectors like Ming general Hong Chengchou, who surrendered to the Qing in 1642.

== Government ==
When Hong Taiji came into power, the military was composed of entirely Mongol and Manchu companies. By 1636, Hong Taiji created the first of many Chinese companies. Before the conquest of the Ming dynasty, the number of companies organized by him and his successor was 278 Manchus, 120 Mongols, and 165 Han. By the time of Hong Taiji's death there were more ethnic Han than Manchus and he had realized the need for there to be control exerted whilst getting approval from the Han majority. Not only did he incorporate the Han into the military, but also into the government. The Council of Deliberative Officials was formed as the highest level of policy-making and was composed entirely of Manchu. However, Hong Taiji adopted from the Ming such institutions as the Six Ministries, the Censorate and others. Each of these lower ministries was headed by a Manchu prince, but had four presidents: two were Manchu, one was Mongol, and one was Han. This basic framework remained, even though the details fluctuated over time, for some time.

== Renaming the dynasty ==
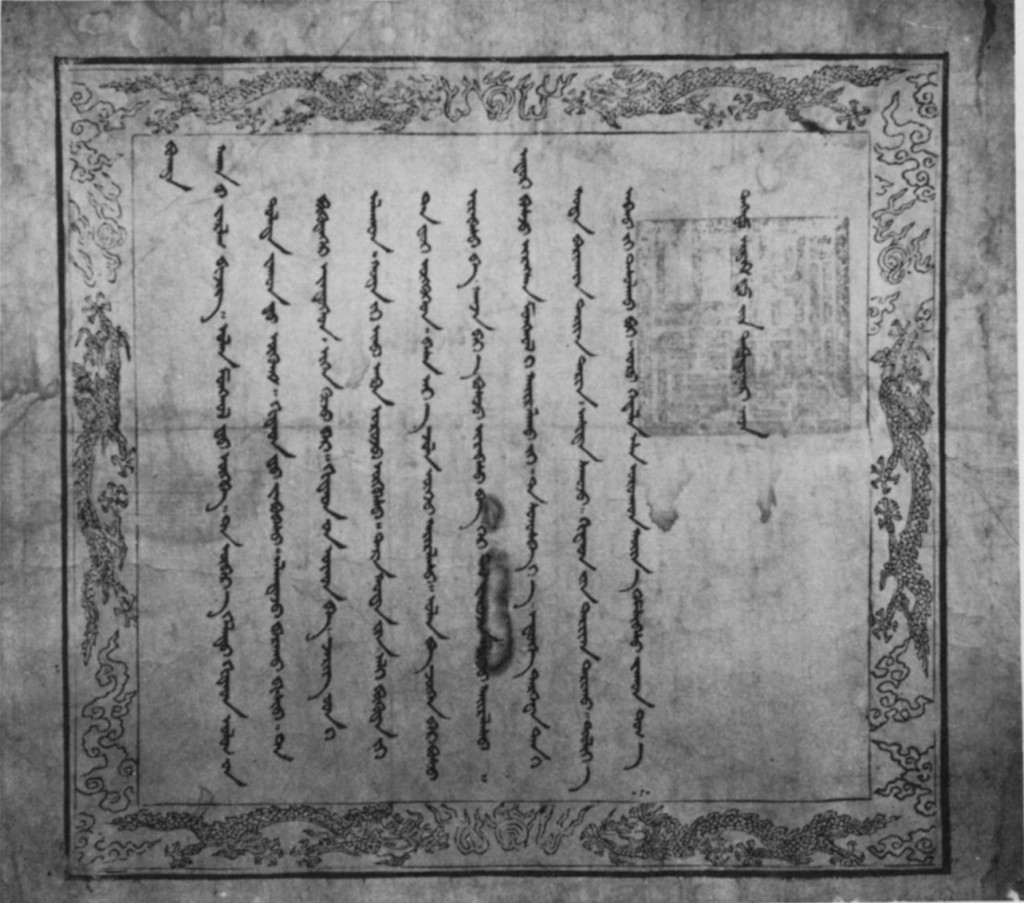
Edict by Hong Taiji in the Mongolian language, issued to many Mongol lords who were in the military of the Ming dynasty

In 1635, Hong Taiji changed the name of his people from Jurchen (Manchu: jušen) to Manchu, or manju in the Manchu language. The original meaning of Manju is not known and so the reasons for its adoption remain opaque. There are many theories as to the reason for the choice of name but two of the most commonly cited are its sounding similar to the Manchu word for "brave" and a possible connection with the Bodhisattva Manjusri, the Bodhisattva of Wisdom, of whom Nurhaci claimed to be an incarnation.

The dynastic name Later Jin was a direct reference to the Jin dynasty founded by the Jurchen people, who ruled northern China from 1115 to 1234. As such, the name was likely to be viewed as closely tied to the Jurchens and would perhaps evoke hostility from ethnic Han who viewed the Song dynasty, rival state to the Jin, as the legitimate rulers of China at that time. Hong Taiji's ambition was to conquer China proper and overthrow the Ming dynasty, and to do that required not only a powerful military force but also an effective bureaucratic administration. For this, he used the obvious model, that of the Ming government, and recruited Ming officials to his cause. If the name of Later Jin would prove an impediment to his goal among the Han people, then it was not too much to change it. At the same time, Hong Taiji conquered territory north of Shanhai pass and defeated Ligdan Khan in Inner Mongolia. He captured one of the Yuan dynasty's imperial jade seals (Chinese: 制誥之寶) and a golden Buddha called "Mahakala". In April 1636, the Mongolian nobility of Inner Mongolia, Manchu nobility and Han bureaucrats held a Kurultai in Shenyang where they voted to support Hong Taiji to be the emperor of what would later become the Qing empire. Russian archive contains translations of the 1636 year Hong Taiji decree with the provision that after the fall of the Qing dynasty Mongols will return to their previous laws, i.e. independence. Whatever his precise motivation behind doing so might've been, Hong Taiji proclaimed the establishment of the Qing dynasty and also changed his era name to Chóngdé in 1636. The reasons for the choice of Qing as the name of this new dynasty are likewise unclear, although it has been speculated that Jin and Qing are pronounced similarly in Manchu. However, according to the wuxing theory, traditional ideas held that fire, which was associated with the character for Ming, would be overcome by water, which is the element associated with the character for Qing, and that this might have influenced the choice. Another possible reason may be that Hong Taiji changed the name of the dynasty from (Later) Jin to Qing in order to avoid destructive fraternal struggles and skirmishes between brothers and half brothers for the throne, as according to Taoist philosophy, the dynastic name Jin carries the meaning of metal and fire in its constituents, thereby supposedly "igniting the tempers" of the brothers of the Manchurian dynasty into open conflict and war. Hong Taiji therefore adopted the new name of Qing (清), which includes the Chinese character for water on its left hand side. The name, which means "clear and transparent", with its water symbol, was hoped to put out the feud between the brothers.

Hong Taiji claimed that the progenitor of his clan, the Aisin Gioro, was the legendary figure Bukūri Yongšon (布庫里雍順), who was supposedly conceived from a virgin birth. According to legend, three heavenly maidens, namely Enggulen (恩古倫), Jenggulen (正古倫) and Fekulen (佛庫倫), were bathing at a lake called Bulhūri Omo near the Changbai Mountains. A magpie dropped a piece of red fruit near Fekulen, who ate it. She then became pregnant with Bukūri Yongšon. However, another older version of the story by the Hurha (Hurka) tribe member Muksike recorded in 1635 contradicts Hong Taiji's version, claiming that it was in Heilongjiang province close to the Amur river where Bulhuri lake was supposedly located and that it was there that the "heavenly maidens" took their bath. This was recorded in the Jiu Manzhou Dang and his much shorter and simpler in addition to being older. This is thus believed to be the original version and Hong Taiji changed it to Changbai. It shows that the Aisin Gioro clan originated in the Amur area and the Heje (Hezhen) and other Amur valley Jurchen tribes had an oral version of the same tale. It also fits with Jurchen history as some ancestors of the Manchus came down from the north into the Amur valley before the 14th-15th centuries and only later moved further south.

== The banners status ==
Before Hong Taiji was emperor, he controlled the two White banners. Upon Nurhaci's death, Hong Taiji immediately switched his two White Banners with Nurhaci's two Yellow Banners, which should have been passed on to Dorgon and his two brothers Ajige and Dodo. As emperor, he was the holder of three banners out of eight. He controlled the Upper Three Banners or the Elite banners which at the time were the Plain/Bordered Yellow Banners and Plain Blue Banner, which was consolidated from Manggūltai. Later the Plain Blue Banner was switched by Dorgon to the Plain White Banner as the third Elite Banner. At the end of his reign, Hong Taiji gave the two Yellow Banners to his eldest son Hooge. Daisan, who was the second son of Nurhaci, and his son Yoto controlled the two Red Banners. Dorgon and his two brothers controlled the two White Banners and Šurhaci's son Jirgalang controlled the remaining Bordered Blue Banner.

== Death and succession ==
Hong Taiji died on 21 September 1643 just as the Qing was preparing to attack Shanhai Pass, the last Ming fortification guarding access to the north China plains. (Note: Most sources give the date of Hong Taiji's death on September 21 (Chongde 崇德 8.8.9); however others give the date as September 9.) Because he died without having named an heir, the Qing state now faced a succession crisis. The Deliberative Council of Princes and Ministers debated on whether to grant the throne to Hong Taiji's half-brother Dorgon – a proven military leader – or to Hong Taiji's eldest son Hooge. As a compromise, Hong Taiji's five-year-old ninth son Fulin was chosen, while Dorgon – alongside Nurhaci's nephew Jirgalang – was given the title of "prince regent". Fulin was officially crowned emperor of the Qing dynasty on 8 October 1643 and it was decided that he would reign under the era name "Shunzhi." A few months later, Qing armies led by Dorgon seized Beijing, and the young Shunzhi Emperor became the first Qing emperor to rule from that new capital. That the Qing state succeeded not only in conquering China but also in establishing a capable administration was due in large measure to the foresight and policies of Hong Taiji. His body was buried in Zhaoling, located in northern Shenyang.

== Legacy ==
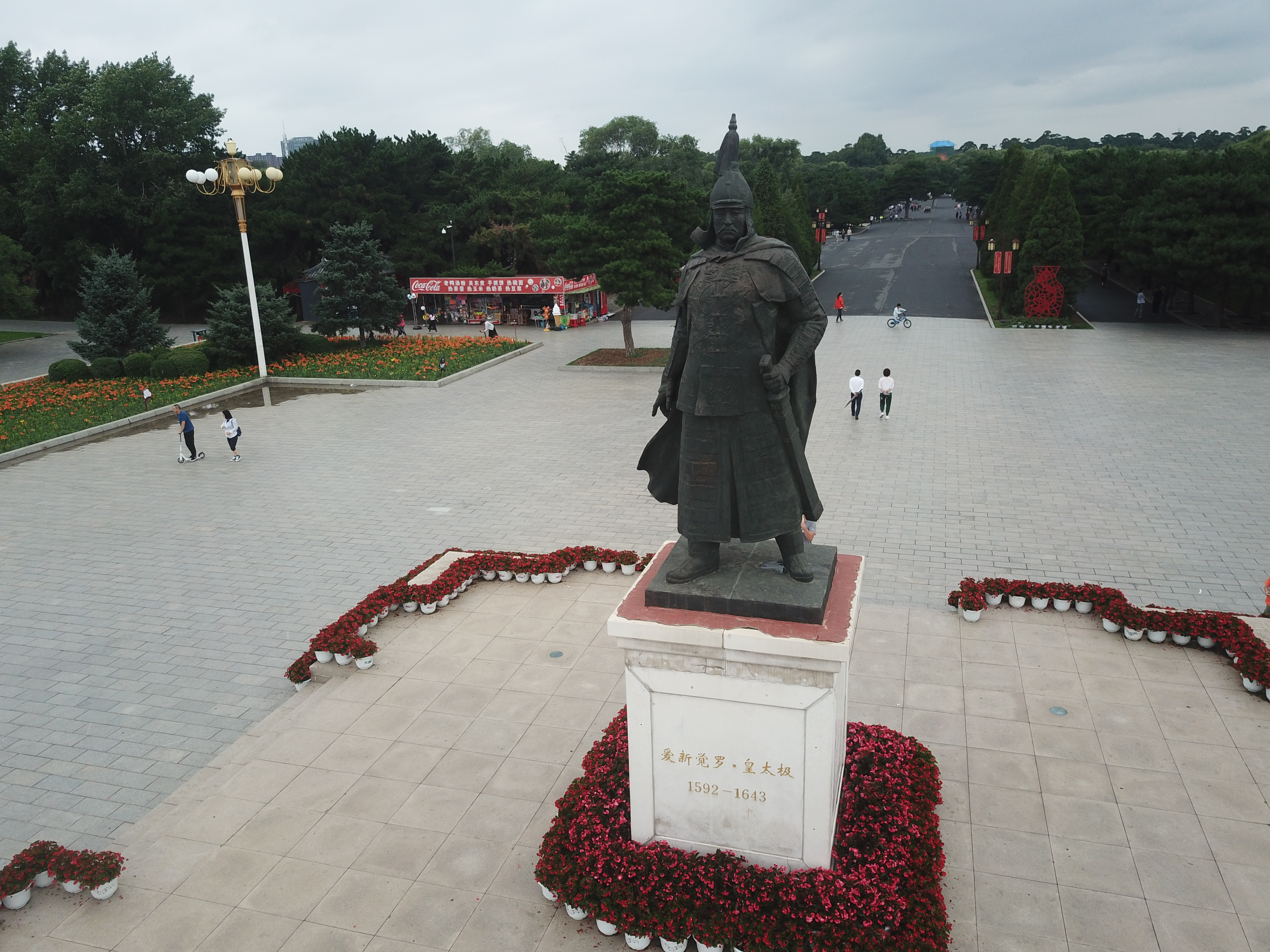
Statue of Hong Taiji in Beiling Park

As the emperor, he is commonly recognized as having abilities similar to the best emperors such as Yongle, Emperor Taizong of Tang due to his effective rule, use of talent, and warring skills. According to writer Jin Yong, Hong Taiji had the broad and wise views of Qin Shi Huang, Emperor Gaozu of Han, Emperor Guangwu of Han, Emperor Wen of Sui, Emperor Taizong of Tang, Emperor Taizu of Song, Kublai Khan, the Hongwu Emperor, and the Yongle Emperor. His political abilities were paralleled only by Genghis Khan, Emperor Taizong of Tang, and Emperor Guangwu of Han. In this sense, Hong Taiji is considered by some historians as the true first emperor for the Qing dynasty. Some historians suspect Hong Taiji was overall underrated and overlooked as a great emperor because he was a Manchu.

== Family ==
- Consort Yuan (元妃), of the Niohuru clan (鈕祜祿氏; 1593–1612)
  - Lobohoi (洛博會; 1611–1617), third son
- Consort Ji (繼妃), of the Ula Nara clan (烏拉那拉氏)
  - Hooge (豪格), Prince Suwu of the First Rank (肅武親王; 16 April 1609 – 4 May 1648), first son
  - Loge (洛格; 1611 – November/December 1621), second son
  - Princess Aohan of the First Rank (敖漢固倫公主; 3 April 1621 – February/March 1654), first daughter
    - Married Bandi (班第; d. 1647), of the Aohan Borjigin clan, on 25 May 1633
- Empress Xiaoduanwen (孝端文皇后), of the Khorchin Borjigin clan (博爾濟吉特氏; 31 May 1599 – 28 May 1649), personal name Jerjer (哲哲)
  - Makata (馬喀塔), Princess Wenzhuang of the First Rank (固倫溫莊公主; 10 September 1625 – April/May 1663), second daughter
    - Married Ejei (額哲; d. 1641), of the Chahar Borjigin clan, on 16 February 1636
    - Married Abunai (阿布奈; 1635–1675), of the Chahar Borjigin clan, in 1645, and had issue (two sons)
  - Dazhe (达哲), Princess Jingduan of the First Rank (固倫靖端公主; 2 August 1628 – June/July 1686), third daughter
    - Married Kitad (奇塔特; d. 1653), of the Khorchin Borjigin clan, in 1639
  - Princess Yong'an Duanzhen of the First Rank (固倫永安端貞公主; 7 October 1634 – February/March 1692), eighth daughter
    - Married Bayasihulang (巴雅斯護朗), of the Khorchin Borjigin clan, in 1645
- Empress Xiaozhuangwen (孝莊文皇后), of the Khorchin Borjigin clan (博爾濟吉特氏; 28 March 1613 – 27 January 1688), personal name Bumbutai (布木布泰)
  - Yatu (雅圖), Princess Yongmu of the First Rank (固倫雍穆公主; 31 January 1629 – February/March 1678), fourth daughter
    - Married Birtakhar (弼爾塔哈爾; d. 1667), of the Khorchin Borjigin clan, in 1641
  - Atu (阿圖), Princess Shuhui of the First Rank (固倫淑慧公主; 2 March 1632 – 28 February 1700), fifth daughter
    - Married Suo'erha (索爾哈), of the Khalkha Borjigin clan, in 1643
    - Married Sabdan (色布騰; d. 1667), of the Barin Borjigin clan, in 1648
  - Princess Shuzhe Duanxian of the First Rank (固倫淑哲端獻公主; 16 December 1633 – February/March 1648), seventh daughter
    - Married Lamasi (喇瑪思), of the Jarud Borjigin clan, in 1645
  - Fulin (福臨), the Shunzhi Emperor (順治帝; 15 March 1638 – 5 February 1661), ninth son
- Primary Consort Minhui (敏惠元妃), of the Khorchin Borjigin clan (博爾濟吉特氏; 1609 – 22 October 1641), personal name Harjol (海蘭珠)
  - Eighth son (27 August 1637 – 13 March 1638)
- Noble Consort Yijing (懿靖貴妃), of the Abaga Borjigin clan (博爾濟吉特氏; d. 1674), personal name Namjung (娜木鐘)
  - Princess Duanshun of the First Rank (固倫端順公主; 30 April 1636 – July/August 1650), 11th daughter
    - Married Garma Sodnam (噶爾瑪索諾木; d. 1663), of the Abaga Borjigin clan, in December 1647/January 1648
  - Bomubogor (博穆博果爾), Prince Xiangzhao of the First Rank (襄昭親王; 20 January 1642 – 22 August 1656), 11th son
- Pure Consort Kanghui (康惠淑妃), of the Abaga Borjigin clan (博爾濟吉特氏; 1606 – June/July 1667), personal name Batmadzoo (巴特瑪璪)
- Secondary Consort (側福晉), of the Yehe Nara clan (葉赫那拉氏), personal name Wuyunzhu (烏雲珠)
  - Šose, Prince Chengzeyu of the First Rank (承澤裕親王 碩塞; 17 January 1629 – 12 January 1655), fifth son
- Secondary Consort (側福晉), of the Jarud Borjigin clan (博爾濟吉特氏)
  - Princess of the First Rank (固倫公主; 15 December 1633 – April/May 1649), sixth daughter
    - Married Kuazha (誇札; d. 1649), of the Irgen Gioro clan, in December 1644/January 1645
  - Ninth daughter (5 November 1635 – April/May 1652)
    - Married Hashang (哈尚; d. 1651), of the Borjigin clan, in October/November 1648
- Mistress (格格), of the Yanja clan (顏扎氏)
  - Yebušu (葉布舒), Duke of the Second Rank (輔國公; 25 November 1627 – 23 October 1690), fourth son
- Mistress (格格), of the Nara clan (那拉氏)
  - Lady of the Second Rank (縣君; 30 November 1635 – August/September 1661), 10th daughter
    - Married Huisai (輝塞; d. 1651), of the Gūwalgiya clan, in September/October 1651
  - Gose (高塞), Duke Quehou of the First Rank (愨厚鎮國公; 12 March 1637 – 5 September 1670), sixth son
  - 13th daughter (16 August 1638 – May/June 1657)
    - Married Laha (拉哈), of the Gūwalgiya clan, in March/April 1652
- Mistress (格格), of the Sain Noyon clan (賽音諾顏氏)
  - Lady of the Third Rank (鄉君; 9 April 1637 – November/December 1678), 12th daughter
    - Married Bandi (班迪; d. 1700), of the Khorchin Borjigin clan, in September/October 1651
- Mistress (格格), of the Irgen Gioro clan (伊爾根覺羅氏)
  - Cangšu (常舒), Duke of the Second Rank (輔國公; 13 May 1637 – 13 February 1700), seventh son
- Mistress (格格), of the Keyikelei clan (克伊克勒氏)
  - Toose (韜塞), Duke of the Second Rank (輔國公; 12 March 1639 – 23 March 1695), tenth son
- Mistress (格格), of the Cilei clan (奇壘氏; d. 1645)
  - Princess Kechun of the Second Rank (和碩恪純公主; 7 January 1642 – December 1704 or January 1705), 14th daughter
    - Married Wu Yingxiong (吳應熊; 1634 – 18 May 1674), on 9 October 1653, and had issue (three sons, one daughter)

== In popular culture ==
- Portrayed by Kim Yoon-hyung in the 1981 KBS1 TV series Daemyeong
- Portrayed by Tang Guoqiang in the 2003 TV series The Affaire in the Swing Age
- Portrayed by Liu Dekai in the 2003 TV series Xiaozhuang Mishi
- Portrayed by Jiang Wen in the 2006 TV series Da Qing Fengyun
- Portrayed by Hawick Lau in the 2012 TV series In Love With Power
- Portrayed by Nam Kyung-eub in the 2013 JTBC TV series Blooded Palace: The War of Flowers
- Portrayed by Byun Joo-hyun in the 2014 tvN TV series The Three Musketeers
- Portrayed by Jung Sung-woon in the 2015 MBC TV series Hwajung
- Portrayed by Nie Yuan in the 2015 TV series The Legend of Xiaozhuang
- Portrayed by Raymond Lam in the 2017 TV series Rule the World
- Portrayed by Kim Beob-rae in the 2017 film The Fortress
- Portrayed by Kim Jun-won in the 2023 MBC TV series My Dearest

== See also ==
- Chinese emperors family tree (late)
- Qing conquest of the Ming
- Daily life in the Forbidden City, Wan Yi, Wang Shuqing, Lu Yanzhen. ISBN 0-670-81164-5.
- Qing imperial genealogy (清皇室四譜).
- Qing dynasty Taizong's veritable records (清太宗實錄)
- Royal archives of the Qing dynasty (清宮档案).
- Samjeondo Monument

== Notes ==
Hong Taiji House of Aisin Gioro Born: 28 November 1592 Died: 21 September 1643
Regnal titles
| Preceded by Nurhaci | Khan of Later Jin; 1626–1636 | Qing dynasty was established in 1636. Himself became the Emperor of the Qing dynasty. |
| New title Qing dynasty was established in 1636 | Emperor of the Qing dynasty 1636–1643 | Succeeded by Shunzhi Emperor |
