= Aohans =

Aohan
- Territories of the Aohan in 1911

Regions with significant populations

Languages
- Aohan subdialect of Southern Mongolian dialect

Religion
- Tibetan Buddhism, Mongolian shamanism

Related ethnic groups
- Mongols, Southern Mongols

The Aohan (Mongolian: ᠠᠤᠬᠠᠨ; Аохан; simplified Chinese: 敖汉部; traditional Chinese: 敖漢部) are a Southern Mongol subgroup in Aohan Banner, Inner Mongolia, China.

== Etymology ==
The ethnonym "Aohan" or "Uuhan" translated from Mongolian language means “elders”, “venerable”.

== History ==
In the 16th century, a descendant of Genghis Khan in the 18th generation migrated to the territory of modern Chifeng in Inner Mongolia, so the local Mongols were respectfully called “aohan” (“elders”, “venerable”). When the Mongols submitted to the Manchus in the first half of the 17th century, the latter introduced their eight-banner system among the Mongols, and the local Mongols were united into a Aohan Banner (Aohan Khoshun in Mongolian).

== See also ==
- Demographics of China

== Sources ==
- Zheng, Yue (2018). "A New Interpretation of the Mongolian Inscription on qWan shou baitaq in Aohan Banner". A New Interpretation of the Mongolian Inscription on "Wan shou baita" in Aohan Banner (PDF). Atlantis Press. doi:10.2991/asssd-18.2018.24. ISBN 978-94-6252-500-9.
