= Aohan Banner =

Aohan Banner 敖汉旗 • ᠠᠣᠬᠠᠨ ᠬᠣᠰᠢᠭᠤ
- Banner
- Location in Inner Mongolia Aohan (China)
- Coordinates: 42°17′N 119°55′E
- Country: China
- Autonomous region: Inner Mongolia
- Prefecture-level city: Chifeng
- Banner seat: Xinhui

Area
  - Total: 8,294 km^{2} (3,202 sq mi)
- Elevation: 575 m (1,886 ft)

Population (2020)
  - Total: 448,712
  - Density: 54.10/km^{2} (140.1/sq mi)
- Time zone: UTC+8 (China Standard)
- Website: www.ahq.gov.cn

Aohan Banner

Chinese name
- Simplified Chinese: 敖汉旗
- Traditional Chinese: 敖漢旗
Transcriptions
Standard Mandarin
- Hanyu Pinyin: Áohàn Qí

Mongolian name
- Mongolian Cyrillic: Аухан хошуу
- Mongolian script: ᠠᠣᠬᠠᠨ ᠬᠣᠰᠢᠭᠤ
Transcriptions
- SASM/GNC: Aoqan qosiɣu

Aohan Banner (Mongolian: ᠠᠣᠬᠠᠨ ᠬᠣᠰᠢᠭᠤ; Chinese: 敖汉旗) is a banner of southeastern Inner Mongolia, China, bordering Liaoning province to the south. It is under the administration of Chifeng City, 85 kilometres (53 mi) to the west.

== Administrative divisions ==
Aohan Banner is made up of 2 subdistricts, 11 towns, 4 townships, and 1 sum.

Name	Simplified Chinese	Hanyu Pinyin	Mongolian (Hudum Script)	Mongolian (Cyrillic)	Administrative division code
Subdistricts
Xinzhou Subdistrict	新州街道	Xīnzhōu Jiēdào	ᠰᠢᠨ ᠵᠧᠦ ᠵᠡᠭᠡᠯᠢ ᠭᠤᠳᠤᠮᠵᠢ	Шин жүү зээл гудамж	150430404
Huizhou Subdistrict	惠州街道	Huìzhōu Jiēdào	ᠬᠤᠢ ᠵᠧᠦ ᠵᠡᠭᠡᠯᠢ ᠭᠤᠳᠤᠮᠵᠢ	Хой жүү зээл гудамж	150430405
Towns
Xinhui Town	新惠镇	Xīnhuì Zhèn	ᠰᠢᠨ ᠬᠤᠢ ᠪᠠᠯᠭᠠᠰᠤ	Шин хой балгас	150430100
Sijiazi Town	四家子镇	Sìjiāzǐ Zhèn	ᠰᠧ ᠵᠢᠶᠠ ᠽᠢ ᠪᠠᠯᠭᠠᠰᠤ	С жье зи балгас	150430101
Changsheng Town	长胜镇	Chángshèng Zhèn	ᠴᠠᠩ ᠱᠧᠩ ᠪᠠᠯᠭᠠᠰᠤ	Цан шен балгас	150430102
Beizifu Town	贝子府镇	Bèizǐfǔ Zhèn	ᠪᠡᠢᠰᠢ ᠶᠢᠨ ᠬᠣᠷᠢᠶ᠎ᠠ ᠪᠠᠯᠭᠠᠰᠤ	Байшийн хороо балгас	150430103
Sidaowanzi Town	四道湾子镇	Sìdàowānzǐ Zhèn	ᠰᠧ ᠳ᠋ᠣᠤ ᠸᠠᠨᠽᠢ ᠪᠠᠯᠭᠠᠰᠤ	С доо ванци балгас	150430104
Xiawa Town	下洼镇	Xiàwā Zhèn	ᠰᠢᠶᠠ ᠸᠠ ᠪᠠᠯᠭᠠᠰᠤ	Шье ваа балгас	150430105
Jinchanggouliang Town	金厂沟梁镇	Jīnchǎnggōuliáng Zhèn	ᠵᠢᠨ ᠴᠠᠩ ᠭᠧᠦ ᠯᠢᠶᠠᠩ ᠪᠠᠯᠭᠠᠰᠤ	Гийн цан гүү лан балгас	150430106
Xinglongwa Town	兴隆洼镇	Xīnglóngwā Zhèn	ᠰᠢᠩ ᠯᠦᠩ ᠸᠠ ᠪᠠᠯᠭᠠᠰᠤ	Шин лүн ваа балгас	150430107
Huangyangwa Town	黄羊洼镇	Huángyángwā Zhèn	ᠬᠤᠸᠠᠩ ᠶᠠᠩ ᠸᠠ ᠪᠠᠯᠭᠠᠰᠤ	Хуан ян ваа балгас	150430108
Gurban Hua Town	古鲁板蒿镇	Gǔlǔbǎnhāo Zhèn	ᠭᠤᠷᠪᠠᠨᠬᠤᠸᠠ ᠪᠠᠯᠭᠠᠰᠤ	Гурванхуа балгас	150430109
Nohot Town	牛古吐镇	Niúgǔtǔ Zhèn	ᠨᠥᠬᠡᠲᠦ ᠪᠠᠯᠭᠠᠰᠤ	Нүхт балгас	150430110
Townships
Mutouyingzi Township	木头营子乡	Mùtouyíngzi Xiāng	ᠮᠣᠳᠣᠨ ᠠᠢᠯ ᠰᠢᠶᠠᠩ	Модон айл шиян	150430202
Fengshou Township	丰收乡	Fēngshōu Xiāng	ᠹᠧᠩ ᠱᠧᠦ ᠰᠢᠶᠠᠩ	Фен шев шиян	150430204
Manihan Township	玛尼罕乡	Mǎníhǎn Xiāng	ᠮᠠᠨᠢᠬᠠᠨ ᠰᠢᠶᠠᠩ	Манихан шиян	150430205
Salbar Township	萨力巴乡	Sàlìbā Xiāng	ᠰᠠᠯᠪᠤᠷᠢ ᠰᠢᠶᠠᠩ	Салбар шиян	150430206
Sum
Oroin Som Sum	敖润苏莫苏木	Áorùnsūmò Sūmù	ᠣᠷᠣᠢ ᠶᠢᠨ ᠰᠦᠮ᠎ᠡ ᠰᠤᠮᠤ	Оройн сүм сум	150430207

- Other: Aohan Banner Industrial Park (敖汉旗工业园区)

== Climate ==
Climate data for Aohan Banner, elevation 579 m (1,900 ft), (1991–2020 normals, extremes 1981–2010)
Month	Jan	Feb	Mar	Apr	May	Jun	Jul	Aug	Sep	Oct	Nov	Dec	Year
Record high °C (°F)	10.2 (50.4)	19.7 (67.5)	26.9 (80.4)	32.0 (89.6)	37.6 (99.7)	38.9 (102.0)	41.7 (107.1)	37.5 (99.5)	35.0 (95.0)	28.5 (83.3)	21.9 (71.4)	14.4 (57.9)	41.7 (107.1)
Mean daily maximum °C (°F)	−4.6 (23.7)	−0.3 (31.5)	6.9 (44.4)	16.0 (60.8)	23.1 (73.6)	27.1 (80.8)	28.9 (84.0)	27.6 (81.7)	23.1 (73.6)	14.9 (58.8)	4.3 (39.7)	−2.9 (26.8)	13.7 (56.6)
Daily mean °C (°F)	−11.7 (10.9)	−7.6 (18.3)	−0.1 (31.8)	9.1 (48.4)	16.5 (61.7)	21.0 (69.8)	23.3 (73.9)	21.6 (70.9)	16.1 (61.0)	8.0 (46.4)	−2.0 (28.4)	−9.5 (14.9)	7.1 (44.7)
Mean daily minimum °C (°F)	−17.4 (0.7)	−13.9 (7.0)	−6.8 (19.8)	2.3 (36.1)	9.7 (49.5)	15.1 (59.2)	18.2 (64.8)	16.2 (61.2)	9.6 (49.3)	1.9 (35.4)	−7.6 (18.3)	−15 (5)	1.0 (33.9)
Record low °C (°F)	−28.8 (−19.8)	−28.3 (−18.9)	−21.9 (−7.4)	−10.7 (12.7)	−2.5 (27.5)	3.0 (37.4)	9.4 (48.9)	5.3 (41.5)	−2.6 (27.3)	−11.2 (11.8)	−23.9 (−11.0)	−27.3 (−17.1)	−28.8 (−19.8)
Average precipitation mm (inches)	1.5 (0.06)	2.8 (0.11)	7.7 (0.30)	18.2 (0.72)	43.2 (1.70)	76.7 (3.02)	111.1 (4.37)	76.9 (3.03)	35.2 (1.39)	20.1 (0.79)	9.0 (0.35)	2.1 (0.08)	404.5 (15.92)
Average precipitation days (≥ 0.1 mm)	2.0	2.1	3.8	5.4	8.7	12.6	12.0	10.1	7.0	5.0	3.3	2.5	74.5
Average snowy days	2.8	3.1	4.1	2.1	0.1	0	0	0	0	1.7	3.9	3.4	21.2
Average relative humidity (%)	48	42	39	38	43	57	69	70	59	50	49	49	51
Mean monthly sunshine hours	219.5	220.5	263.4	257.1	289.3	268.1	266.5	273.9	260.7	246.7	203.0	202.2	2,970.9
Percentage possible sunshine	75	73	71	64	64	59	58	64	71	73	70	72	68
Source: China Meteorological Administration

Climate data for Xinglongwa Town (Baoguotu), Aohan Banner, elevation 401 m (1,316 ft), (1991–2020 normals)
Month	Jan	Feb	Mar	Apr	May	Jun	Jul	Aug	Sep	Oct	Nov	Dec	Year
Mean daily maximum °C (°F)	−4.4 (24.1)	0.1 (32.2)	7.4 (45.3)	16.6 (61.9)	23.7 (74.7)	27.4 (81.3)	29.0 (84.2)	27.9 (82.2)	23.6 (74.5)	15.6 (60.1)	4.9 (40.8)	−2.7 (27.1)	14.1 (57.4)
Daily mean °C (°F)	−10.8 (12.6)	−6.8 (19.8)	0.6 (33.1)	9.9 (49.8)	17.1 (62.8)	21.5 (70.7)	23.7 (74.7)	22.1 (71.8)	16.5 (61.7)	8.4 (47.1)	−1.6 (29.1)	−8.9 (16.0)	7.6 (45.8)
Mean daily minimum °C (°F)	−15.9 (3.4)	−12.5 (9.5)	−5.8 (21.6)	3.0 (37.4)	10.1 (50.2)	15.5 (59.9)	18.9 (66.0)	16.8 (62.2)	9.8 (49.6)	2.0 (35.6)	−7.1 (19.2)	−13.9 (7.0)	1.7 (35.1)
Average precipitation mm (inches)	1.3 (0.05)	2.0 (0.08)	5.9 (0.23)	16.0 (0.63)	41.9 (1.65)	84.5 (3.33)	113.1 (4.45)	78.1 (3.07)	33.2 (1.31)	17.1 (0.67)	7.2 (0.28)	1.7 (0.07)	402 (15.82)
Average precipitation days (≥ 0.1 mm)	1.8	2.0	2.9	4.7	8.1	11.2	11.7	10.0	6.1	4.0	3.0	2.0	67.5
Average snowy days	2.7	2.9	3.6	1.9	0.1	0	0	0	0	1.1	3.4	3.0	18.7
Average relative humidity (%)	43	38	36	35	42	59	72	72	61	51	47	47	50
Mean monthly sunshine hours	216.5	218.2	262.8	258.4	286.1	261.2	250.9	259.9	256.6	243.6	199.9	202.8	2,916.9
Percentage possible sunshine	74	73	71	64	63	57	55	61	69	72	69	72	67
Source: China Meteorological Administration
