= Borjigin =

Member of Genghis Khan's Mongol sub-clan

Borjigin ᠪᠣᠷᠵᠢᠭᠢᠨ Боржигин Budunzar's Clan Kiyat Borjigin
- Seal

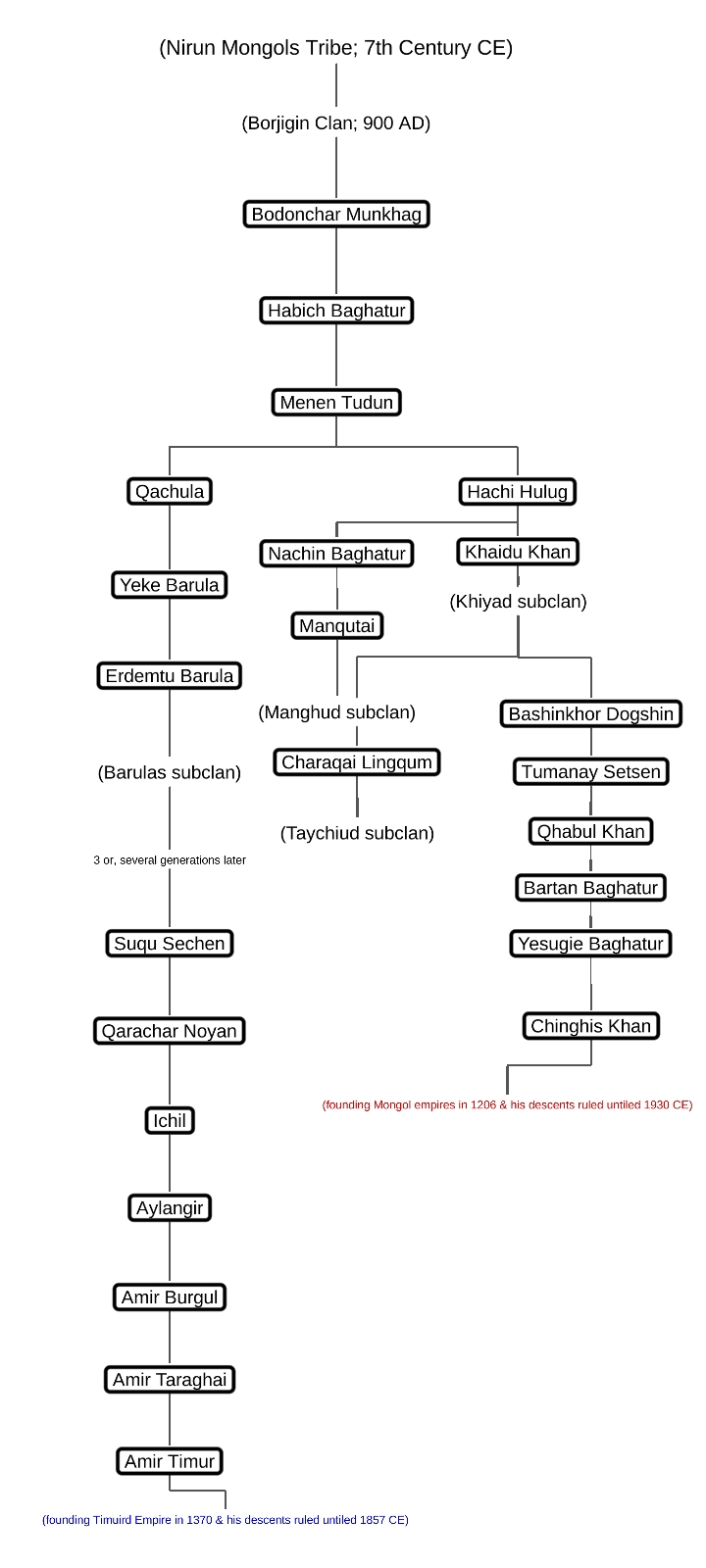
- The Geneological Family Tree Charts of Imperial Mongol Borjigin Dynasties and showing its major and main Sub-Clans (According to Secret Histories Of The Mongols Records)
- Country: Mongol Empire, Mongol states, Central Asian countries, Mongolia, China (Inner Mongolia and Xinjiang)
- Origin: Khamag Mongol
- Founded: c. 900 AD (early 10th-Century)
- Founder: Bodonchar Munkhag
- Final ruler: Maqsud Shah (in Asia); Alim Khan (in Central Asia); Navaanneren Setsen Khan (in East Asia); Şahin Giray (in Europe)
- Titles: Khagan, Khan, Ilkhan, Noyan, Tsar, Jonon, Khuntaij, General, Zasag, Darga, Yeronkhii Said, Baatar
- Connected families: Khongirad; Khanate; Division of the Mongol Empire; Timurid dynasty
- Estates: Mongolia; Russia; Central Asia; Iran; China
- Deposition: 1930
- Cadet branches: Chinggisids; Ögedeids; Jochids; Kuchumovs; Shaybanids; Mustafins; Girays; Ashtarkhanids; Töre; Toluids; Yuan (Kublaids); Zasagt Khan; Tüsheet Khan; Sain Noyon Khan; Sechen Khan; Altan Khan; Hulaguids; Chagataids; Khasars; Khorchins; Khoshuts; Khökhnuurs; Belguteids; Abaganar; Barlas; Timurid dynasty; Mughal dynasty; Hazāra of Muhammad Khwāja tribe; Mirza family; Manghud; Nogai dynasty; Manghit dynasty (Uzbeks); Khiyad; Tayichuds; Urud; Chonos

The Borjigin or Borjigids (Note: /ˈbɔːrdʒɪɡɪn/; Mongolian: Боржигин, romanized: Borzhigin, ᠪᠣᠷᠵᠢᠭᠢᠨ pronounced [ˈpɔrt͡ɕɘkɘŋ]; simplified Chinese: 孛儿只斤; traditional Chinese: 孛兒只斤; pinyin: Bó'érjìjǐn; Russian: Борджигин, romanized: Bordžigin; English plural: Borjigins or Borjigid (from Middle Mongolian); (Note: A Middle Mongolian plural-suffix -t has been written about by Éva Csáki in Middle Mongolian Loan Words in Volga Kipchak Languages.) Manchu plural^{?}:) are a Mongol tribal clan founded in the early 10th century by Bodonchar Munkhag. (Note: The Secret History of the Mongols traces it back to Yesugei's ancestor Bodonchar) The senior line of Borjigids provided ruling princes for Mongolia and Inner Mongolia until the 20th century. The clan formed the ruling class among the Mongols and other peoples of Central Asia and Eastern Europe. Today, the Borjigids are found in Mongolia, Inner Mongolia, Buryatia, Kalmykia, and Xinjiang, and genetic research shows that descent from Genghis Khan and Timur is common throughout Central and East Asia.

== Origin and name ==
According to the Secret History of the Mongols, the first Mongol was born from the union of a blue-grey wolf and a fallow doe. Their 11th-generation descendant, Alan Gua, was impregnated by a ray of light and begat five sons, the youngest being Bodonchar Munkhag, progenitor of the Borjigids. According to Rashid al-Din Hamadani, many of the older Mongolian tribes were founded by members of the Borjigin clan, including the Barlas, Urud, Manghud, Taichiud, Chonos, and Kiyat. Bodonchar's descendant Khabul Khan founded the Khamag Mongol confederation around 1131. His great-grandson Temüjin ruled the Khamag Mongol and unified the other Mongol tribes under him. He was declared Genghis Khan in 1206, thus establishing the Mongol Empire. His descendants are the Chinggisids.

The etymology of the word Borjigin is uncertain.

== History ==
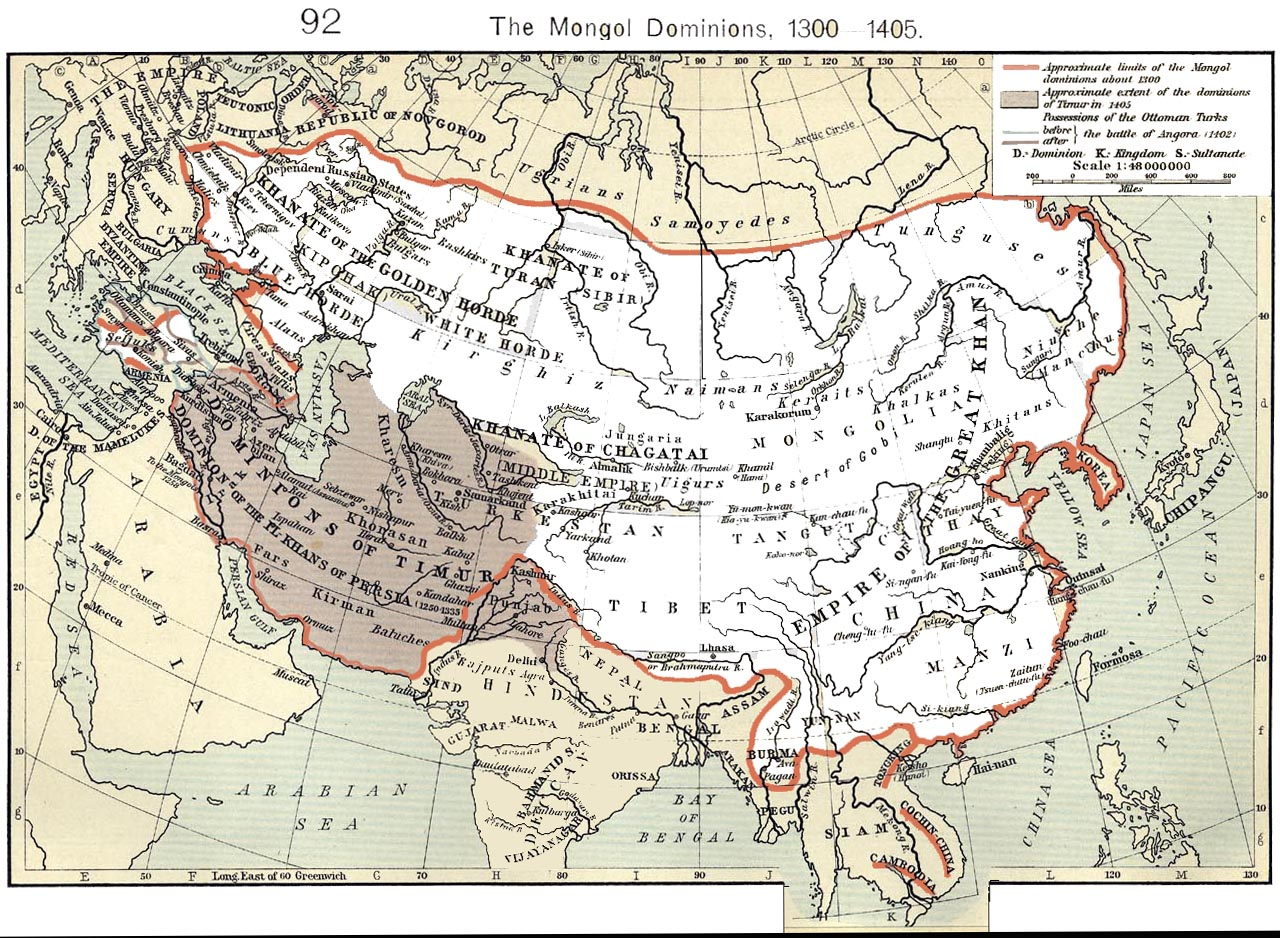
The Mongol Empire and its vassals, ca. 1300. The gray area is the later Timurid Empire.

Members of the Borjigin clan ruled over the Mongol Empire, dominating large lands stretching from Java to Iran and from Mainland Southeast Asia to Veliky Novgorod. Many of the ruling dynasties that took power following the disintegration of the Mongol Empire were of Chinggisid, and thus Borjigid, ancestry. These included the Chobanids, the Jalayirid Sultanate, the Barlas, the Manghud, the Khongirad, and the Oirats.

In 1368, the Borjigin-ruled Yuan dynasty was expelled from China following the advance of rebel forces that established the Ming dynasty. The last Yuan emperor, Toghon Temür, withdrew north of the Great Wall, where the court and its institutions continued to function in the Mongolian Plateau under what is conventionally known as the Northern Yuan.

The retreat of the Yuan court did not represent a sudden collapse but rather a strategic relocation, after which the Borjigin rulers maintained political authority over Mongolia and sought to reassert influence over China in subsequent decades.

=== Post-Mongol Empire ===
The term "Chinggisid" derives from the name of Genghis (Chinggis) Khan (c. 1162–1227 CE). Genghis and his successors created a vast empire stretching from the Sea of Japan to the Black Sea, which, beginning in 1259, divided into separate empires.

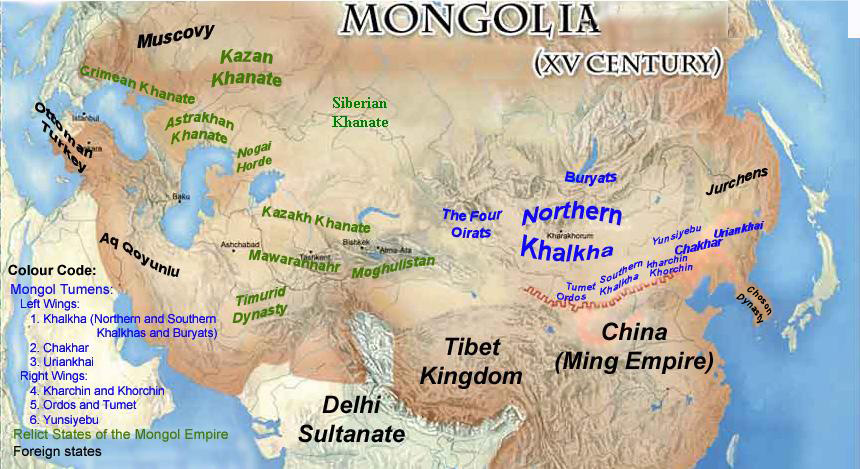
The Tumens of Mongolia proper and vassal states of the Mongol Empire by 1400

After the breakup of the Golden Horde, the Khiyad Borjigids continued to rule in Crimean Peninsula and Kazan until they were annexed by the Russian Empire in the late 18th century. In Mongolia, the Kublaids continued to reign as khagans of the Mongols, with brief interruptions by the descendants of Ögedei and Ariq Böke.

Under Dayan Khan (1480–1517), a broad Borjigid revival reestablished Borjigid supremacy among the Mongols in Mongolia proper. The Borjigin lineage constituted the ruling house of the Mongols, with authority distributed among various branches of the imperial family rather than concentrated in a single unified structure. During the period following the decline of centralized power, the descendants of Dayan Khan governed their respective appanages in a decentralized and semi-autonomous system, maintaining allegiance to the Chinggisid khan while exercising independent control over their own territories.

By the late 16th century, Northern Yuan which is the Post-Mongol Empire, was transformed into many separate Borjigin Mongol khanates under the descendants of Dayan Khan, including the four Khalkha Khanates, the Altan Khan of Tumed Mongols. The eastern Khorchin Mongols were under the Qasarids, and the Ongnigud and Abaqids were under the Belguteids and Temüge Odchigenids. A fragment of the Qasarids later migrated to western Mongolia, where they became known as the Khoshut which founded Khoshut Khanate by Gushi Khan.

Dayan Khan's youngest son, Gersenji Khuntaij, was given Mongol heartland which is the territory of present-day Mongolia. By the early 17th century most of Mongolia was held by his descendants. They formed four khanates of the Khalkha Mongols, from west to east:

- Altan Khanate (great-grandson of Gersenji Khuntaij) in the far west.
- Zasagt Khanate of the Khalkha Mongols founded by Laikhor Khan, a cousin of the Altan Khan.
- Tusheet Khanate of the Khalkha Mongols at Kharakhorum founded by Abtai Sain Khan, another grandson. This was the senior branch.
- Setsen Khanate of the Khalkha Mongols at the eastern part of modern Mongolia, founded by Sholoi Khan, a great-grandson.

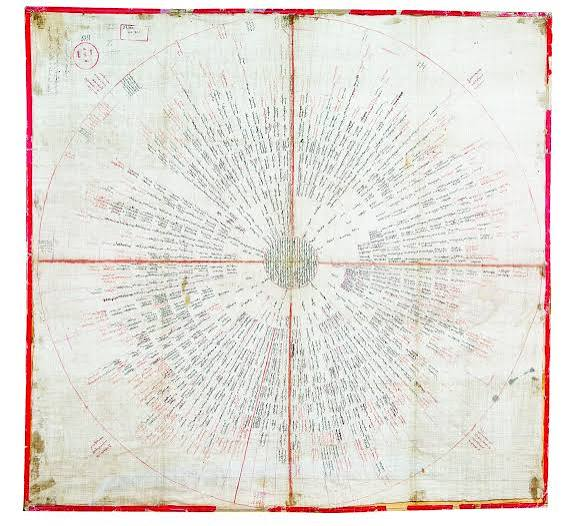
Mongol genealogical records of Khalkha Mongols, tracing the lineage from Genghis Khan through Kublai Khan and Dayan Khan to the Four Genghisid Khalkha Khanates and, later, the four Genghisid Khalkha aimags of the Bogd Khanate Mongolia 15th-20th centuries

The Qing dynasty respected the Borjigids and the early emperors married Khorchin Qasarids. Even among the pro-Qing Mongols, traces of the alternative tradition survived. Aci Lomi, a banner general, wrote his History of the Borjigid Clan in 1732–35. The 18th century and 19th century, Qing nobility was adorned by the descendants of the early Mongol adherents including the Borjigin.

Asian dynasties descended from Genghis Khan included the Yuan dynasty in China, the Ilkhanate in Persia, the Jochids of the Golden Horde, the Shaybanids in Siberia and Central Asia, and the Astrakhan Khanate in Central Asia. Chinggisid descent played a crucial role in Tatar politics. For instance, Mamai had to exercise his authority through a succession of puppet khans but could not assume the title of khan himself because he lacked Chinggisid lineage.

- The Chinggisid principle, or golden lineage, was the rule of inheritance laid down in the (Yassa), the legal code attributed to Genghis Khan.
- A Chinggisid prince was one who could trace direct descent from Genghis Khan in the male line, and who could therefore claim high respect among Mongol and Turks and in Asia.
- The Chinggisid states were the successor states or khanates after the Mongol empire broke up following the death of Genghis Khan's sons and their successors.
- The term Chinggisid people was used to describe the people of Genghis Khan's armies who came in contact with Europeans. It applied primarily to the Golden Horde, led by Batu Khan, a grandson of Genghis. Members of the Horde were predominantly Kipchak-speaking peoples. Although the aristocracy was largely Mongol, Mongols were never more than a small minority in the armies and the lands they conquered.) Europeans often (incorrectly) referred to the people of the Golden Horde as "Tartars".

Babur and Humayun, founders of the Mughal Empire in India, asserted their authority as Chinggisids, claiming descent through their maternal lineage.

The Chinggisid also include such dynasties and houses as Giray, Töre, House of Siberia, Ar begs, Yaushev family and other. The one of last ruling Chinggisids was Maqsud Shah, Khan of Kumul from 1908 to 1930.

The three Khalkha khanates included those ruled by Sechen Khan, Zasagt Khan, and Tüsheet Khan, who continued to regard themselves as the legitimate Khagans and successors of the Northern Yuan until Qing annexion 1691. Although much of their independent political authority declined during Qing rule, Borjigin nobles proclaimed Mongolia’s independence in 1911 and established the Bogd Khanate. The three Khalkha khanates, along with their aristocratic ranks and titles, continued to exist within the Mongolian People’s Republic until around 1930. The last ruling Chinggisid and Borjigin aristocrat holding princely and monarchical status, Navaanneren Setsen Khan, was executed in 1937.

=== Modern relevance ===
The Borjigin held power over Mongolia for many centuries (even during Qing period) and only lost power when Communists took control in the 20th century. Aristocratic descent was something to be forgotten in the socialist period. Joseph Stalin's associates executed some 30,000 Mongols including Borjigin nobles in a series of campaigns against their culture and religion. Clan association has lost its practical relevance in the 20th century, but is still considered a matter of honour and pride by many Mongolians. In 1920s, the communist regime banned the use of clan names. When the ban was lifted again in 1997, and people were told they had to have surnames, some families had lost knowledge about their clan association. One of the many communist Borjigin Mongols who founded the Mongolian People's Republic, Anandyn Amar, a member of the People's Great Khural and a former prime minister, was executed by the government in 1941 as a result of internal Mongolian class struggle. After that, under the ideology of communism, the principle of legal and social equality replaced hereditary aristocratic privilege, and Borjigin descent permanently ceased to be a source of political authority in Mongolia. Around 700,000 people are registered under the family name Borjigin in Mongolia. The label Borjigin is used as a measure of cultural supremacy.

In Inner Mongolia, the Borjigid or Kiyad name became the basis for many Chinese surnames adopted by ethnic Inner Mongols. The Inner Mongolian Borjigin Taijis took the surname Bao (鲍, from Borjigid) and Qi (奇, Qiyat) in Ordos. A genetic research has proposed that as many as 16 million men from populations as far apart as Hazaras in the West and Hezhe people to the east may have Borjigid-Kiyad ancestry. The Qiyat clan name is still found among the Kazakhs, Uzbeks and Nogai Karakalpaks.

== Yuan dynasty family tree ==
Genghis Khan founded the Mongol Empire in 1206. His grandson, Kublai Khan, after defeating his younger brother and rival claimant to the throne Ariq Böke, founded the Yuan dynasty in 1271, also known as Dai Ön qemeqü Yeqe Mongɣol Ulus in Mongolian. The dynasty was overthrown by the Ming dynasty during the reign of Toghon Temür in 1368, but it survived in the Mongolian Plateau, known as the Northern Yuan dynasty. Although the throne was usurped by Esen Taishi of the Oirat Mongols in 1453 and he declared himself "Tengri Mandate the Great Khan of Great Yuan Dynasty", he was overthrown in the next year. A recovery of the khaganate was achieved by Dayan Khan, but the territory was segmented by his descendants. The last great khan Ligden died in 1634 and his son Ejei Khongor Khan submitted himself to Khuntaij the next year, ending the Northern Yuan regime. The four Genghisid Khalkha Mongol Khanates; Tusheet Khanate, Setsen Khanate, Zasagt Khanate, Altan Khanate, the last legitimate remnants of the Northern Yuan, ruled by the descendants of Dayan Khan's youngest son, Prince Gersenji, remained independent in Mongol heartland until Qing annexation of 1691. However, the Borjigin nobles continued to rule their subjects until the 20th century under the Khalkha Khans during Qing dynasty, Bogd Khanate and Mongolian People's Republic. (Note: Wada Sei did pioneer work on this field, and Honda Minobu and Okada Hidehiro modified it, using newly discovered Persian (Timurid) records and Mongol chronicles.)

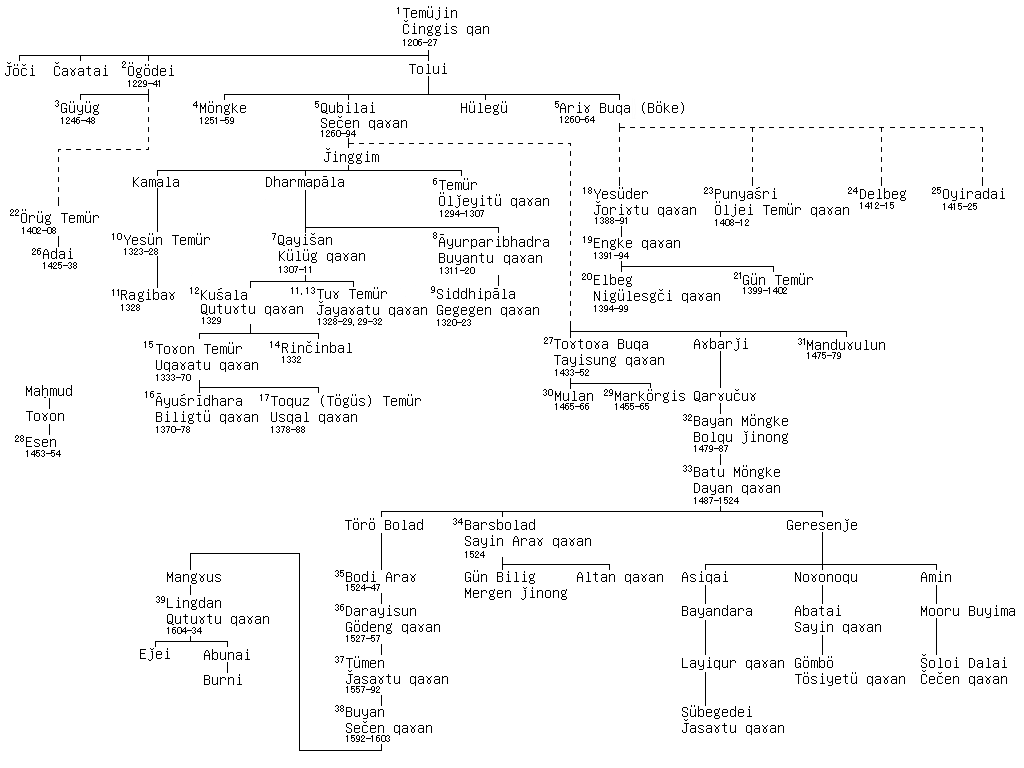

In terms of existing, Great Yuan Dynasty as official name continued until 1634 with the death of Ligden Khan.

== See also ==
- History of Mongolia
- Mongolian names
- List of medieval Mongol tribes and clans
- Turco-Mongol tradition
