= Sholoi Khan =

First Setsen Khan and founder of the Setsen Khanate of Khalkha Mongols

Sholoi Setsen Khan
- Setsen Khan of the Setsen Khanate of Khalkha

First Setsen Khan of the Khalkha Mongol
- Reign: c. 1630–1650
- Predecessor: Title established
- Successor: Babu Setsen Khan
- Born: 1577; Khentii Mountains, Northern Yuan Dynasty
- Died: 1650 (aged 72–73); Khentii Mountains, Setsen Khanate
Names
- Sholoi Setsen Khan (ᠱᠣᠯᠥᠢ ᠰᠡᠴᠡᠨ ᠬᠠᠭᠠᠨ; Шолой Сэцэн хаан)
- House: Borjigin
- Father: Möru Buima Noyan
- Religion: Tibetan Buddhism

Sholoi Setsen Khan (Note: Also romanized as Sholoi Sechen Khan; Mongolian scholarly transliteration: Šoloi Sečen Khan.) was the first Setsen Khan of the Khalkha Mongols and the founder of the Setsen Khan line, which ruled the Setsen Khanate of eastern Khalkha. He belonged to the Borjigin lineage descending from Dayan Khan through Gersenji Khongtaiji. His elevation as Setsen Khan is generally placed to the weakening of Ligdan Khan's power around 1630, and was connected both with internal eastern Khalkha politics, as well as the movement of Southern Mongol groups away from Ligdan Khan's authority.

Sholoi played an important role in early relations between the Khalkha khanates and the Manchu Later Jin state, which became the Qing dynasty in 1636. In 1635, he and Tüsheet Khan Gümbü jointly sent envoys to Hong Taiji, while Sholoi also attempted to draw Chahar remnants to himself and continued trade with the Ming dynasty. His involvement in the 1646 flight of the Sönid chief Tenggis to the eastern Khalkha led to one of the first major military clashes between the Qing and the Khalkha. Sholoi died in 1650

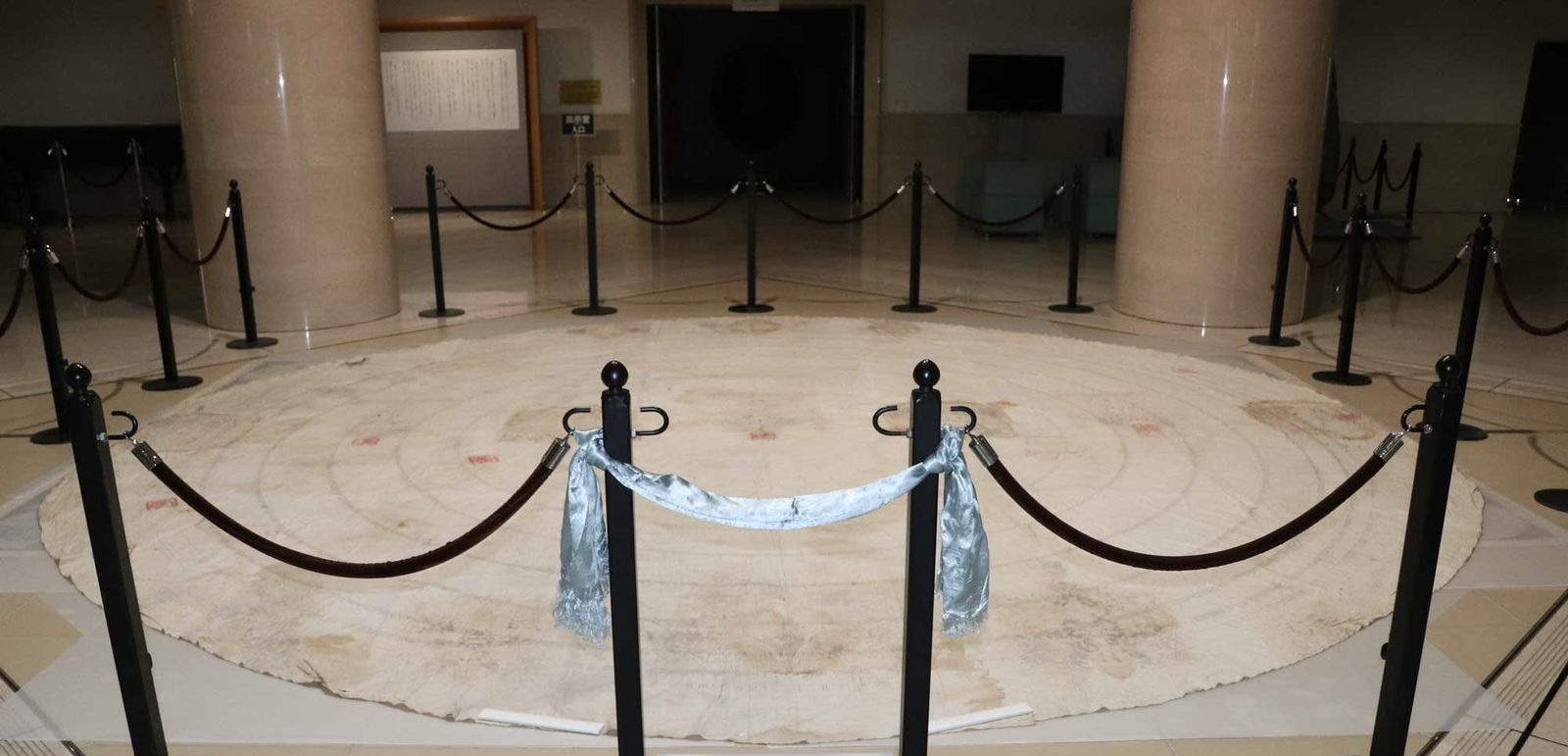
Genealogical records of the Eastern Khalkha Mongols tracing the lineage from Genghis Khan through Kublai Khan, Dayan Khan, Sholoi Khan, and the descendants of Sholoi Khan. 16th-20th centuries.

== Background and genealogy ==
Sholoi was a descendant of Gersenji Khongtaiji, the son of Dayan Khan who became the ancestor of the Khalkha ruling houses. Gersenji's descendants formed the major ruling branches of northern Khalkha. Sholoi belonged to the line of Gersenji's fourth son Amin Dural Noyan. His genealogical line was: Dayan Khan, Gersenji Khongtaiji, Amin Dural Noyan, Möru Buima Noyan, and Sholoi.

In the early organization of the Khalkha, the Left Wing was led principally by descendants of Gersenji's third son Noyonokhu Üizen Noyan and fourth son Amin Dural Noyan. The Tüsheet Khan house descended from Noyonokhu Üizen Noyan, while the Setsen Khan house descended from Amin Dural Noyan. Sholoi therefore belonged to the same broad Khalkha Left Wing political sphere as the Tüsheet Khan house, but represented a separate branch of Gersenji's descendants.

The other major Khalkha ruling houses included the Zasagt Khan house of the Khalkha Right Wing and the Altan Khan of the Khalkha line of the Khotgoid. Together, these houses formed the main political framework of seventeenth-century Khalkha before its incorporation into the Qing empire.

== Rise as Setsen Khan ==
Sholoi's elevation as Setsen Khan is thought to have occurred around 1630. After Gümbü became Tüsheet Khan, he supported Sholoi's elevation as Setsen Khan. Sholoi's rise was therefore not simply the result of Southern Mongol groups attaching themselves to him, but also formed part of the political consolidation of the Khalkha Left Wing.

The political background to Sholoi's rise was the weakening of central Mongol authority under Ligdan Khan of the Northern Yuan. Ligdan attempted to reassert authority over the Mongols, attacking the Kharachin and occupying the Tümed in 1628, and striking as far as the Khalkha in 1630. His campaigns pushed several Chahar-affiliated and Southern Mongol groups to seek protection either from Hong Taiji's state or from Khalkha leaders such as Sholoi.

Several Southern Mongol groups or segments of groups became connected with Sholoi's following, including the Moominggan, Abaga, Abaganar, Hochid, Sönid, and Üjümchin. These groups relied on Sholoi because of earlier marriage relations, adjacent pasturelands, and the desire to escape the turmoil caused by Ligdan Khan's campaigns. Their attachment to Sholoi strengthened his position and helped make the Setsen Khan line a major force in eastern Khalkha.

== Relations with Ligdan Khan and Chahar remnants ==
Ligdan Khan's death in Qinghai in 1634 altered the political situation in eastern Inner Asia. Many Chahar chiefs submitted to Hong Taiji, and most Southern Mongol groups came under Manchu influence. In this context, Sholoi and Tüsheet Khan Gümbü sent envoys to Hong Taiji in the fifth lunar month of 1635.

At the same time, Sholoi was not simply seeking friendly relations with Hong Taiji. He also sent letters to Tai Taikhu, the widow of Ligdan Khan, and to Ejei, Ligdan Khan's son, urging them to submit to him. The letter passed into Qing hands, although Hong Taiji's reaction is not recorded. This episode shows that Sholoi was competing for influence over the remnants of Ligdan Khan's Chahar polity while also opening relations with the Manchu state.

== Relations with Later Jin/Qing and Ming trade ==
Before the rise of Qing power, the Khalkha had traded with the Ming dynasty at Datong and Xuanfu through intermediaries such as the Guihua Cheng Tümed and the Kharachin. After Ligdan Khan acquired trading rights at Datong and Xuanfu, Khalkha trade with the Ming was temporarily interrupted. Following Ligdan's death, Sholoi reopened trade with the Ming at Datong in the first lunar month of 1635.

In the eighth lunar month of that year, Yoto, who was stationed at Guihua Cheng, received information that envoys connected with Setsen Khan and other chiefs, together with Üjümchin people, had traded with the Ming through Guihua Cheng. Later Jin forces pursued them. In the twelfth lunar month, Sholoi again sent Hong Taiji a letter expressing friendly intentions. The letter was also sent in the names of chiefs from Southern Mongol groups that had not yet submitted to the Later Jin, including the Üjümchin, Sönid, Hochid, and Abaga. Sholoi did not, however, mention the earlier trade with the Ming or the pursuit of the envoys.

In 1636, Hong Taiji warned Sholoi against trading with the Ming. He compared Sholoi's actions with those of Ligdan Khan, implying that continued relations with the Ming could provoke military action. Sholoi did not clearly agree to end the trade and later continued to conduct it independently at Datong and Xuanfu. Qing forces subsequently captured Setsen Khan's envoys and confiscated their livestock when they encountered them in connection with trade with the Ming.

== Wider Mongol and Oirat politics ==
Sholoi's career coincided with a period of changing relations among the Khalkha, the Oirats, the Manchu state, and Tibetan Buddhist powers. The Khalkha Right Wing under Zasagtu Khan sought alliance with the Oirats, and the Mongol-Oirat assembly of 1640 produced a legal code intended to regulate relations among Mongol and Oirat polities. Sholoi should be understood as part of this larger political world rather than only as a local eastern Khalkha ruler.

The period also saw the activity of Choghtu Khong Tayiji, a Khalkha noble associated with anti-Gelug and pro-Chahar politics, and Güshi Khan, the Khoshut-Oirat ruler who defeated Choghtu and became a major protector of the Gelug school in Tibet. These events formed the religious and political background to Khalkha politics during Sholoi's reign.

== The Tenggis incident ==
In 1646, Tenggis, chief of the Sönid, fled from the Qing to the Khalkha Left Wing. The Sönid had previously been among the Southern Mongol groups connected with Sholoi before some of their leaders submitted to Qing. The Qing treated Tenggis's flight as a rebellion and dispatched a punitive army under Dodo, Hošoi Deyu Prince. At the beginning of the campaign, the Qing regarded not only Tenggis but also Setsen Khan as an enemy.

The Qing army pursued Tenggis into Khalkha territory and clashed with forces of the Khalkha Left Wing. In the course of the campaign, Qing forces captured a princess who had been married to Tenggis during Hong Taiji's reign, killed members of Tenggis's following, and seized large numbers of people and livestock. The Qing also attacked and plundered taijis and pastoral people of the Khalkha Left Wing.

The Khalkha Left Wing resisted the Qing army. Qing records state that on 13 July a force of about 20,000 men led by two sons of Tüsheet Khan attacked the Qing army, and that on the following day a force of about 30,000 men led by four sons of Setsen Khan attacked. The Qing defeated these forces but failed to capture Tenggis or Setsen Khan, and then began its return. Later Qing correspondence referred to fighting with Danjin Toyin, or Danjin Lama, and Dalai Jinong. Dalai Jinong has been identified with Anangda, a son of Sholoi.

The incident transformed Qing–Khalkha relations. After the campaign, the Qing demanded that the Khalkha capture and return Tenggis. Although the Qing had initially treated Sholoi as an enemy, changing circumstances in China proper and around Datong made it difficult for the Qing to dispatch another army against the Khalkha Left Wing. The Qing therefore temporarily softened its position and sought to settle the problem through the return of Tenggis rather than by pursuing Setsen Khan's guilt directly.

The Tenggis affair also involved the Khalkha Right Wing. Zasagtu Khan attempted to intervene in the problem between the Qing and the Khalkha Left Wing, but the Qing rejected his independent mediation and insisted on handling the matter under its own authority. Later Qing correspondence again raised the accusation that Sholoi had conspired to take back the Sönid, showing that the Tenggis problem remained central to Qing pressure on the Khalkha.

== Aftermath ==
The Tenggis incident became one of the main origins of the later Qing demand that Khalkha rulers swear oaths and regulate their tribute relations with the Qing. Under the regency of Dorgon, Qing policy toward the Khalkha changed according to the wider military situation during the Ming-Qing transition. At times the Qing compromised because it could not afford another major campaign against the Khalkha, but later it hardened its position and pressed the Khalkha rulers to accept Qing-defined oath and tribute procedures.

In early 1649, amid the rebellion of the Datong commander Jiang Xiang, Qing concern over the Khalkha frontier increased again. While moving to deal with the Datong crisis, Dorgon received reports that forces and horses connected with Setsen Khan were gathered within about ten days' distance of Qing territory. He turned from Zhangjiakou toward the Khalkha and ordered troops from the outer-vassal Mongols to assemble, but the movement was soon cancelled because the horses were exhausted and water was lacking on the route. The episode shows that the Qing still regarded Sholoi's Khalkha Left Wing as a possible military threat after the Tenggis campaign, even though no new full campaign followed.

These arrangements were completed only after Sholoi's death. The Shunzhi court permitted the Khalkha Left Wing to present tribute after its leaders swore an oath in 1655. The Khalkha Right Wing completed a separate process of apology and oath-taking between 1657 and 1659. Sholoi therefore died before the Qing–Khalkha tribute relationship was formally regularized.

== Death and succession ==
Sholoi died in 1650. His death occurred before the Qing–Khalkha oath and regular tribute settlement of the mid-1650s. After his death, a power struggle took place among his sons. Babu, also known as Babu Setsen Khan, inherited the Setsen Khan title in 1655.

== Family ==
Sholoi's father was Möru Buima Noyan, son of Amin Dural Noyan.

One of Sholoi's principal wives was Aqai Khatun of the Abaga ruling house. She was the mother of eight of his sons. Another important wife was Tüküi Khatun of the Hochid or Qayučid. She had previously been married to a Hochid noble, and after entering Sholoi's household her sons were treated in Qing records as Sholoi's sons, although they were his stepchildren.

Sholoi's sons included:

- Mačari Ilden Tüsheet
- Čaburi Erdeni
- Laburi Erke Tayiji
- Bumba Darqan Qungtayiji
- Babu Dalai Setsen Khan, Sholoi's successor
- Čoiskeb Qungtayiji
- Čebden Setsen Jinong
- Badmadasi Dalai Qungtayiji
- Anangda, also called Dalai Jinong
- Shira Dashi Khatanbaatar
- Budajab Erdene Jinong

The order, titles and spellings of Sholoi's sons vary across Qing-period genealogical records and Mongolian chronicle traditions.

Sholoi's stepchildren through Tüküi Khatun included Garma Sewang and Bandi Mergen Chogkhor, who later submitted to the Qing with their followers.

== Legacy ==
Sholoi's reign marked the emergence of the Setsen Khan line as one of the major ruling houses of the Khalkha. His rise reflected both the inherited power of the Amin Dural branch of Gersenji's descendants and the broader fragmentation of Mongol authority during the final years of Ligdan Khan. Through his connections with Southern Mongol groups, his competition for influence over Chahar remnants, and his early negotiations with Hong Taiji, Sholoi became a central figure in the formation of eastern Khalkha politics in the first half of the seventeenth century.

The Tenggis incident made Sholoi central to an early military confrontation between the Qing and the Khalkha. Although the later oath and tribute settlement occurred after his death, Qing pressure on the Khalkha during the Shunzhi reign developed directly from problems that had involved Sholoi's relations with Southern Mongol groups such as the Sönid.

== Sources ==
- Sekine, Tomomi (2021). 17世紀清朝のハルハ゠モンゴル政策史研究 [A study of Qing policy toward Khalkha Mongols in the seventeenth century] (PDF) (PhD thesis) (in Japanese). University of Tsukuba.
- Gurma (September 2016). 1620～30年代にハルハ・セツェン・ハーン部に服属した漠南モンゴル諸部 [Southern Mongol groups that submitted to the Khalkha Setsen Khan division in the 1620s–1630s] (PDF). 日本とモンゴル [Japan and Mongolia] (in Japanese). 51 (1 (133)): 88–104.
- Taupier, Richard (2018). "Yeke Caaji: The Mongol-Oyirod Great Code of 1640: Innovation in Eurasian State Formation" (PDF). Asian Literature and Translation. 5 (1): 267–330. doi:10.18573/alt.38.
- Shastina, N. P. (1957). Шара туджи: Монгольская летопись XVII века [Shara Tuji: A Mongolian Chronicle of the Seventeenth Century] (in Russian). Moscow–Leningrad: Academy of Sciences of the USSR.
- Jambaldorj, Ts. (2024). Халхын дорно зам буюу Сэцэн хан аймгийн засаг ноёдын үе залгамжийг нягтлах нь [Examining the inheritance of Noyans in the eastern route of Qalq-a or Sečen Qan ayimaγ]. Чингис хааны өв, соёл судлал [Studia Chinggis Khaan Hereditatem et Culturam] (in Mongolian). 3 (1–14): 22–69.
