= Navaanneren =

Last Borjigin Khan of Chinggisid descent and the Setsen Khanate (1877–1937)

Tserendondovyn Navaanneren
- Цэрэндондовын Навааннэрэн
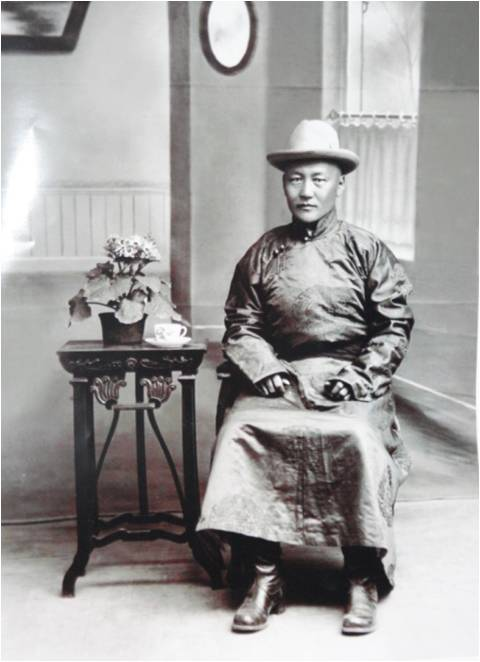
- Navaanneren as Minister of the Interior in Ulaanbaatar during the 1920s

Minister of Justice of Mongolia
- In office 1915–1920
- Preceded by: Mijiddorjiin Namsrai
- Succeeded by: Navaanlubsantsedengiin Magsarjab (Maksar-Khurts)

Minister of Interior of Mongolia
- In office 1922–1935
- Preceded by: Da Lama Puntsagdorj
- Succeeded by: ?

Sechen Khan
- In office 1910–1923
- Preceded by: Tserendorjin Demchigdorj
- Succeeded by: title abolished

Personal details
- Born: 1877 Sechen Khan Aimag, Outer Mongolia, Manchu-Qing empire
- Died: 1937 (aged 59–60) Mongolian People's Republic

Tserendondovyn Navaanneren (Mongolian: Цэрэндондовын Навааннэрэн, 1877–1937) was the 20th Khan of the hereditary Setsen Khanate located in the eastern third of modern-day Mongolia. His full title was "Mahasamadi Dalai Setsen Khan". The first Setsen Khan (Wise Khan) was Sholoi Khan (1577–1655) of the Khalkha Mongol, who was a direct descendant of Genghis Khan through Batumongke Dayan Khan of the Northern Yuan (1464–1543).

== Life ==
Navaanneren was born in 1877 as the eldest son of Tserendondov, a grandson of Setsen Khan Artased (reigned 1817–1874). Tserendondov had struggled for the Setsen Khan throne but lost to Demchigdorj. Tserendondov died leaving Navaanneren an orphan to be raised by his uncle. When he was young he studied to become a monk and mastered the Manchu and Chinese languages. He became Setsen Khan in 1910 because the previous Khan Demchigdorj died without a son and he was the next in line (there was an unsuccessful attempt on Navaanneren's life). In this way Navaanneren was thrown into state affairs and left the monastic state. He was described by many as an approachable, kind-hearted man. In 1910 Mongolia was still part of the Manchu Qing dynasty (1644–1911). The Setsen Khan had submitted to the Manchus in 1691 at Dolonnor. While the Manchus recognized the Setsen Khan and left his large territory in Eastern Mongolia intact they were aware that this was a pre-Manchu Khanate and so established numerous banners (Mongolian: khoshuu) inside the Setsen Khan Aimag, giving a great deal of power to the governors (zasag) of the banners while appeasing the Setsen Khans with regular lavish presents and high salary. After 1911 when Mongolia was freed from Manchu rule and the Bogd Khaganate (1911–1919) was established, Navaanneren was given the title "Mahasamadi Dalai Setsen Khan", made Minister of Justice (Shiguhu Yaman-u Sayid), elevated 31 grades, given 20 decorations, a three-eyed peacock feather otgo, green-colored hereditary Royal Coach, yellow vestment and orange reins. He also continued as Setsen Khan for two years under the Constitutional Monarchy period (1921–1924). His queen did not give birth to a son. He divorced his queen and became a monk again in 1922 taking the monastic name Yundenbazar. He was later appointed Minister of the Interior in line with the Mongolian People's Republic's policy of using 'old intellectuals'.

He died during the mass Stalinist purges of 1937.

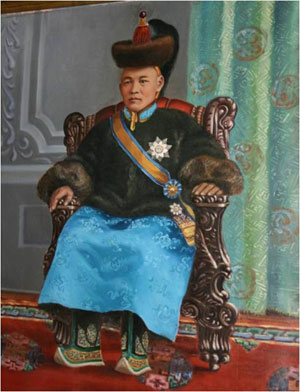
Navaanneren as Minister of Justice during the Bogd Khaganate (1911–1919)

== Ancestry ==
Ancestry of Navaanneren (previous Setsen Khans):

- - Batumongke Dayan Khan (1464–1543), 29th Great Khan and descendant of Genghis Khan (1162–1227) through Kublai Khan.
- - Gersenz Jalair Khuntaij (1513–1549), youngest son of Dayan Khan through Queen Samar Ghailu (also called Jimsgene Khatan).
- - Amindural (1550), fourth son of Gersenz, ruled the northern Kerulen river area.
- - Morbuim Taij, son of Amindural.
- - Khar Zagal (until 1627), son of Morbuim, ruled until 1627.
- 1. Sholoi Khan (1627–1652), son of Morbuim, succeeded his brother Khar Zagal in 1627. First with the title of Setsen Khan.
- 2. Babu (1652–1683), fifth son of Sholoi.
- 3. Norov (1683–1701), third son of Babu.
- 4. Ravdan (1688)
- 5. Omokhei (Sonomdorj), (1701–1709), was only 10 years old in 1701, so was brought up under the tutelage of Namjil Erdene Taij, a grandson of Sholoi.
- 6. Gunchin (1709–1728), eldest son of Omokhei.
- 7. Tsevdenbainjuur (1728–1733), eldest son of Gunchin.
- 8. Choijav (1733–1735), grandson of Norov.
- 9. Damiran (1735–1751), second son of Gunchin.
- 10. Manibadar (1751–1767), eldest son of Damiran.
- 11. Tsevdenjav (1767–1788), second son of Damiran.
- 12. Tseveendorj (1788–1795), eldest son of Tsevdenjav.
- 13. Puntsagdorj (1795), only son of Tseveendorj.
- 14. Sanzaidorj (1796–1800), second generation grandson of Choijav.
- 15. Mahashiri (1800–1807), paternal uncle of Puntsagdorj.
- 16. Enkhtor (1807–1816), son of Mahashiri.
- 17. Artased (1817–1874), son of Enkhtor.
- 18. Tserendorj (1874–1893), son of Artased.
- 19. Demchigdorj (1893–1909), eldest son of Tserendorj.
- 20. Navaanneren (1910–1922), eldest son of Tserendondov, who was the son of Orjinjav the son of Artased.

== Bibliography ==
- "Халхын Махасамади Далай Сэцэн хан". Archived from the original on 2012-03-28.
- "Сэцэн ханы ордон Алтан жаны түүхээс".
- "Сэцэн ханы түүх намтар ил болов".
- Onon, Urgunge; Pritchatt, Derrick (1989). Asia's First Modern Revolution: Mongolia Proclaims its Independence in 1911. Leiden: E.J. Brill. ISBN 90-04-08390-1.
- Sanders, Alan J.K. (2010). Historical Dictionary of Mongolia (3rd ed.). Plymouth: Scarecrow Press. ISBN 978-0-8108-6191-6.
