= Byambyn Rinchen =

Mongolian scholar and writer (1905–1977)

- Born: 21 November 1905; Altanbulag, Selenge province, Mongolia
- Died: 4 March 1977 (aged 71); Ulaanbaatar, Mongolian People's Republic
- Education: Hungarian Academy of Sciences; Leningrad's Institute of Oriental Languages
- Occupations: Author; Translator; Mongolist
- Spouse: Ochiryn Ratna (m. 1931)
- Children: 4, including Rinchen Barsbold

Byambyn Rinchen (Mongolian: Бямбын Ринчен; 21 November 1905 – 4 March 1977), also known as Rinchen Bimbayev (Russian: Ринчен Бимбаев), was a Mongolian scholar and writer. He was a researcher of Mongolia's language, literature, and history, and a recorder and preserver of the country's cultural heritage, publishing many shamanist and folklore texts. Rinchen was also a prolific poet, essayist, short story writer, novelist, and translator, authoring the screenplay for Tsogt taij (1945), Mongolia's first historical feature film, and the trilogy Rays of Dawn (1951–1955, revised 1971), its first novel set during the 1921 revolution. Rinchen was often criticized by the ruling Mongolian People's Revolutionary Party for his "nationalism" and was arrested during the Stalinist purges of the 1930s.

== Biography ==
Byambyn Rinchen (full name Rinchendorj) was born on 21 November 1905 in Mongolian Kyakhta (now Altanbulag, Selenge Province), just across the border from Troitskosavsk (now named Kyakhta) in the Russian Empire. His great-grandfather Bimba, despite being an ethnic Khalkha of the Yüngshiyebü clan, fled zud in Outer Mongolia and enrolled in Russia's Buryat Cossacks, adopting the surname Bimbayev (which Rinchen also used early in his life). Rinchen's mother was a descendant of the famous Khalkha prince Choghtu Khong Tayiji, whose poetry Rinchen later studied. After the 1911 revolution, Rinchen's father, Radnajab (1874–1921), worked as a border official.

Rinchen learned Mongolian and Manchu before attending a Russian school in Kyakhta from 1914 to 1920, and in 1921 was employed as a scribe in the Bogd Khan government's Border Ministry. Between 1923 and 1927, Rinchen studied at Leningrad's Institute of Oriental Languages with Russian Mongolist Boris Vladimirtsov, and after his return worked with Tsyben Zhamtsarano at the Institute of Scriptures and Manuscripts and was director of an Ulaanbaatar middle school. Rinchen joined the leftist "Writers' Circle" in 1929. In 1931, he married Ochiryn Ratna (Maria Ivanovna Oshirov), a Buryat and former wife of arrested Buryat scholar Dashi Sampilon. The couple had three daughters and one son, Rinchen Barsbold, one of Mongolia's leading paleontologists who named the dinosaur genus Rinchenia after his father.

On 10 September 1937, Rinchen was arrested during the Stalinist purges in Mongolia as a "pan-Mongolist Japanese spy" and a counter-revolutionary. He was named as a ringleader by Khorloogiin Choibalsan and sentenced to death in April 1939, but in December 1941 had his sentence reduced to 10 years' imprisonment. On 30 March 1942, he was released at Choibalsan's behest to live under supervision in Ulaanbaatar, where he became literary secretary of the Mongolian People's Revolutionary Party (MPRP) and an editor of the party paper Ünen with Tsendiin Damdinsüren, with whom he often disagreed.

From 1944, Rinchen worked at the Mongolian State University and State Publishing House. In 1947, he translated Karl Marx and Friedrich Engels's The Communist Manifesto into Mongolian. In 1948, he criticized the work of a Soviet adviser at the university, and was first attacked by the MPRP Politburo for his "nationalism" in 1949. He obtained a doctorate in philology in 1956 from the Hungarian Academy of Sciences for his study of Mongolian grammar. In December 1956, Rinchen wrote a letter to Nikita Khrushchev stating that the Cyrillic script was unsuitable for Mongolian; in March 1958, he wrote another to Mao Zedong asking him to not allow introduction of Cyrillic in Inner Mongolia. In 1959, Rinchen organized the First International Congress of Mongolists, the first Mongolian forum to invite scholars from outside the Eastern Bloc. In 1959–1960, the Politburo again accused Rinchen of "bourgeois nationalism", citing Tsogt taij's excessive admiration of feudal characters, Rinchen's poetically-expressed distaste for Russian urban life, and praise for pre-revolutionary cultural achievements as displayed in his 1959 Hungarian travelogue. His work as a theater critic was criticized for neglecting "questions of ideology".

Rinchen was removed as the director of the Institute of Language and Literature, though in 1961 he was a founding member of the Mongolian Academy of Sciences. In 1963, the Supreme Court found him innocent of the charges for which he was imprisoned in 1937–1942. The third volume of his Grammar of Written Mongolian (1967) was recalled and destroyed for expressing nationalism. Another criticism of Rinchen in March 1976 also attacked his parents and brother. These later criticisms were prepared by his academic rivals, such as Shanjmyatavyn Gaadamba. Rinchen died of cancer on 4 March 1977.

== Works ==
Rinchen was a poet, essayist, short story writer, and novelist. His 1944 screenplay for Tsogt taij (1945), Mongolia's first historical feature film, earned him the state Choibalsan Prize. His most famous work is the trilogy Rays of Dawn (Üüriin tuyaa; 1951–1955, revised 1971), Mongolia's first published novel set during the 1921 revolution. It was criticized for its "archaic language" and "too detailed" descriptions of religious ceremonies, facets of pre-revolutionary life which Rinchen hoped to preserve as part of the country's cultural legacy. Lady Anu tells of Galdan Boshugtu Khan's resistance to Qing invaders, while his children's novel Zaan Zaluudai (1966) tells of Stone Age clans. Rinchen's other writings include The Princess (1969), The Great Migration (1972), Amban Sanduo (1973), a four-volume work on the Mongolian language, the collection Epic Poems of Our People, and the Ethnographical and Linguistic Atlas of Mongolia (1976). In poetry, he wrote the anti-clerical "For the Yellow Parasites" (Shira khubalza nartu), and "The Mongol Language", which describes it as "an ornament to the ears". A poem ostensibly about the ʼPhags-pa script criticized the government's abandonment of the traditional Mongolian script.

As a scholar, Rinchen wrote on topics of Mongolian language and literature, and edited works of Mongolia's pre-modern literature. In the 1950s, he sought to publish a bibliography of the purged Zhamtsarano's publications, but was attacked by Mongol and Soviet scholars (one of which called him an "enemy of the people"). He later managed to publish abroad Zhamtsarano's Russian translation of the Khalkha legal code. Rinchen also published shamanist (1959–1975) and folklore (1960–1972) texts, which he had been collecting since 1928; they were criticized for their content and publication in West Germany.

Byambyn Rinchen was one of the key figures who helped shape the early intellectual and cultural links between Mongolia and Czechoslovakia. In the years following the establishment of diplomatic relations, he became an important interlocutor for Czechoslovak scholars travelling to Mongolia, introducing them to Mongolian language, literature, history, customs and cultural traditions.

Rinchen was exceptional also for his knowledge of Czech language; he is described as the first Mongolian to have spoken the language. He visited Czechoslovakia several times and maintained close contacts with Czech and Czechoslovak scholars, including the linguist Pavel Poucha and the archaeologist Lumír Jisl. For them, he was not only a scholarly partner, but also a cultural guide in a country far from their own.

His relationship with Czech culture was not one-sided. Rinchen was deeply interested in Czech history, literature and the Czech National Revival, whose emphasis on language and cultural identity resonated with his own scholarly and literary work. He also helped bring Czech literature to Mongolian readers, translating Julius Fučík’s Reportáž psaná na oprátce into Mongolian as Цаазын газар сурвалжилсан тэмдэглэл in 1951, and Alois Jirásek’s Staré pověsti české as Эртний чех домог тууж, published in Mongolian in two parts in 1965 and 1968.

== Legacy ==
Rinchen was known for his wit and practical jokes, as well as his flowing white hair and beard and the colorful deel (Mongolian gown) which he wore at the university and at conferences. Despite his conflicts with government officials, to the end of his life he believed in the 1921 revolution, and his scholarly work shows admiration of the great Russian tradition of Mongolists. According to his wishes, on his death his coffin was lined not with the Russian-style black or red cloth but with the auspicious Mongolian white, with the outside covered in green and the lid in blue symbolizing heaven over the Mongolian steppe.

In May 2005, to mark the 100th anniversary of his birth, a monument to Rinchen was erected outside of the Mongolian National Library building in central Ulaanbaatar, where he had worked for many years, in a spot previously occupied by a statue of Joseph Stalin.
