= White House of Choghtu Khong Tayiji =

Castle in Dashinchilen, Bulgan, Mongolia

Coordinates: 48°1′24.6″N 104°21′5.9″E

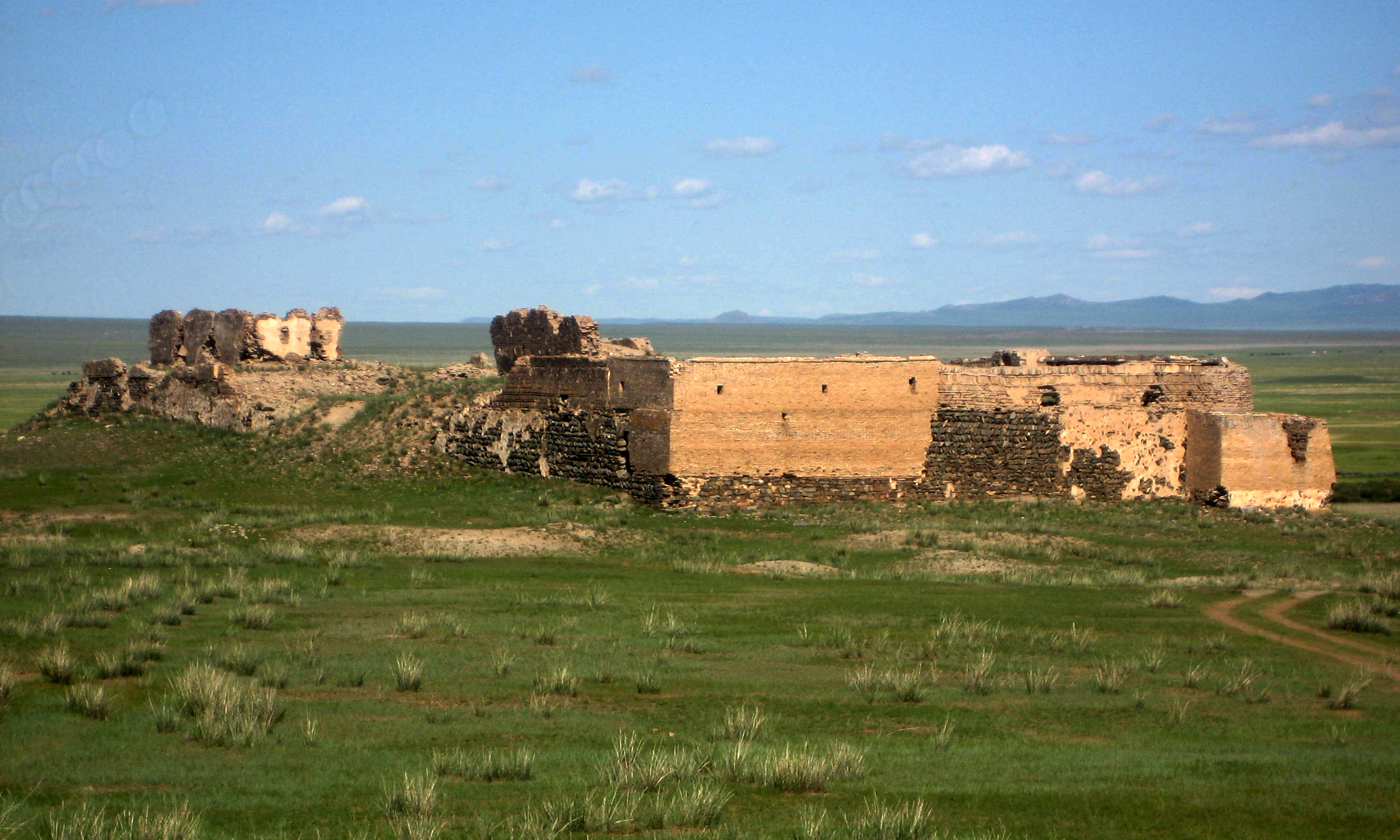
The remains of the castle

The White House of Choghtu Khong Tayiji or White House of Tsogt, also known as the White Castle (Mongolian: Цогтын цагаан байшин, Tsogtyn tsagaan baishin), is a building located in the Dashinchilen sum of Bulgan Aimag, Mongolia. It was built in 1601 by Mongol noble Choghtu Khong Tayiji.

This house was examined by D. A. Klements in 1889. In 1933 and 1934, Soviet archaeologist D. Bukenich made some research around the area and his report is stored in the archives of the Institute of History, at the Science Academy of Mongolia.
