= Udval =

Udval is a Mongolian female name that means Aquilegia. Notable people with the name include:

- Natsagiin Udval (born 1954), Mongolian politician
- Sonomyn Udval (1921–1991) Mongolian politician and writer
- Tsogkhuu Udval (born 1994), Mongolian ju-jitsu practitioner
