= Zasagt Khan =

Former Chingisid Khanate of Khalkha in Mongolia

1820 map showing Zasagt Khan aimag

Zasagt Khan, also spelled Zasagtu Khan or Jasaghtu Khan (Mongolian: ᠵᠠᠰᠠᠭᠲᠤ
ᠬᠠᠨ; Cyrillic: Засагт хан; Chinese: 扎薩克圖汗), refers to the territory as well as the Chingizid dynastic rulers of the Zasagt Khanate. It was one of four Khalka khanates that emerged from remnants of the Mongol Empire after the death of Dayan Khan's son Gersenji Khongtaiji in 1549.

The first ruler of Zasagt tribe was Gersenji's eldest son, Ashikhai. At the beginning of the 17th century, Ashihai's grandson Laihur was awarded the title of "khan" by Abtai Sain Khan. Laihur was murdered in 1587. His son Subadai succeeded and crowned himself the "Bogd Zasagt Khan". Later, Norob, Vanchig, and Tsengüün succeeded to the title of khan.

In 1687, Shar, the Zasagt Khan, was defeated and killed by Tüsheet Khan Chakhundorj. His younger brother Tsevenjab succeeded as the new khan, however, Khalka was invaded by Dzungar Mongolian forces under Galdan Boshugtu Khan in the next year, Tsevenjab had to flee to Ulanqab where he pledged fealty to the Kangxi Emperor of the Qing China. On 3 June 1691, Tsevenjab attended the Dolonnuur Assembly together with Tüsheet Khan, Sechen Khan and more than 500 noyans and taijis. Since then, the Khalkha Mongols in Outer Mongolia submitted to the Qing dynasty. The three khanates, Zasagt Khan, Sechen Khan and Tüsheet Khan, became three provincial subdivisions or aimags of Qing China. In the next year, Khalka was divided into three zams (зам), the area of Zasagt Khan aimag was named "Khalka Right Zam" (Mongolian: Халхын өрнө зам, Chinese: 喀爾喀西路). In 1725, Qing China created a fourth aimag, Sain Noyon. Since 1728, each aimag was governed by aimag congress chigulgan (чуулган) comprising the lords of the khoshuns; the chigulgan daruga (чуулган дарга - official presiding the congress) was appointed from the khoshun lords by the Qing government. the congress of Zasagt khan aimag was called the "Zag golyn ekh Binderiyaa nuuryn chuulgan" (Заг голын эх Биндэръяа нуурын чуулган, 札克畢拉色欽畢都爾諾爾盟), which was held every three years at the source of Zag Gol River (Заг гол).

In 1923, following the Mongolian Revolution of 1921, the Zasagt Khan aimag was renamed Khan Tashir Uulyn aimag (Хан Тайшир уулын аймаг), which named after the Khan Taishir Ridge. In 1930, the four aimags were divided into the present day 21 smaller aimags, which were subdivided into sums.

== Administrative subdivisions of Zasagt Khan aimag ==
- Akhai zasgiin khoshuu
- Mergen zasgiin khoshuu
- Dalai zasgiin khoshuu
- Jalkhanz khutuktu's shabi
- Erdene düüregch zasgiin khoshuu
- Chin achit zasgiin khoshuu
- Tsogtoi zasgiin khoshuu
- Yalguusan khutuktu's shabi
- Setsen zasgiin khoshuu
- Baatar zasgiin khoshuu
- Üizen zasgiin khoshuu
- Erdene zasgiin khoshuu
- Süjigt zasgiin khoshuu
- Darkhan zasgiin khoshuu
- Zasagt khan khoshuu
- Daichin zasgiin khoshuu
- Bigeriin nomun khan khutuktu's shabi
- Ilden zasgiin khoshuu
- Yost zasgiin khoshuu
- Itgemjit zasgiin khoshuu
- Bishrelt zasgiin khoshuu
- Jonon zasgiin khoshuu

== Zasagt Khans ==
1. Laihur (?–1596)
2. Subadai Zasagt Khan (1596–1650), son of Laihur.
3. Norob Bishrelt Khan (1650–1661), son of Subadai.
4. Chu Mergen Zasagt Khan (1661), killed by Erinchin Lobsang Tayiji.
5. Vanchig (1661–1662), eldest son of Norob.
6. Tsengüün (1662–1686), younger brother of Vanchig.
7. Shar (1686–1687), son of Tsengüün.
8. Tsevenjab (1691–1732), younger brother of Shar. 1691–1703 as Prince of the First Rank, 1703–1732 as khan. deposed in 1732
9. Geveenpil (1732–1741)
10. Baldar (1741–1770), son of Geveenpil.
11. Tsevenbalzai (1770–1791), son of Baldar. Retired in 1791.
12. Buniradna (1791–1823), son of Tsevenbalzai.
13. Manibazar (1823–1840), son of Buniradna.
14. Tserendondub (1840–1877), son of Manibazar.
15. Dorjpalam (1877–1898), son of Tserendondub.
16. Sodnomravdan (1898–1912), son of Dorjpalam.
17. Agvaantseren (1912–1915), son of Sodnomravdan.
18. Tserengombozav (1915–1923), son of Dorjpalam.
