= Sechen Khan =

Former Chingisid Khanate of Khalkha Mongols in Mongolia

1820 map showing Sechen Khan aimag

Sechen Khan (Note: Classical Mongolian: ᠰᠡᠴᠡᠨ ᠬᠠᠨ IPA: [sét͡ʃʰeɴ xaɴ]) or Setsen Khan (Note: Mongolian Cyrillic: Сэцэн хан, IPA: [sé̝t͡sʰɪ̆ɴ χaɴ]) refers to the territory as well as the Chingizid dynastic rulers of the Sechen Khanate. It was one of four Khalka khanates that emerged from remnants of the Mongol Empire after the death of Dayan Khan's son Gersenji Khongtaiji in 1549.

The first Sechen Khan Sholoi was a great-grand son of Gersenji Khongtaiji. In the early 1630s, the 5th Dalai Lama bestowed on him the title of "Gegeen Setsen Khan" (Гэгээн сэцэн хан).

In 1688, Ömkhei, the 4th Sechen Khan fled to Xilingol where he pledged fealty to the Kangxi Emperor of the Qing China in return for protection against the invading Dzungar Mongolian forces under Galdan Boshugtu Khan. On 3 June 1691, Ömkhei attended the Dolonnuur Assembly together with Tusheet Khan, Zasagt Khan and more than 500 noyans and taijis. Since then, the Khalkha Mongols in Outer Mongolia submitted to the Qing dynasty. The three khanates, Sechen Khan, Tüsheet Khan and Zasagt Khan, became three provincial subdivisions or aimags of Qing China. In the next year, Khalka was divided into three zams (зам), the area of Sechen Khan aimag was named "Khalka Left Zam" (Mongolian: Халхын зүүн зам, Chinese: 喀爾喀東路). In 1725, Qing China created a fourth aimag, Sain Noyon. Since 1728, each aimag was governed by aimag congress chigulgan (чуулган) comprising the lords of the khoshuns; the chigulgan daruga (чуулган дарга - official presiding the congress) was appointed from the khoshun lords by the Qing government. the congress of Sechen Khan aimag was called the "Kherlen Bars khotod chuulgan" (Хэрлэн Барс хотод чуулган, 克魯倫巴爾和屯盟), which was held every three years in Kherlen Bars.

In 1923, following the Mongolian Revolution of 1921, the Sechen Khan aimag was renamed Khan Khentii Uulyn aimag (Хан Хэнтий уулын аймаг), which named after the Khan Khentii Mountain. In 1930, the four aimags were divided into the present day 21 smaller aimags, which were subdivided into sums.

== Administrative subdivisions of Setsen Khan aimag ==
- Chin achit zasgiin khoshuu
- Akhai zasgiin khoshuu
- Baatar zasgiin khoshuu
- Bishrelt zasgiin khoshuu
- Bishrelt beiliin khoshuu
- Darkhan zasgiin khoshuu
- Dariganga khoshuu
- Daichin zasgiin khoshuu
- Dalai darkhan zasgiin khoshuu
- Dalai zasgiin khoshuu
- Yegüzer khutuktu's shabi
- Yost zasgiin khoshuu
- Jonon zasgiin khoshuu
- Zorigt zasgiin khoshuu
- Ilden zasgiin khoshuu
- Manlai baatar vangiin khoshuu
- Onon golyn shine buriad khoshuu
- Mergen zasgiin khoshuu
- Saruul zasgiin khoshuu
- Süjigt zasgiin khoshuu
- Sergelen zasgiin khoshuu
- Setsen khan khoshuu
- Setsen zasgiin khoshuu
- Üizen zasgiin khoshuu
- Khurts zasgiin khoshuu
- Khuuchid zasgiin khoshuu
- Erdene zasgiin khoshuu
- Erkh zasgiin khoshuu
- Erkhemseg zasgiin khoshuu
- Yalguusan khutuktu's shabi

== Sechen Khans ==
1. Sholoi (c. 1630–1650), son of Möru Buima Noyan; first ruler with the title of Sechen Khan.
2. Babu (1655–1683), fifth son of Sholoi.
3. Norov (1683–1688), third son of Babu.
4. Ilden Ravdan (1688–1690)
5. Ömkhei (1691–1709), grandson of Norov.
6. Günchin (1709–1728), first son of Ömkhei.
7. Tsevdenbanjuur (1728–1733), first son of Günchin.
8. Choizav (1733–1735), grandson of Norov.
9. Damiran (1735–1751), second son of Günchin.
10. Manybadar (1751–1767), first son of Damiran.
11. Tsevdenjav (1767–1788), second son of Damiran.
12. Tseveendorj (1788–1795), first son of Tsevdenjav.
13. Puntsagdorj (1795), second son of Tsevdenjav.
14. Sanzaidorj (1796–1800), first son of Tseveendorj.
15. Mahashiri (1800–1807)
16. Enkhtör (1807–1817), first son of Mahashiri.
17. Artased (1817–1875), son of Enkhtör.
18. Tserendorj (1875–1893), son of Artased.
19. Demchigdorj (1893–1909), son of Tserendorj.
20. Navaanneren (1910–1923), eldest son of Tserendondov, who was the son of Orjinjav the son of Artased.

== chigulgan daruga ==
1. Tsevdenbanjuur (1728-1733), Sechen khan
2. Choizav (1733-1736), Sechen khan
3. Damiran (1736–1750), Sechen khan
4. Demchig (1750-1753), Ilden jün van
5. Manybadar (1753–1767), Sechen khan
6. Bazarsad (1767-1768), Jasagh van
7. Tsevdenjav (1768–1782), Sechen khan
8. Gonchigjav (1782–1790), Jasagh Darkhan van
9. Sanzaidorj (1790-1800), Ilden jün van
10. Beil Dagdandorj (1800-1802), Sechen van
11. Gombojav (1802-1805), Jonon jasagh
12. Mahashiri (1806–1807), Sechen khan
13. Daramshir (1807-1813), Darkhan van
14. Enkhtör (1813-1817), Sechen khan
15. Artased (1817–1830), Sechen khan
16. Tserendorj (1830-1846), Darkhan van
17. Gonchigjav (1846-1856), Sechen van
18. Dejiddorj (1856-1857), beis
19. Togtokh-tör (1857-1868), Ilden jün van
20. Erdene-togtool (1868-1875), gün
21. Manjbazar (1875-1882), Ilden van
22. Tserendorj (1882-1892), Sechen khan
23. Namjildendev (1892), Jasagh van
24. Tserensandüi (1893), Sechen van
25. Demchigdorj (1896), Sechen khan
26. Dorjpalam (1897-1910), Ilden van
27. Gombosüren (1910-1914), beis
28. Tsogbadrakh (1915-1919), Jonon van
29. Navaanneren (1920-1921), Erdene dalai van
