= Great Destiny =

1973 novel by Sonomyn Udval

Great Destiny is a 1973 historical novel by Mongolian author Sonomyn Udval. The novel relates the story of Commander Khatanbaatar Magsarjab and his pathway through revolution.
