= Tsogt taij (film) =

- Directed by: Yuri Tarich
- Written by: Yuri Tarich; Byambyn Rinchen
- Produced by: M.Bold, M.Luvsanjamts
- Starring: Tsagaany Tsegmid; Ayuuryn Tserendendev; Danzangiin Bat-Ochir; Buuchiin Jigmeddorj
- Cinematography: Dejidiin Jigjid
- Music by: Bilegiin Damdinsüren; Luvsanjamgiin Mördorj; Boris Smirnov
- Production company: Mongolkino
- Release date: 1945
- Running time: 152 minutes
- Country: Mongolia
- Language: Mongolian
- Budget: 2,400,000 tugrik

Tsogt taij (Mongolian: Цогт тайж, ᠴᠣᠭᠲᠤ ᠲᠠᠶᠢᠵᠢ, romanized: Čoɣto tayiji), released in the Soviet Union as Knights of the Steppes (Russian: Степные витязи, romanized: Stepnye vityazi), is a 1945 film by Russian director Yuri Tarich. Written by Tarich and Mongolian linguist Byambyn Rinchen, the film tells the story of Choghtu Khong Tayiji.

== Literature ==
- Petr Rollberg. Historical Dictionary of Russian and Soviet Cinema. United Kingdom 2008, 2nd edition. Page: 728.
- BARNETT, ROBERT. “‘Tsogt Taij’ and the Disappearance of the Overlord: Triangular Relations in Three Inner Asian Films.” Inner Asia, vol. 9, no. 1, 2007, pp. 41–75, http://www.jstor.org/stable/23615067. Accessed 15 May 2022.
- Manduhai Buyandelger. Tricky Representations: Buddhism in the Cinema during Socialism in Mongolia. In: Silk Road. Summer 2008, Vol. 6.1; Pages: 54–62.
