= Odgerel =

1957 novel by Sonomyn Udval

Odgerel ('Starlight') is a 1957 novel by Mongolian author Sonomyn Udval. The novel relates the story of the hardship of a Gobi woman during her course of life.
