= Abtai Sain Khan =

- Khan of Tüsheet
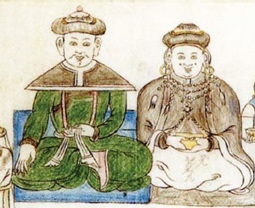
- Abtai Sain Khan and his queen
- Reign: 1544–1588
- Coronation: 1587
- Predecessor: Onokhui Üizen Noyan (Mongol Prince)
- Successor: Erkhi Mergen Khan
- Born: 1554
- Died: 1588 (aged 33–34)
- Burial: Erdene Zuu Monastery of Kharkhorum
- Issue: Shubuudai, Erkhi
Names
- Abtai Sain Khan (ᠠᠪᠲᠠᠢ ᠰᠠᠢᠨ ᠬᠠᠭᠠᠨ; Абтай сайн хан)
- House: Borjigin
- Dynasty: Tüsheet Khan
- Father: Onokhui Üizen Noyan (Mongol Prince)
- Religion: Tibetan Buddhism

Abtai Sain Khan (Mongolian: ᠠᠪᠲᠠᠶ ᠰᠠᠢᠨ ᠬᠠᠭᠠᠨ Абтай сайн хан; 1554–1588) – alternately Abatai or Avtai (Mongolian: Автай хан, meaning who have the gift of witchcraft (Автай) and good (сайн) – was a Khalkha-Mongolian prince who was named by the 3rd Dalai Lama as first khan of the Tüsheet Khanate in 1587. He zealously propagated Tibetan Buddhism among the Khalkha Mongols and founded the Buddhist monastery of Erdene Zuu in 1585.

Abtai was born in 1554 to the Khalkha Mongol prince Onokhui üizen Noyan (b. 1534). He was the eldest among Onokhui üizen Noyan's five sons which include Abugho, Tarni, Tumengken, and Barai. He was the great-grandson of Dayan Khan(1464–1517) and grandson of Gersenji Khuntaij(1513–1549). Blood smeared on his fingers at birth presaged a great warrior and from 1567 to 1580 Abtai led several campaigns against western Oirat Mongol tribes, finally defeating the Oirats' Khoshut tribe at Köbkör Keriye in the mid-1580s. Abtai then placed his son Shubuudai on the Oirat throne. His ferociousness in battle earned him the moniker The Mad Hero or the Mad Taiji of North Khalkha.

Around 1580, Abtai learned that his uncle Altan Khan (1507–1583) of the Tumeds had converted to Gelupga (Yellow Hat) Tibetan Buddhism. Abtai invited the lama Shiregetü Güüshi Chorjiwa from Altan's Inner Mongolian city Guihua (present day Hohhot) to teach him the basic tenets of Tibetan Buddhism. Abtai then ordered construction of the Erdene Zuu monastery in 1585. Stones from the nearby ruins of the ancient Mongol capital of Karakorum were used in its construction and the monastery was populated with images and relics Abtai had received from the Dalai Lama.

In 1587, Abtai traveled to Guihua to meet with Sonam Gyatso, the 3rd Dalai Lama, who had traveled there from Lhasa to offer prayers for Altan Khan, who had died in 1583. Upon Abtai's return, he banned shamanism and declared Tibetan Buddhism to be the state religion of Khalkha Mongols.

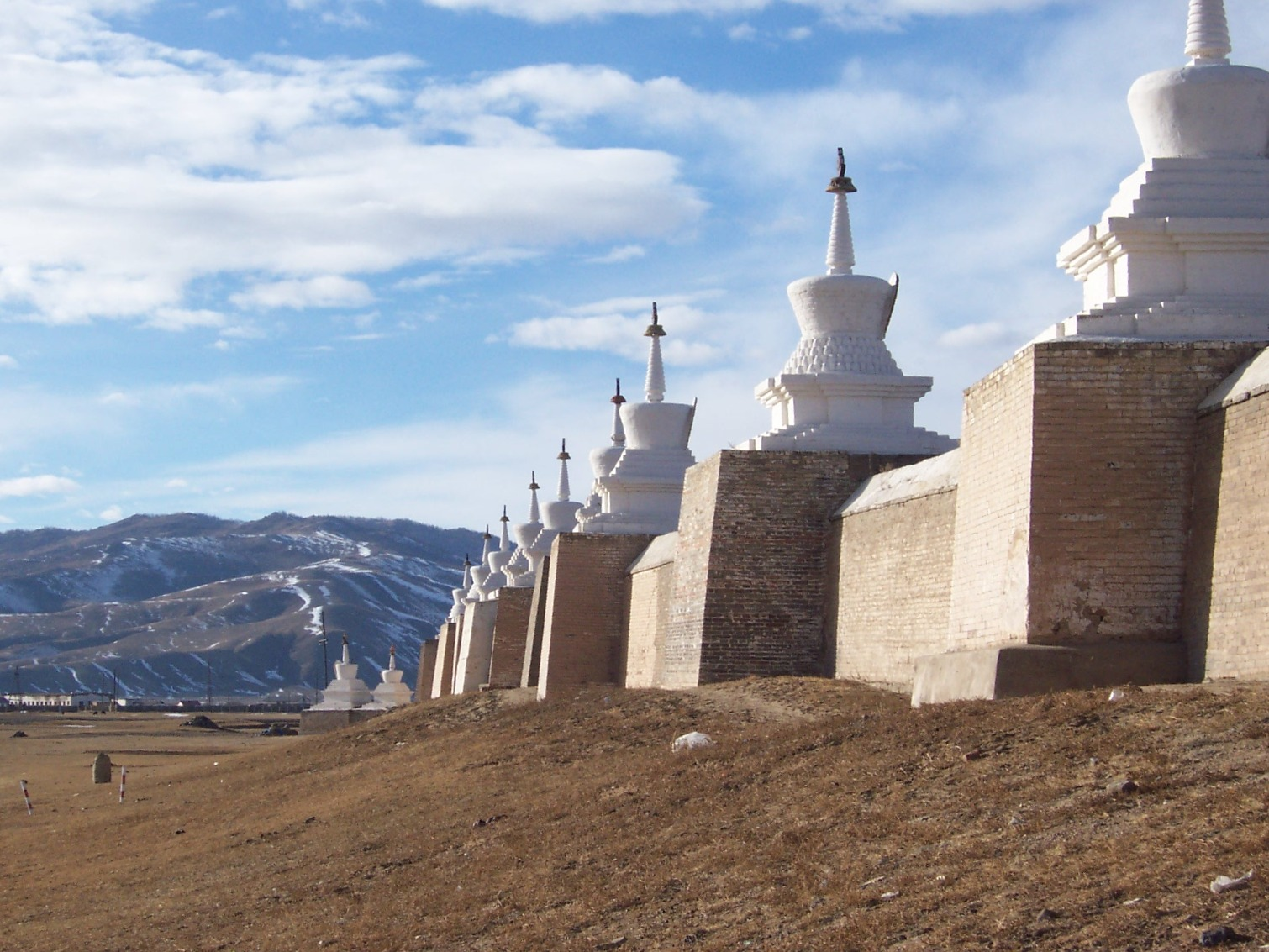
Stupas surrounding Erdene Zuu monastery

Abtai died a year later in 1588. His remains were interred at Erdene Zuu. Shortly thereafter his son Shubuudai was killed by Oirat chieftains. Abtai's descendants would continue to reign over the house of the Tüsheet Khan. Abtai's great-grandson Zanabazar (born Eshidorji) was recognized by the 5th Dalai Lama as the first Jebtsundamba Khutuktu and Bogd Gegeen or spiritual leader of Tibetan Buddhism in Khalkha Mongolia in the 1640s.

In pre-revolutionary Mongolia a special cult devoted to Abtai Khan flourished. He was celebrated as the last ruler who tried to unite Mongolia after the collapse of the Yuan Dynasty and who introduced Buddhism to Mongolia.
