= Mongolyn Ünen =

Newspaper of the Mongolian People's Party

Mongolyn Ünen Монголын Үнэн ᠮᠣᠩᠭᠣᠯ ᠤ᠋ᠨ ᠦᠨᠡᠨ
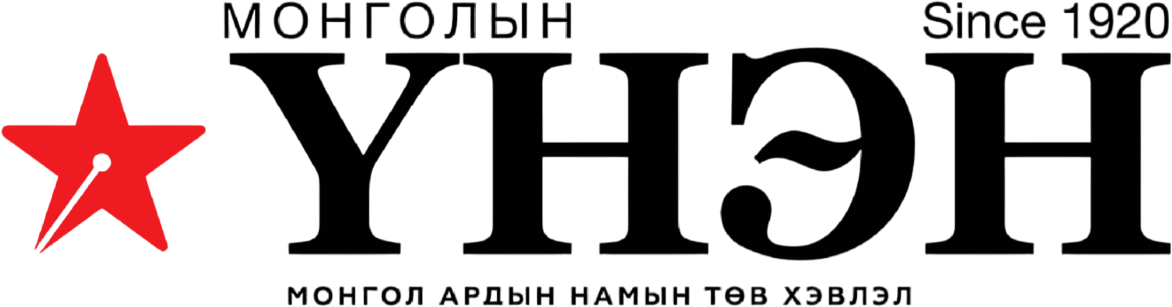

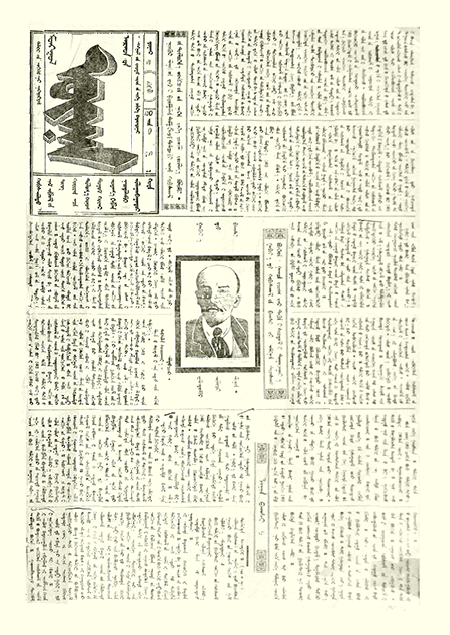
- First issue, 18 January 1920
- Type: Daily newspaper
- Format: Broadsheet
- Owner: Mongolian People's Party
- Founded: 1920
- Political alignment: Social democracy (Note: 1920–1990: Communism; Marxism–Leninism; 1928–1956: Stalinism; 1990–2010: Democratic socialism)
- Language: Mongolian
- Headquarters: Prime Minister Anandyn Amar Street, Sükhbaatar District, Ulaanbaatar
- Country: Bogd Khanate of Mongolia (1920–1924); Mongolian People's Republic (1924–1992); Mongolia (since 1992)
- Website: unenmedee.mn

Mongolyn Ünen (Note: Mongolian: Монголын Үнэн, pronounced [mɔɴɢəɮíːɴ únəɴ]; lit. 'Mongolian Truth') is a Mongolian daily newspaper and the central organ of the Mongolian People's Party. Named after the Russian Pravda newspaper, it was founded and first published in 1920. During the socialist period, it was the main print media, with a circulation of 145,000.

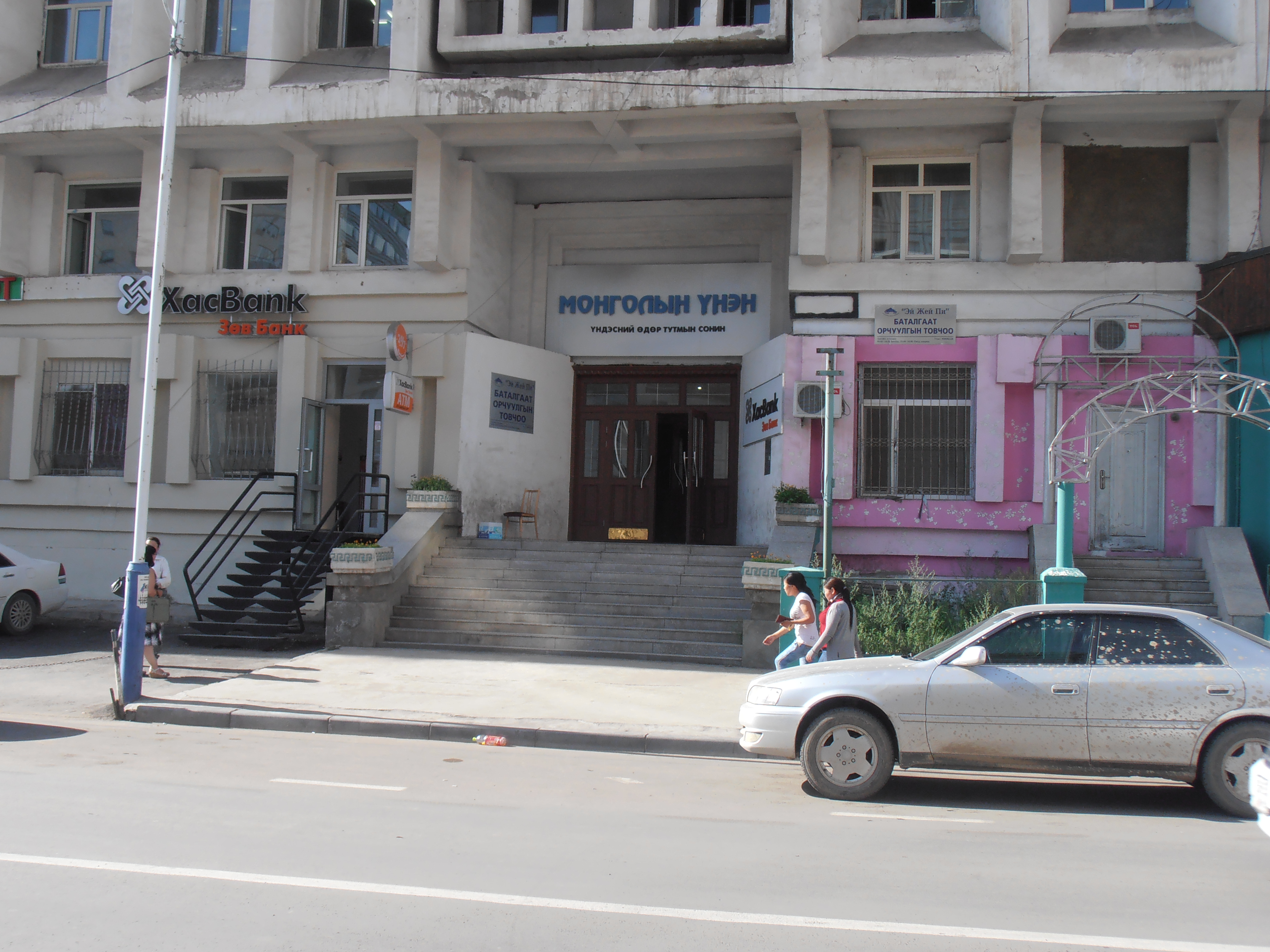
The editorial building in Ulaanbaatar, in 2013.

In 1921 and 1922, the newspaper was known as Uria. (Note: Mongolian: Уриа [ʊrʲɛ́]; lit. 'Summon') In 1925, it was renamed Ünen. (Note: Mongolian: Үнэн [únəɴ]; lit. 'Truth') In 1923 and from 1990 (post-Revolution) to 2010, the newspaper was named Ardyn Erkh. (Note: Mongolian: Ардын эрх [artíːɴ e̝rx]; lit. 'People's Right')
