= Khalkha Mongols =

Largest subgroup of Mongol people

Khalkha
- Territories of the Khalkha Mongols in 1911, including the Mongolian aimags (red) and the Khalkha banners in Inner Mongolia and Qinghai (yellow), 1911

Regions with significant populations
- Mongolia: 2,659,985 (2020)

Languages
- Khalkha Mongolian

Religion
- Predominantly: Buddhism (92.7%); Minority: Mongolian Shamanism (4.0%); Christianity (2.3%)

Related ethnic groups
- Other Mongol groups (Buryats, Khotgoid, Oirats)

The Khalkha (/ˈkælkə, ˈkɑːlkə/; Mongolian: Халх ᠬᠠᠯᠬ᠎ᠠ [ˈχa̠ɬχ]) have been the largest subgroup of the Mongols in what is now Mongolia since the 15th century. The Khalkha, together with Chahars, Ordos and Tumed, were directly ruled by Borjigin khans until the 20th century.

In contrast, the Oirats were ruled by Dzungar nobles and the Khorchins were ruled by Qasar's descendants, and they speak distinct varieties: Oirat and Khorchin.

The two original major Khalkha groups were ruled by the direct male line descendants of Dayan Khan. The Baarin, Khongirad, Jaruud, Bayaud and the O'zeed (Ujeed) became the subjects of Dayan Khan's fifth son Achibolod. They formed the Southern Five Khalkhs.

Seven northern Khalkha otogs: 1) Jalairs, Olkhonud; 2) Besut, Eljigin; 3) Gorlos, Keregut; 4) Khuree, Khoroo, Tsookhor; 5) Khukhuid, Katagans; 6) Tanghut, Sartuul; and 7) Uriankhai became subjects of Dayan Khan's youngest (could be third) son Gersenji prince (Mongolian: Гэрсэнз Жалайр Хан). Khotogoids are close in culture and language to the Khalkha Mongols.

There were also numerous direct descendants of Genghis Khan who had formed the ruling class of the Khalkha Mongols prior to the 20th century, but they were, and still are, regarded as Khalkha Mongols rather than members of a special unit.

The Thirteen Khalkhas of the Far North are the major subethnic group of the independent state of Mongolia. They number 2,659,985 (83.8% of Mongolia's population).

== Etymology ==
The Khalkhas and contemporary Asian polities c. 1700

The term Халх, transliterated as Halh or Khalkha, has always puzzled linguists and historians. One possible interpretation is that it shares the same root as the words xалхавч "shield" and халхлах "to protect; to cover; to shield; to hide; to intercept", although there is no noun or verb "xалх" that exists independently besides the ethnic group's name. In a similar manner, the sub-ethnic groups within the Khalkha Unit have been historically recorded in books, journals, and documents as "Sartuul Khalkha", "Tanghut Khalkha", etc. Even the word order in the phrases Southern Five Khalkha and Northern Thirteen Khalkha implies that the word Халх correlates to the units within the Southern and Northern tribal federations, but it does not stand for the group as a whole. Lastly, Mongolians have always linked the term Халх to the name of the Khalkhin Gol, a river in Mongolia, Inner Mongolia, and northeastern China.

== History ==
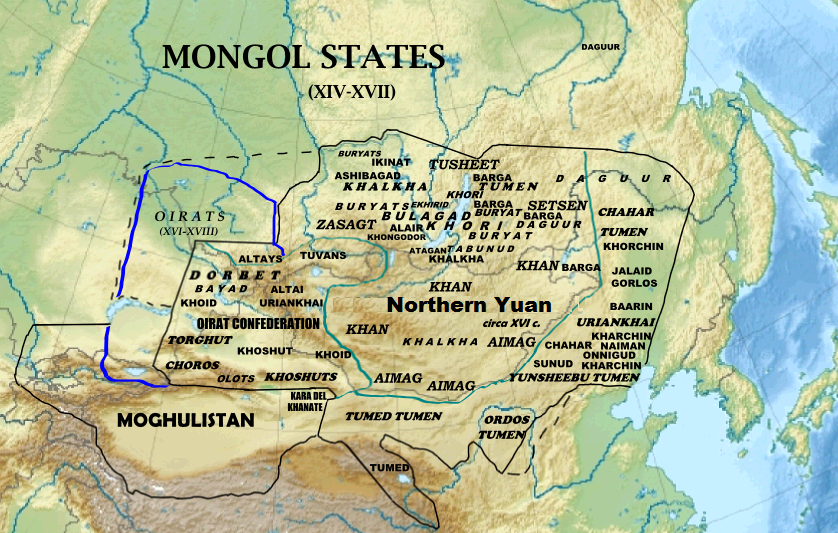
Territory of the Khalkha Mongols during the early Northern Yuan period

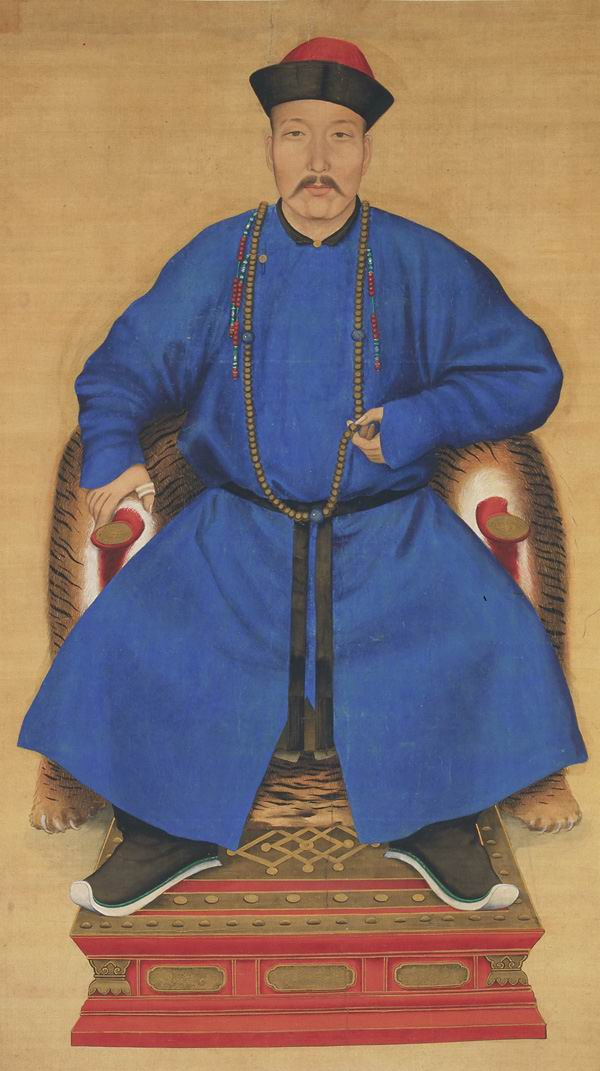
Khalkha Borjigin ruler Tsereng (博爾濟吉特策凌, 1672-1750). 18th century painting

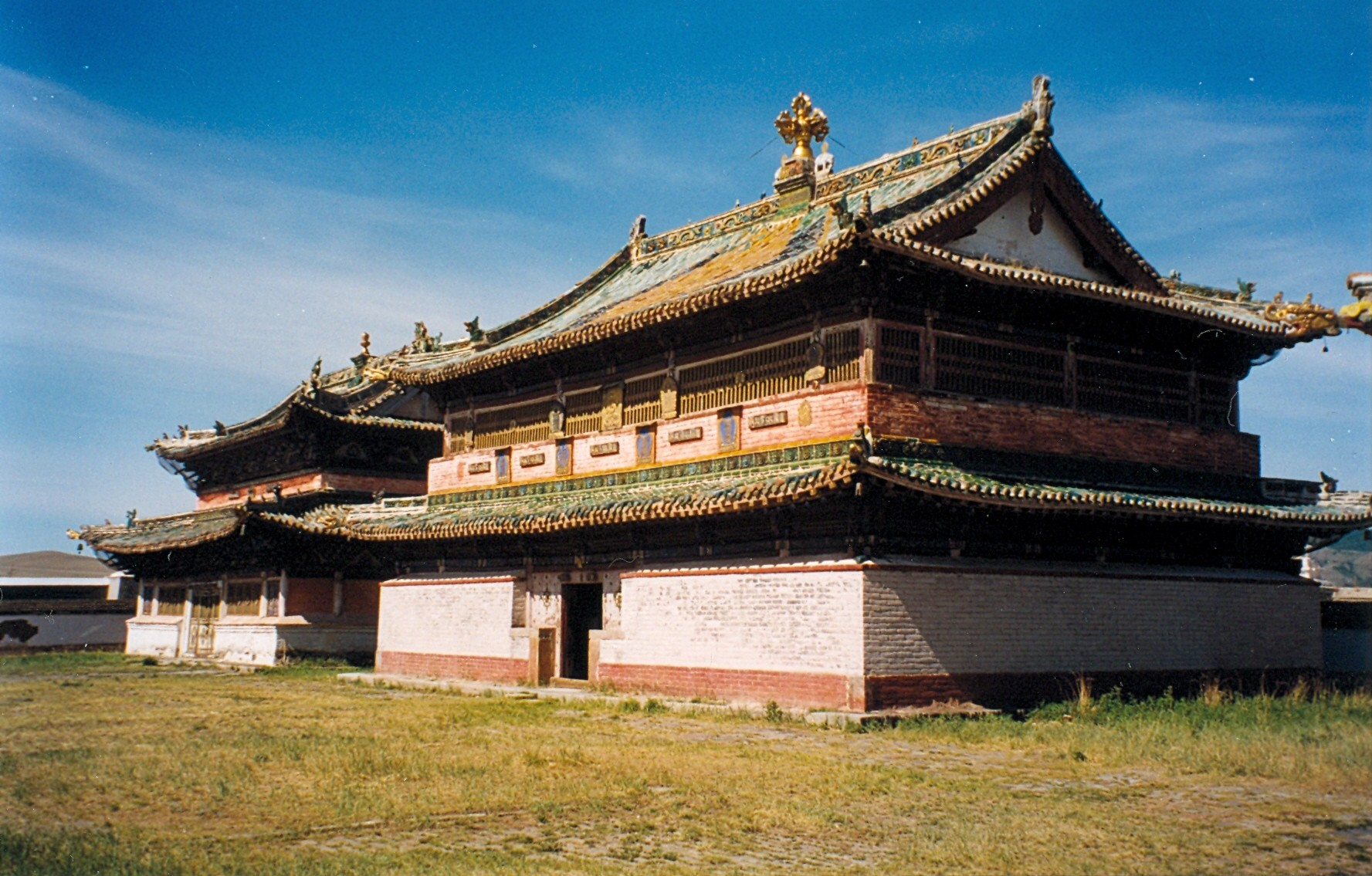
The Erdene Zuu Monastery was established in the 16th century by Abtai Sain Khan in the heartland of the Khalkha territory

Dayan Khan created the Khalkha Tumen out of Mongols residing in the territory of present-day central Mongolia and northern part of Inner Mongolia. In Mongolian historical sources such as Erdeniin Erih ("The Beads of Jewel") it clearly stated how the Khalkha Tumen was created and where these people resided at the time of its creation. The statement goes as follows:

- Cyrillic:

Хангай ханд нутаглан сууж
Харь дайсанд чинь халх болсон
Халуун аминд чинь түшээ болсон
Ирэхийн үзүүр, харахын харуул болсон
Халх түмэн чинь тэр бүхий бээр ажаамуу

- Transliteration:

Khangai khand nutaglan suuj
Khari daisand chini khalkh bolson
Khaluun amind chini tüshee bolson
Irehiin üzüür, kharakhiin kharuul bolson
Khalkh tümen chini ter bühii beer ajaamuu

- Mongolian script

ᠬᠠᠩᠭᠠᠢ ᠬᠠᠨ ᠳᠤ ᠨᠤᠲᠤᠭᠯᠠᠨ ᠰᠠᠭᠤᠵᠤᠬᠠᠷᠢ ᠳᠠᠶᠢᠰᠤᠨ ᠳᠤ ᠴᠢᠨᠢ ᠬᠠᠯᠬ᠎ᠠ ᠪᠣᠯᠤᠭᠰᠠᠨᠬᠠᠯᠠᠭᠤᠨ ᠠᠮᠢᠨ ᠳᠤ ᠴᠢᠨᠢ ᠲᠦᠰᠢᠶ᠎ᠡ ᠪᠣᠯᠤᠭᠰᠠᠨᠢᠷᠡᠬᠦ ᠶᠢᠨ ᠦᠵᠦᠭᠦᠷ᠂ ᠬᠠᠷᠠᠬᠤ ᠶᠢᠨ ᠬᠠᠷᠠᠭᠤᠯ ᠪᠣᠯᠤᠭᠰᠠᠨᠬᠠᠯᠬ᠎ᠠ ᠲᠦᠮᠡᠨ ᠴᠢᠨᠢ ᠲᠡᠷᠡ ᠪᠦᠬᠦᠢ ᠪᠡᠷ᠎ ᠠᠵᠢᠶᠠᠮᠤ

- Transliteration:

Qangɣai khan-du nutuɣlan saɣuju
Qari daiisun-du čini qalqa boluɣsan
Qalaɣun amin-du čini tüshiye boluɣsan
Irehu-yin üjügür, qaraqu-yin qaraɣul boluɣsan
Qalqa tümen čini tere bühüi ber ajiyamu

- English translation:

"Dwelling in the Khangai Mountains" (Central Mongolian Mountain range called Khangai Mountain Range, near which Kharakhorum, the ancient capital, was built)
"A shield (in Mongolian, khalkha means "shield" or "protection") against alien enemies"
"A support for your precious life"
"A blade towards those who come, a guard towards those who look"
"Your Khalkha Tumen is indeed for you"

It is also believed that the Southern Khalkha who now reside in Inner Mongolia were moved south from its original territory Khangai Mountains. To commemorate and signify their origin, every new lunar year all southern Khalkhas perform special Khangai Mountain worshipping ceremonies and they face northwest and pray. This special ceremony is maintained by only southern Khalkhas and no other Southern Mongols have such rituals.

Under Dayan Khan, the Khalkha were organized as one of three tümen of the Left Wing. Dayan Khan installed the fifth son Alchu Bolad and the eleventh son Geresenje on the Khalkha. The former became the founder of the Five Halh of Southern Mongolia and the latter became the founder of the Seven Halh of the Northern Mongolia. They were called Inner Khalkha and Outer Khalkha respectively, by the Manchus.

Some scholars consider that the Khalkha had a close connection with the Five Ulus of the Left Wing of the former Yuan dynasty, which was led by the five powerful tribes of Jalayir, Onggirat, Ikires, Uruud and Mangghud.

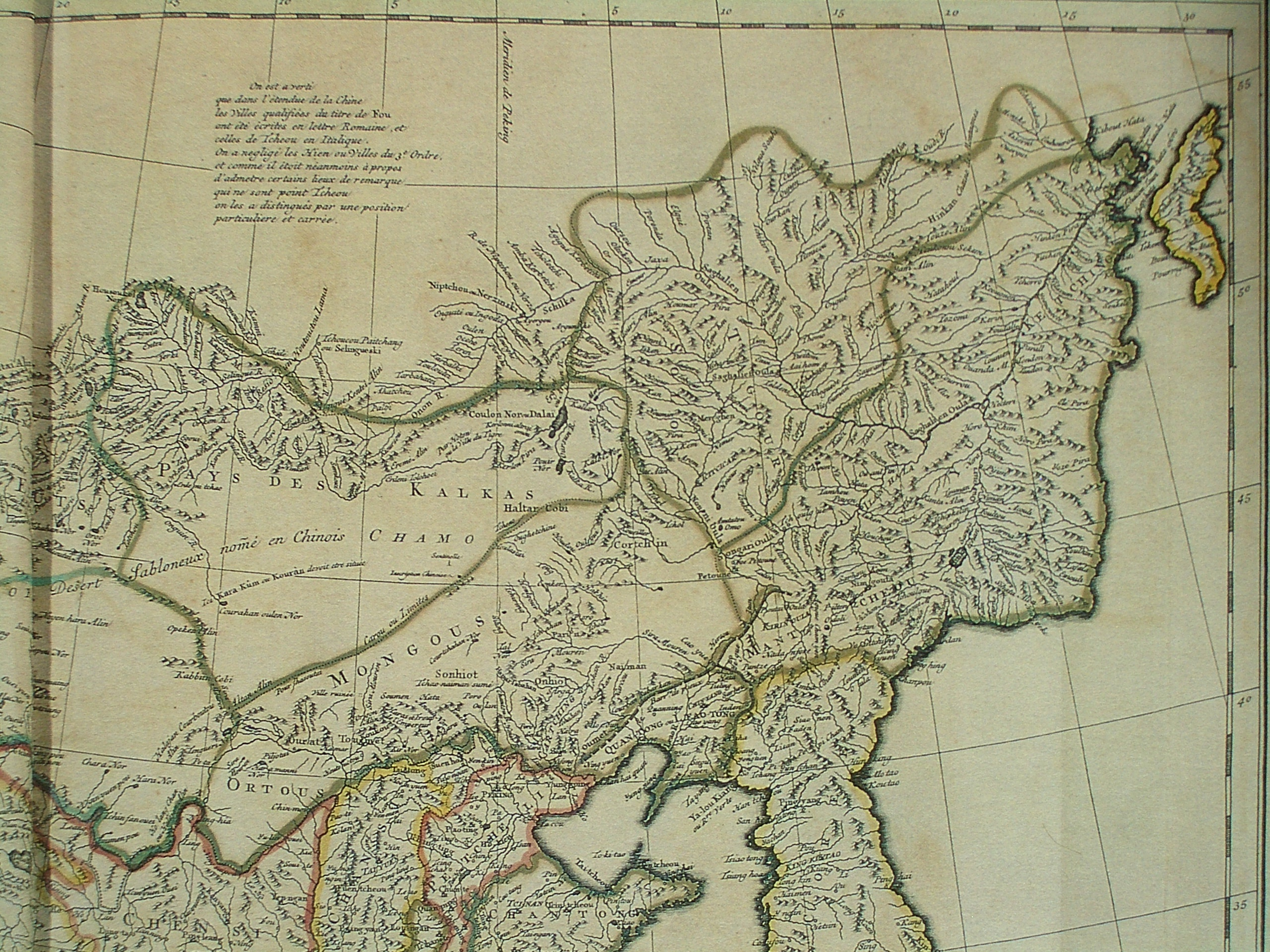
"The Country of the Khalkha" (Pays des Kalkas) on a 1734 map by d'Anville, based on Jesuits' fieldwork ca. 1700

The Five Halh consisted of five tribes called Jarud, Baarin, Onggirat, Bayaud and Öjiyed. They lived around the Shira Mören valley east of the Greater Khingan. They clashed with but were eventually conquered by the rising Manchus. The Five Khalkha except for the Jarud and the Baarin were organized into the Eight Banners. Khalkha Left Banner of Juu Uda League and Khalkha Right Banner of Ulaanchab League were offshoots of the Seven Khalkha.

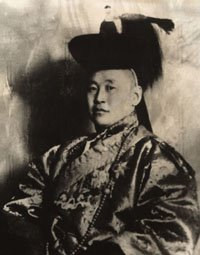
Tögs-Ochiryn Namnansüren the Sain Noyon Khan of Khalkha Mongol, a leader of the National Liberation Movement of 1911

The Seven Khalkha were involved in regular fights against the Oyirad in the west. Geresenje's descendants formed the houses of Tüsheet Khan, Zasagt Khan and Setsen Khan. They preserved their independence until they had to seek help from the Kangxi Emperor of the Manchu-led Qing dynasty against the Zungar leader Galdan Khan in 1688. In 1725 the Yongzheng Emperor gave Tsering independence from the house of Tüsheet Khan, forming the house of Sain Noyon Khan.

The Khalkha led the Mongolian independence movement in the 20th century. After enduring countless hardships, they established the independent state of Mongolia in northern Mongolia.

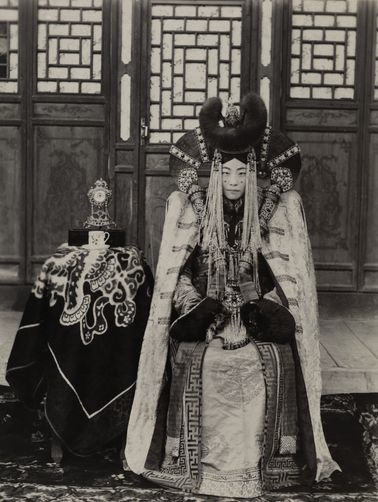
Image of a Mongolian nobility lady (incorrectly identified as Genepil, Queen consort of Mongolia)

== Khalkha diaspora ==
The overwhelming majority of Khalkha Mongols now reside in the modern state of Mongolia. However, there are four small banners in China: two in Inner Mongolia; one in Qinghai; and one in Rehe. There are also several groups among the Buriats in Russia, however, they no longer retain the Khalkha self-identity, culture, and language. The Halh Mongols in Qinghai, China and the ones among the Buryats in Russia were subjects to Khalkha's Tsogtu Khan and his sons.

The Choghtu Khong Tayiji's Khalkhas (1 banner): Poet, supporter of Ligdan Khan, and opponent of the Dalai Lama's "Yellow Hat" order, Tsogtu Khong Taiji moved to Qinghai with his subjects sometime after 1624. Ligdan Khan and Tsogtu Khong Taiji were supposed to meet in Qinghai and eventually build a Mongol base that is independent of the Manchu rule which was geographically far from the Manchu emperor's reach. Moreover, it was clear to the two Mongol Khans that Tibetan Dalai Lama's influence in Mongol affairs was increasing. So the two decided to end the influence of Dalai Lama and the "Yellow Hat" order by supporting the "Red Hat" order. However, majority of Ligdan Khan's subjects and soldiers died because of smallpox on the way to Qinghai. After Ligdan's death, Tsogtu Taiji began attacking dGe-lugs-pa monasteries. When Tsogtu sent 10,000 men under his son Arslang against the Dalai Lama in Lhasa, Arslang switched sides and supported the Dalai Lama. The dGe-lugs-pa hierarch, the Fifth Dalai Lama (1617–82), summoned the Oirat Güshi Khan Toro-Baiku, whose 10,000 men in early 1637 crushed Tsogtu’s 30,000 at Ulaan-Khoshuu; Tsogtu Taiji was killed. Today the Oirats of Gushi Khan is also known as the "Upper Mongols" or the "ДЭЭД МОНГОЛ", and they still reside in Qinghai forming 21 banners. The remnants of Tsogtu Khong Taiji's Halhs form only one banner and are known as the "Lower Mongols" or "ДООД МОНГОЛ". Tsogtu Khong Taiji is known as Tsogtu Khan among the Khalkha Mongols in Qinghai.

The Khalkha Right Wing Banner: This banner was popularly known as the Darkhan Beili Banner and the ruler of this banner was the descendant of Gersenz Jalair Khan's grandson Bunidari. In 1653 they migrated into Inner Mongolia from the Tusheet Khan Aimak of Outer Mongolia.

The Khalkha East Wing Banner: This banner was popularly known as the "Chokhor Halh" and the ruler of this banner was the descendant of Gombo-Ilden, the fifth generation grandson to Gersenz Jalair Khan. They fled from the Zasakto Khan Aimak of Outer Mongolia to Inner Mongolia in 1664. Its boundaries as given by the Mongol Pastures run 125 by 230 "li", or about 66 by 122 kilometres (41 by 76 miles).

The Tanggot Khalkha Banner: This Banner formerly subordinated for administrative purposes to the East Wing Tumet (Monggoljin) Banner, is popularly known as Tanggot Khalkha. This tiny territory, of not more than 19 by 24 kilometres (12 by 15 miles), is said to have a population of about 500 people. There are practically no Chinese, as the surrounding districts are held by Mongols. The tribe, which has a prince of its own, was founded by immigrants from the Jasakto Khan division of Outer Mongolia, who fled to Inner Mongolia and offered submission to the Manchus in 1662, during the wars between the Northern (Khalkha) and Western (Ulot) Mongols.

== Loss of Khalkha territory to Imperial Russia and the Buriatized Khalkhas ==
During the rise of Genghis Khan in the 12th to 13th centuries, neither the Selenge valley in today's southern Buriatia or the Aga steppe had at this time any connection with the Buriats; these were the lands of the Merkid tribe and the Mongol tribe proper. Starting 1628 with the Russian Conquest and Buriat Migration, the Selenge Valley, as before, was inhabited by Mongol clans under the rule of the Khalkha khans. By 1652 the Khalkha khans were protesting the Russian incursions into Transbaikalia, and from 1666 on Khalkha raiding parties reached as far as Bratsk, Ilimsk, Yeravninsk, and Nerchinsk, while the khans besieged the forts on the Selenge. At the same time, however, the Khoris along the Uda River in 1647 surrendered as a block to the Russians to escape paying tribute to the Khalkhas. Smaller Mongol clan fragments also defected north to the protection of Cossack forts. The invasion of Khalkha by the Dzungar Khan Galdan Boshogtu in 1688 stopped Khalkha resistance to the Cossack advance and sent more Mongol refugees fleeing into Russian control.

Finally, the Selenge Mongols, cut off by the new border from their Khalkha kinsmen and mixed with displaced Buriats and Khori, gradually accepted the Russian designation as Buriat. These groups are: Descendants of Okhin Taij (grandson of Khalkha's Tsogtu Khan); Khatagin; Atagan; Ashabagad; Sartuul; Tavnanguud; Yungsiebu; O'zeed; Uuld; Tsongool. The Tsongool subclans are as follows: 1. Uriankhad, 2. Bolingud, 3. Baatud, 4. Ashibagad, 5. Avgachuud, 6. Sharnuud, 7. Nomkhod, 8. Khamnigan, 9. Arshaantan, 10. Khorchid, 11. Naimantan, 12. Yunshööbü, 13. Khotgoid, 14. Eljiged, 15. Örlüüd, 16. Tavnanguud, 17. Orongoi, 18. Tsookhor, 19. Sartuul, 20. Sharaid, 21. Temdegten.

Mongolian academician, writer, and scholar Byambyn Renchin (Mongolian: Бямбын Ренчин) is a representative of this ethnic group. His father belonged to the Yungshiebu tribe and his mother was a direct descendant of Genghis Khan through Khalkha's Tsogtu Khan.
