= Sonomyn Udval =

Mongolian politician (1921–1991)

- Сономын Удвал
- Born: 21 February 1921; Dashinchilen
- Died: 1991 (aged 69–70)

Sonomyn Udval (Mongolian: Сономын Удвал; 21 February 1921 – 1991) was a Mongolian women's leader, politician and writer.

== Biography ==
She was born in Dashinchilen sum of Bulgan Province on 21 February 1921. She worked as the chairwoman of the Central Council of the Mongolian Trade Union in 1956–1958; the first secretary and then the chair of the Mongolian Writers' Union, the chairwoman and president of the Mongolian Women's Committee in 1973–1982 and the deputy chairwoman of the Committee of Veterans of Revolutionary Struggle. In 1953, she was elected to serve on the Executive Council of the Women's International Democratic Federation. Udwal was elected as the deputy of the People's Great Khural (Parliament) in various constituencies between 1951 and 1986. In 1966 she joined the Mongolian People's Revolutionary Party's Central Committee and left it in 1990.

As a writer, Udwal penned novels such as Odgerel (1957), The First Thirteen, Khatanbaatar, Tuuž ögüüllėg (1974) Magsarjav, and Great Destiny (1973), and numerous short stories. Her works have been translated into several languages. Described as a "prominent short story writer", she was awarded with the Joliot-Curie Gold Medal of Peace of the World Council of Peace in 1965 and the Afro-Asian Lotus Prize for Literature in 1971, awarded by the Permanent Bureau of Afro-Asian Writers. She noted in 1967 that Soviet literature played an important role in the development of Mongolian literature.
