= Dashinchilen =

District in Bulgan Province, Mongolia

Coordinates: 47°51′00″N 104°02′36″E

Dashinchilen District Дашинчилэн сум ᠳᠠᠰᠢᠨᠴᠢᠯᠢᠩᠰᠤᠮᠤ
- District
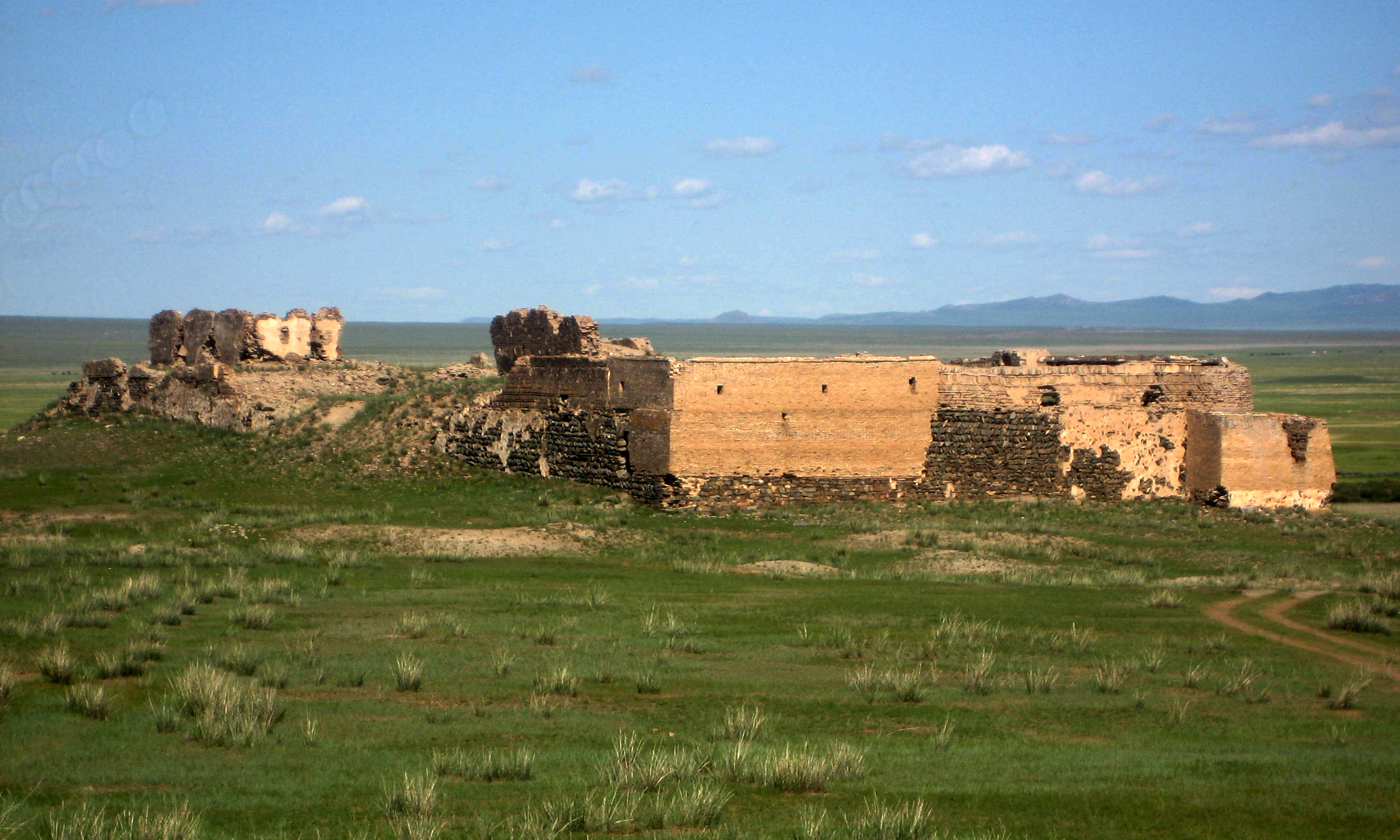
- Castle built by Tsogt Taij, located in Dashinchilen
- Interactive map of Dashinchilen District
- Country: Mongolia
- Province: Bulgan Province

Area
  - Total: 2,318 km^{2} (895 sq mi)
- Time zone: UTC+8 (UTC + 8)

Dashinchilen (Mongolian: Дашинчилэн) is a sum (district) of Bulgan Province in northern Mongolia. The population is about 2,300.

== Geography ==
The district has a total area of 2,318 km^{2}.

== Administrative divisions ==
The district is divided into four bags, which are:

- Dorgont
- Kharaat
- Lakh
- Tuv

== Notable people ==
- Sonomyn Udval (1921-1991) -politician and writer
