= Chonos tribe =

Mongolian tribe

Chonos, one of the Mongol tribes, can be found in Kalmykia, Buryatia, and the Irkutskaya province in the Russian Federation, and also in Mongolia and the People's Republic of China. The name of the tribe translates as "wolves" or "wolf's", and it is one of the most ancient Mongolian tribes. It is famous as a first tribe which joined Genghis Khan.

Other names of the tribe in the various Mongolian languages include "Shono", "Chono", "Shonod", and "Chinos".

According to Rashid-al-Din, the founders of the Chonos tribe were two sons of Charake-Lingum, named Gendu-Chino and Ulug-Chino, while the third son of Charake-Lingum, Surkuduku-Chino, was the father of Ambagay-Khan. Rashid-al-Din states that the male line of the Chonos tribe is Bodonchar - Habichi-Baatar - Dutum-Meneen - Haidu - Charake-Lingum - Gendu-Chino and Ulug-Chino. The name of Gendu-Chino is still found among the Chonos "arvans" in Kalmykia.

In Mongolia the Chonos tribe is found among the Darkhad.

== See also ==
- Chonos Archipelago
