= Aimag =

Administrative subdivision

An aimag, (Note: English: /ˈaɪmæɡ/ EYE-mag; Mongolian: аймаг [ɛ́ːmə̆q]; Oirat: әәмг [ɛːmə́q]) originally a Mongolian word meaning 'tribe', is an administrative subdivision in Mongolia, Russia, and in the Inner Mongolia region of China.

== Mongolia ==
In Mongolia, an aimag is the first-level administrative subdivision. The country currently has 21 aimags. The capital Ulan Bator is administered as an independent municipality.

During the Qing dynasty, Khalkha was subdivided into four aimags (Setsen Khan Aimag, Tüsheet Khan Aimag, Sain Noyon Khan Aimag and Zasagt Khan Aimag). An aimag was further subdivided into "banners" (khoshuu). Each aimag had an assembly of the local nobility, commonly named "league" in English (chuulga in Mongolian). This administrative structure was kept until 1930, when the current structure with smaller aimags, subdivided into sums, was introduced.

== Inner Mongolia ==
In Inner Mongolia, aimags (in the Inner Mongolian context, usually translated as "league", from Chinese: 盟; pinyin: méng) are a prefecture-level subdivision, first-level when seen from Inner Mongolia and second-level when seen from the whole of China. Currently, Inner Mongolia has three aimags: Xilin Gol, Hinggan, and Alxa. Inner Mongolian aimags are subdivided into banners (khoshuu in Mongolian, 旗 in Chinese) and further into sums (苏木 in Chinese).

During the Qing dynasty, Inner Mongolia was divided into six assemblies of the local nobility (chuulga in Mongolian; 盟 in Chinese). After 1949, this administrative division was largely kept, except that in Mongolian, the term chuulga was replaced by aimag, and that several aimags were added. Beginning in the 1980s, most aimags have been converted into prefecture-level cities.

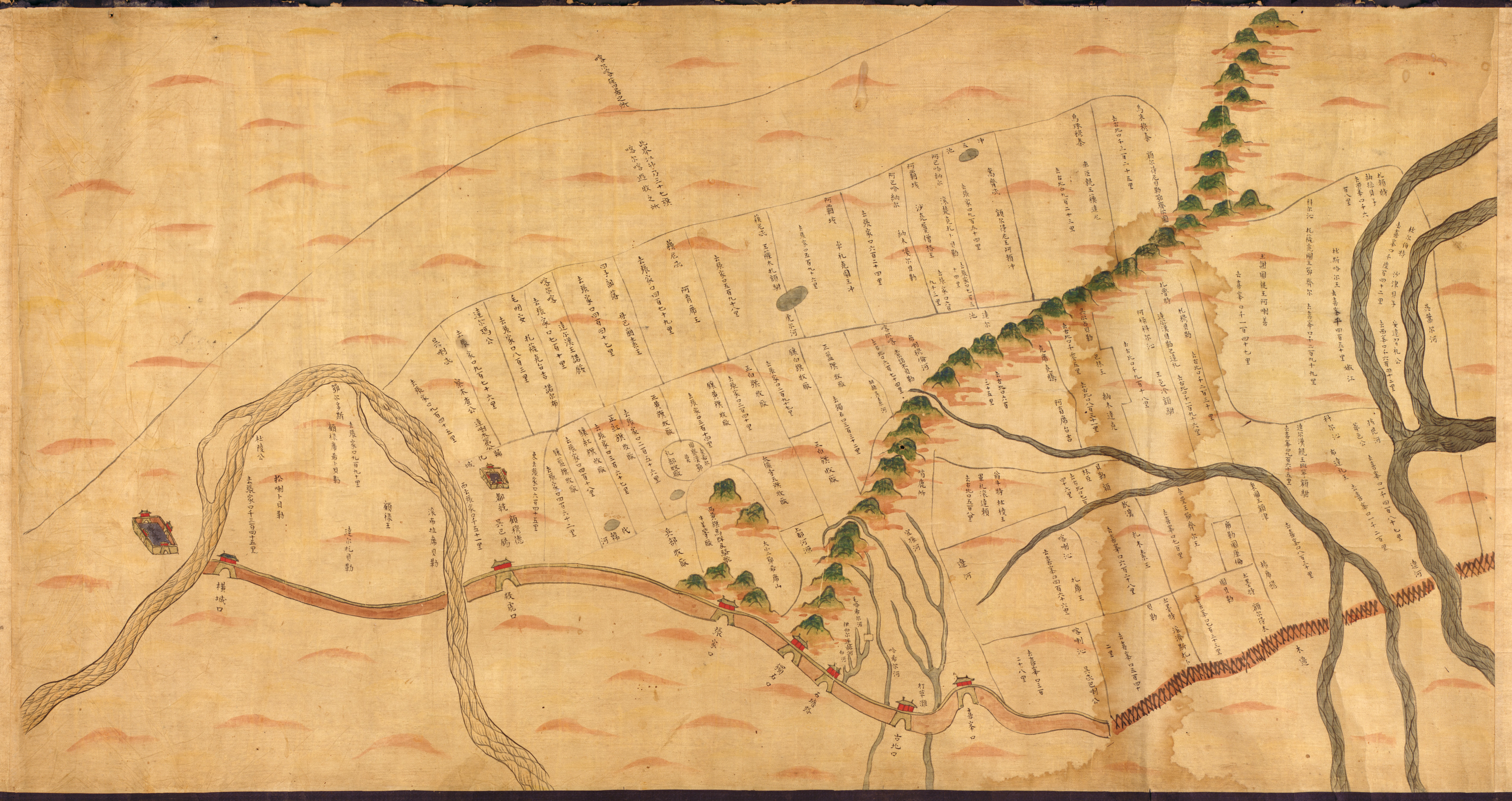
Map of Inner Mongolia khoshuu during Qing rule

== Russia ==
In some federal subjects of Russia, municipal districts are called aimags:

- in the Altai Republic (Altay: аймак);
- in the Republic of Buryatia (Russian Buryat: аймаг);
- in the Republic of Mordovia (Moksha: аймак);
- in the Republic of Khakassia (Khakas: аймах).

== See also ==
- Sum (administrative division)
- Mongolia under Qing rule
- Administrative divisions of Mongolia during Qing
