= Choghtu Khong Tayiji =

Mongol prince

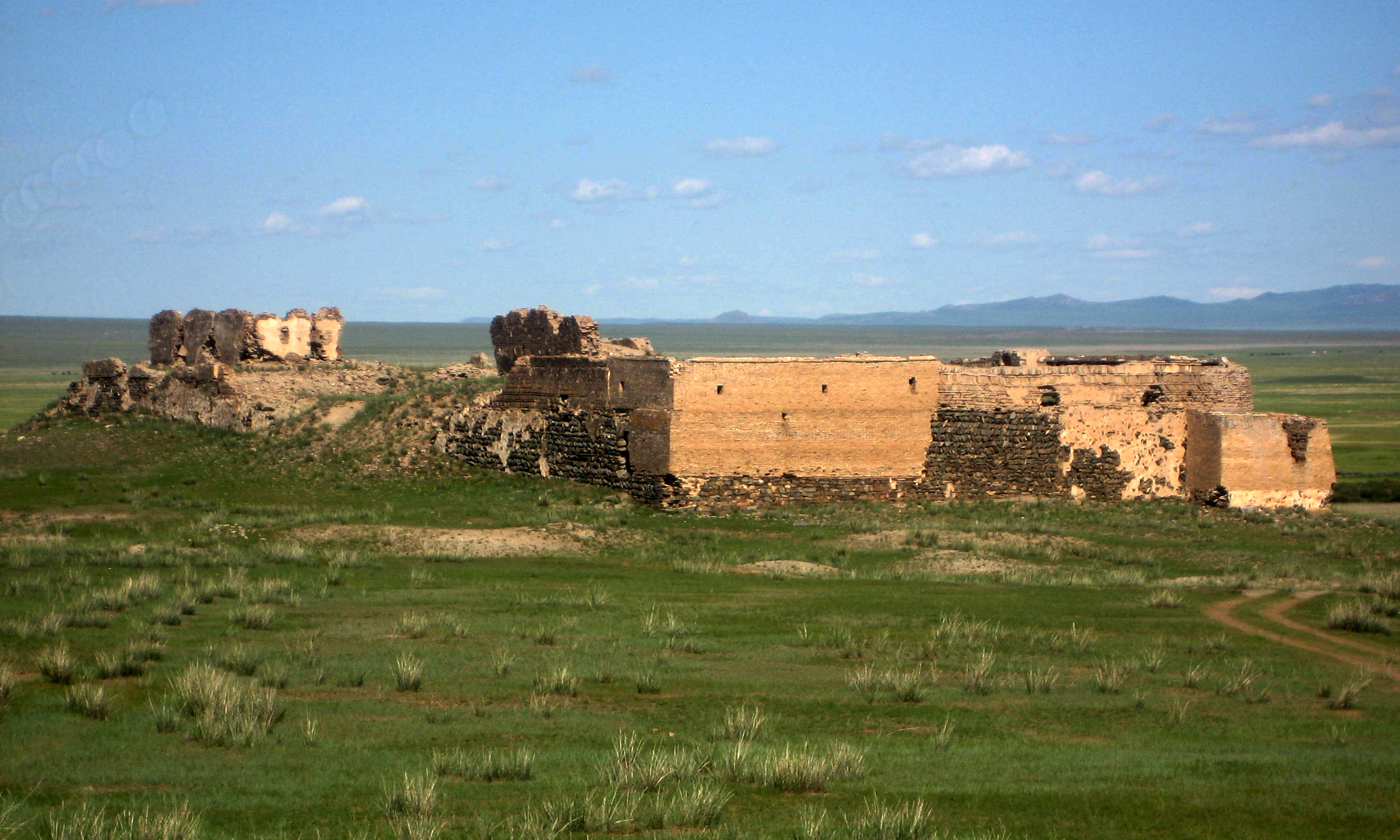
The remains of the White House of Choghtu Khong Tayiji, built by Choghtu Khong Tayiji in 1601, located in Dashinchilen sum of Bulgan Aimag

Tümengken Choghtu Khong Tayiji (Classical Mongolian: ᠲᠦᠮᠡᠩᠬᠡᠨ
ᠴᠣᠭᠲᠤ
ᠬᠤᠩ
ᠲᠠᠶᠢᠵᠢ, Tümengken čoγtu qong tayiǰi; modern Mongolian: Түмэнхэн Цогт Хунтайж, [ˈtumən.xɛŋ ˈt͡sɔx.tə ˈxuŋ.tæt͡ʃ], Tümenkhen Tsogt Khun Taij; Chinese: 綽克圖台吉; 1581–1637), was a noble in Northern Khalkha. He expanded into Amdo (present-day Qinghai) to help the Karma Kagyu sect of Tibetan Buddhism but was overthrown by Güshi Khan, who supported the rival Gelug sect. He is also known for writing a famous poem in 1621, which was transcribed on the surface of a rock in 1624, and still exists.

He established a base on the Tuul river. Known as an intellectual, he embraced the Karma sect and built monasteries and castles. In 1601, he built the White Castle, or the White House of Choghtu Khong Tayiji.

He submitted himself to Ligdan Khan, last grand khan of the Mongols. He took part in Ligdan's campaign to Tibet to help the Karma sect although Ligdan Khan died in 1634 before they joined together. But he pursued the campaign. In the same year, he conquered the Tümed around Kokonor (Qinghai Lake) and moved his base there. By request from Shamar Rabjampa, he sent an army under his son Arslan to central Tibet in 1635. However, Arslan attacked his ally Tsang army. He met the fifth Dalai Lama and paid homage to Gelukpa monasteries instead of destroying them. Arslan was eventually assassinated by Choghtu's order.

The Geluk sect asked for help Törü Bayikhu (Güshi Khan), the leader of the Khoshut tribe of the Oirat confederation. In 1636, Törö Bayikhu led the Khoshuts and the Dzungars to Tibet. In the next year a decisive war between Choghtu Khong Tayiji and Törü Bayikhu ended in the latter's victory and Choghtu was killed.

Descendants of Sutai Yeldeng, Choghtu's grandson, succeeded the jasagh of a banner in Sain Noyon Khan Aimag.

He has traditionally been portrayed as evil by the Geluk sect. On the other hand, the Mongolian movie Tsogt taij (1945) treated him as a national hero.
