= Tüsheet Khan =

Chingisid Khanate and later province of Khalkha Mongol

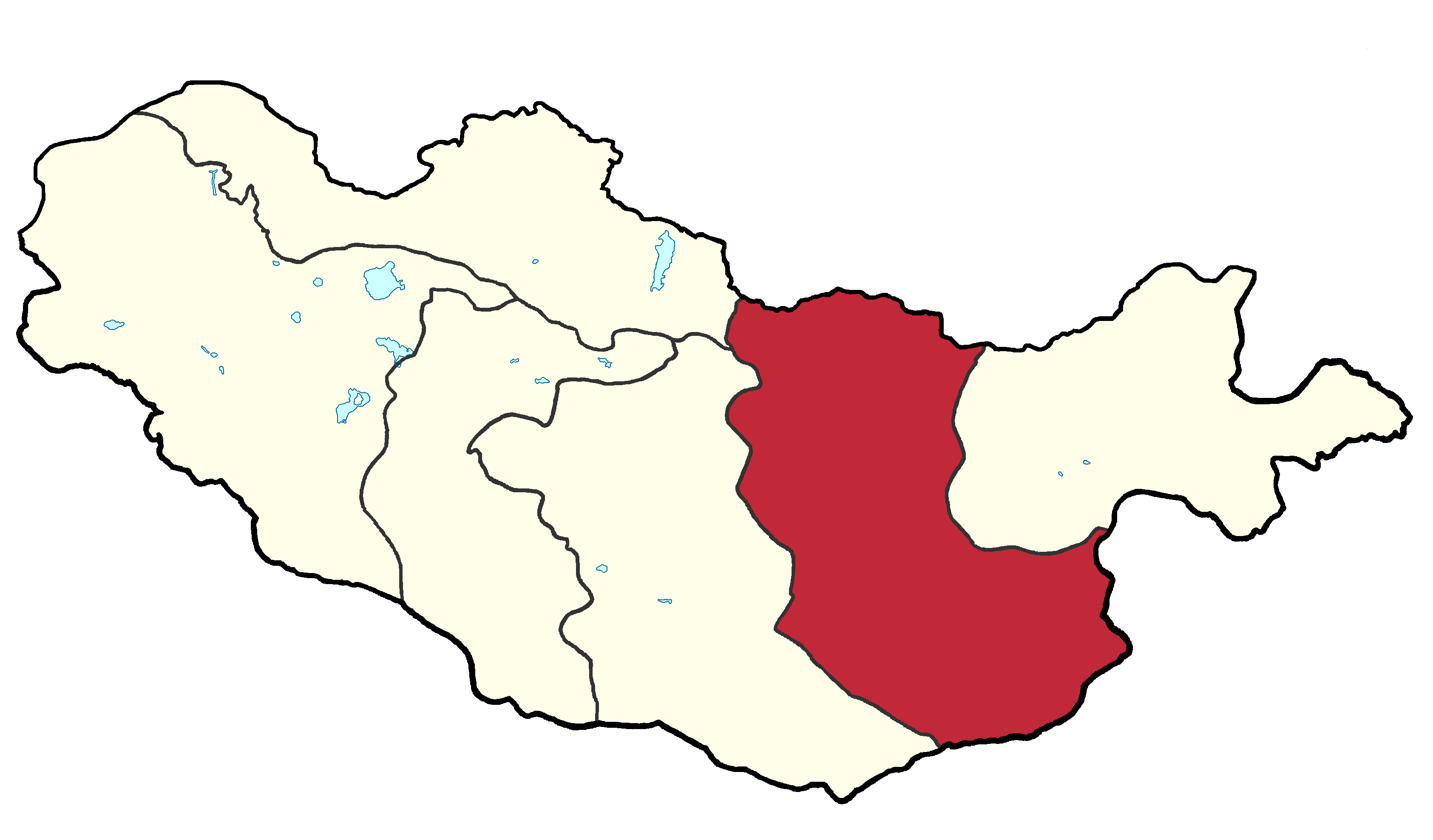
1820 map showing Tusheet Khan aimag

Tüsheet Khan (Note: Mongolian: ᠲᠦᠰᠢᠶᠡᠲᠦ ᠬᠠᠨ Түшээт хан [tʰʉɕétʰ χaɴ]; simplified Chinese: 土谢图汗; traditional Chinese: 土謝圖汗; pinyin: Tǔxiètú hàn) refers to the territory as well as the Chingizid dynastic rulers of the Tüsheet Khanate, one of four Khalka khanates that emerged from remnants of the Mongol Empire after the death of Dayan Khan's son Gersenji in 1549 and which continued until 1930.

== History ==
Through most of the 17th century, the Tüsheet Khan, along with the Setsen Khan, comprised two Left Wing (or Left Flank) Khalkha Mongol khanates situated in central and eastern areas of present-day Mongolia with the Jasaghtu Khan and the Altan Khan comprising the two Right Wing (western) khanates. The Altan Khan ceased to exist after a series of defeats at the hands of their western neighbors the Oirat Dzungar Khanate in the late 17 century. The Tüsheet Khan often exerted more influence and power over the other Khans as it occupied most of modern central Mongolia, an area that included the Orkhon Valley, the ancient Mongol capital of Karakorum, and the religious center of Erdene Zuu.

The 3rd Dalai Lama declared Abtai (1554–1588), grandson of Gersenji, Khan of the Tüsheet following their meeting at Guihua (present day Hohhot) in 1587. In the years leading up to the meeting, Abtai had converted to Buddhism and founded Erdene Zuu, one of Mongolia's first Buddhist monasteries, near the ruins of Karakorum. Following his meeting with the Dalai Lama, Abtai declared Tibetan Buddhism the state religion of his khanate. Zanabazar, the first Jebtsundamba Khutuktu (Tibetan Buddhist spiritual leader of Khalkha Mongols) was the son of Tüsheet khan Gombodorj (1594–1655) and the great-grandson of Abtai Sain Khan. His migratory palace, the Örgöö, would eventually settle in the location of Mongolia's present day capital Ulaanbaatar.

In 1691, the leaders of the Tüsheet Khan, the Jasaghtu Khan, and the Setsen Khan fled to Inner Mongolia where they pledged fealty to the Kangxi Emperor of the Qing dynasty in return for protection against the invading Dzungar (western) Mongolian forces under Galdan Boshugtu Khan. After the Qing's victory over the Dzungars at the Battle of Jao Modo in 1697, the three khanates became provincial subdivisions or aimags of the Manchus and their respective khans were made nominal leaders. The area of Tüsheet Khan aimag was also called "Khalka Rear Zam" (Mongolian: Халхын хойт зам, Chinese: 喀爾喀後路) by Qing dynasty. In 1725, the Qing created a fourth aimag, Sain Noyon Aimag, carved out of 19 khoshuu (sub-districts) in western Tüsheet Khan Aimag. Since 1728, each aimag was governed by aimag congress chigulgan (чуулган) comprising the lords of the khoshuns; the chigulgan daruga (чуулган дарга - official presiding the congress) was appointed from the khoshun lords by the Qing government. the congress of Tüsheet Khan aimag was called the "Khan uulyn chuulgan" (Хан уулын чуулган, 汗阿林盟), which was held every three years in Bogd Khan Mountain.

In 1923, following the Mongolian Revolution of 1921, the Tüsheet Khan aimag was renamed Bogd Khan uuliin aimag (Богд Хан уулын аймаг), which named after the Bogd Khan Mountain. In 1930, the four aimags were divided into the present day 21 smaller aimags, which were subdivided into sums.

== Administrative subdivisions ==
The Tüsheet Khan Province consisted of 22 administrative subdivisions.

- Achit zasgiin khoshuu
- Akhai zasgiin khoshuu
- Baatar zasgiin khoshuu
- Darkhan zasgiin khoshuu
- Daichin zasgiin khoshuu
- Dalai zasgiin khoshuu
- Jonon zasgiin khoshuu
- Bishrelt zasgiin khoshuu
- Zorigt zasgiin khoshuu
- Ilden zasgiin khoshuu
- Mergen zasgiin khoshuu
- Süjigt zasgiin khoshuu
- Setsen zasgiin khoshuu
- Tüsheet zasgiin khoshuu
- Tüsheet khan khoshuu
- Tüsheet khan khoshuu's back deer hunter's otog
- Üizen zasgiin khoshuu
- Tsogtoi zasgiin khoshuu
- Eyetei zasgiin khoshuu
- Erdene daiching zasgiin khoshuu
- Erdene zasgiin khoshuu
- Yalguun baatar zasgiin khoshuu

== Tüsheet Khans ==
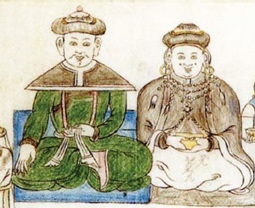
Abtai Sain Khan (r 1554–1586) with his wife

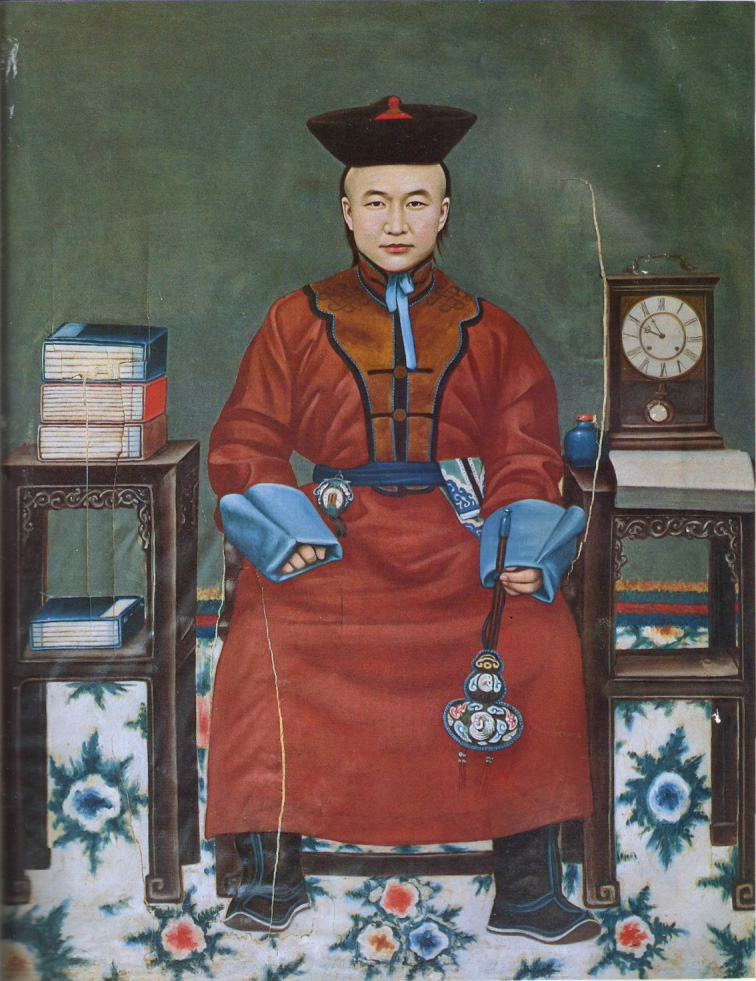
Tusheet Khan Nasantsogt (r. 1863–1900)

1. Abtai (1586–1588), Ochirai Sain khaan
2. Erkhi (1588–1610?), Ochirai Mergen khaan
3. Gombodorj (1610?–1655), Ochirai Tüsheet khaan
4. Chakhundorj (Chikhundorj, 1655–1699), Ochirai Tüsheet khaan
5. Efü Dondubdorj (1700–1702), Ochirai bat Tüsheet khan
6. Rabdandorj (1702–1719), Ochirai bat Tüsheet khan
7. Vanjildorj (1719–1732), Ochirai bat Tüsheet khan
8. Dondandorj (Tubdandorj, 1732–1743), Ochirai bat Tüsheet khan
9. Dondobdorj (Togtokhdorj, 1743–1745), Ochirai bat Tüsheet khan
10. Yampildorj (1745–1759), Ochirai bat Tüsheet khan
11. Tsedendorj (1759–1793 and 1794–1815), Ochirai bat Tüsheet khan
12. Minjüürdorj (1793–1794), Ochirai bat Tüsheet khan
13. Oidubdorj (1815–1829), Ochirai bat Tüsheet khan
14. Erentei (1829–1832), Ochirai bat Tüsheet khan
15. Tserendorj (1832–1863), Ochirai bat Tüsheet khan
16. Nasantsogt (1863–1904), Ochirai bat Tüsheet khan
17. Dashnyam (1904–1912), Ochirai bat Tüsheet khan
18. Dorjsürenkhoroljab (1912–1923), Ochirai bat Tüsheet khan

== Chigulgan daruga ==
1. Vanjildorj (1728–1732), Tüsheet khan
2. Danzandorj (1732–1733), chin van
3. Dondobdorj (1733–1743), Tüsheet khan
4. Tsengünjav (1743–1746), Janjin van
5. Yampildorj (1747–1764), Tüsheet khan
6. Dashpil (1764–1765), Jün van zeregt beis
7. Chavga yarinpil daichin van (1765–1777)
8. Tsedendorj (1777–1783), Tüsheet khan
9. Sündevdorj (1783–1798), Jasagh khoshuuny beis
10. Tsedendorj (1799–1815), Tüsheet khan
11. Tüchinjav (1815–1817), Jasagh jün van
12. Tsedendorj (1817–1824), Jasagh khoshoi chin van
13. Sonomvanchig (1825–1837), Tüshee gün
14. Puntsagdorj (1837–1846), Üizen gün
15. Erenchindorj (1846–1853), Jasagh khoshoi chin van
16. Tserendorj (1854–1863), Tüsheet khan
17. Tserendorj (1863–1884), Jasagh khoshoi daichin chin van
18. Tserendorj (1884–1889), Tüshee gün
19. Tsedensodnom (1889–1890), Tüshee gün
20. Amgaabazar (1891), Mergen van
21. Puntsagtseren (1892), beis
22. Mishigdorj (1893–1899), Jasagh ulsad tuslagch gün
23. Dondovjalbuupalamdorj (1899–1908), gün
24. Chagdarjav (1909–1913), Jasagg ulsyn Tüshee gün, Tüsheet van
25. Vanchigravdan (1914), Tuslagch gün jonon jasagh
26. Puntsagtseren (1914–1921), Darkhan chin van
