= Gersenji Khongtaiji of the Jalayir =

Mongolian prince (1513–1549)

Gersenji (Note: Mongolian: Гэрсэнз Жалайр Хунтайж, romanized: Gersenz Jalair Khuntaij, pronounced [ké̝rsɪnts tɕɐɮɛ́ːr χʊntʰɛ́ːtɕ]) (1513–1549), also known as Geressandsa, was the 11th and youngest son of Dayan Khan and the second son with Jimsgene khatun. Having appointed over the Jalayir tribe as their ruler, Gersenji was named by his father as chief of the Khalkha Mongol tümen in northern Mongolia, which he ruled from the 1510s until his death in 1549.

== Biography ==
Before his death, Dayan Khan bestowed the six tümens of eastern Mongolia to his eleven sons. His youngest son Gersenji Jalair Khongtaiji received the Khalkha tümen of northern Mongolia, the largest and strongest of the six tümens and the heartland and birthplace of the Mongol empire, while his brothers received tümens in southern Mongolia. In the middle of the sixteenth century, each of Gersenji's seven sons received as his inheritance a specific part of Khalkha Mongolia. They went on to form the houses of Tüsheet Khan, Zasagt Khan and Sechen Khan.

== Family ==
- Father: Dayan Khan
- Mother: Jimsgene Khatun
- Wife: Khatungghai of Uriankhan

=== Descendants ===
- Gersenji Khongtaiji
  - Ashikha Darkhan Khongtaiji
    - Bayandara
      - Laiqur Khan
        - Subandai Jasagtu Khan
    - Tümendara Dayiching
      - Ubashi Khong Tayiji
        - Badma Erdeni Khong Tayiji
          - Rinčin / Lobsang Tayiji
  - Noyantai Khatunbaatar
  - Onokhui Üizen Noyan
    - Abtai Sain Khan
  - Amindural Noyan
    - Möru Buima Noyan
      - Sholoi Setsen Khan
  - Dari Taiji
  - Daldan Khundulen Noyan
  - Samu Buima Noyan
