= Buyan (disambiguation) =

Buyan may refer to:

- Buyan, an island in Slavic mythology

== People ==
- Bayan (khan) (reigned 1302-1309), also known as Buyan, khan of the White Horde
- Buyan Suldus (died 1362), a clan leader of one segment of the Suldus clan of the Taichiud tribe during the 1350s to the 1360s
- Buyan Sechen Khan (1554-1604), Mongol khan of the Northern Yuan Dynasty

== Locations ==
- Lake Buyan, a lake near Lake Tamblingan on the island of Bali, Indonesia
- Buyan, Altai Krai, a location in Russia
- Buyan Island, another location in Russia
- Buyan, Severnaya Zemlya, an island of the Severnaya Zemlya Archipelago
- Buyan Insula, an insula (island) within Ligeia Mare on Saturn's moon Titan

== Other uses ==
- Buyan-class corvette, a class of corvette ships used by the Russian Navy
- Buyan-M-class corvette, an upgraded variant of the Buyan-class

== See also ==
- Baro-Bhuyan
- Bujan (disambiguation)
- Buyang people
- Buyang language
- Buyant (disambiguation)
