= Noble Consort Yijing =

Concubine of Hong Taiji

Abaga Borjigit Namjung 博爾濟吉特娜木鐘
- Noble Consort Yijing 懿靖貴妃

Primary Consort of the Northern Yuan Dynasty
- Reign: 17th century – 1634
- Born: Abaga Borjigit Namjung; 17th Century; Mongolia
- Died: 1674; Forbidden City, Beijing, Qing dynasty
- Burial: Zhao Mausoleum, Liaoning, China
- Spouse: Ligdan Khan (m. before 1634); Hong Taiji (m.1635)
- Issue: Abunai; Shuchai; Princess Duanshun of the First Rank; Bomubogor
Posthumous name
- Noble Consort Yijing 懿靖貴妃
- House: Abaga Borjigit (by birth); Aisin Gioro (by marriage)
- Father: Prince Abagai of the Second Rank
- Mother: Unknown

Lady Namjung (Chinese: 娜木鐘, Manchu: ᠨᠠᠮ ᠵᡠᠩ; died 1674) of the Abaga Borjigit clan, formally known as Noble Consort Yijing (懿靖貴妃), was the consort of Ligdan Khan of the Northern Yuan Dynasty, after his death became an imperial concubine of Emperor Hong Taiji of the Qing dynasty.

== Life ==
Her personal name was Namjung (娜木鐘).

=== Family background ===
Noble Consort Yijing's family was prestigious. She was a Mongol woman from the Abaga Borjigit clan (博爾濟吉特氏). Her father was Dorji of the Abaga, an Abaga prince of the second rank. Because Dorji became the father-in-law of both Ligdan Khan and Hong Taiji, he was known as Ečige Noyan, meaning "Father Noyan". She had two sisters: one married Sereng Erdeni (塞冷額爾德尼), while another, Ahai (阿海), also known as Aqai Khatun, married Sholoi Setsen Khan.

=== Ligden Khan Era ===
It is unknown when she became a consort of Ligden Khan, Khagan of Northern Yuan dynasty. She was granted the title of Primary Consort Duoluo, later changed to Primary Consort Nangnang (囊囊福晉). Her husband died in 1634 and one year later, in 1635, she gave birth to his son named Abunai (阿布奈). It is possible that she also had a daughter as there is another record of her raising a Mongolian woman after she became one of the wives of Hong Taiji.

=== Chongde Era ===
After Ligden Khan died, Hong Taiji married Lady Namjung and Lady Batmadzoo as his concubines. Her residence was Linzhi Palace (麟趾宮), located in the west side of Qingning Palace (宮清寧宮) of the Shenyang Imperial Palace Lady Namjung was conferred the title of Noble Consort. On 30 April 1636, she gave birth to the 11th daughter of Hong Taiji, Princess Duanshun of the First Rank. Later, she gave birth Bomubogor on 20 January 1642.

Abaga Borjigit Namjung died in 1674 and was awarded the title of Noble Consort Yijing. She was buried in the Zhaoling garden (清昭陵).

== Titles ==
- During the reign of the Buyan Sechen Khan (1592–1604):
  - Lady Abaga Borjigit (博爾濟吉特氏)
- During the reign of the Ligden Khutugtu Khan (r.1604–1634):
  - Primary Consort Duoluo (多羅多羅大福晉)
  - Primary Consort Nangnang (囊囊福晉)
- During the reign of Hong Taiji (r. 1636 – 1643):
  - Noble Consort (貴妃, from 1636)
  - Noble Consort Yijing (懿靖貴妃, from 1674)

== Issue ==
- As Primary Consor Nangnang:
  - Shuchai (淑侪), Ligden Khan's possible daughter
  - Abunai (阿布奈; 1635 – 1675), Prince Chahar of the First Rank (察哈尔亲王), Ligden Khan's second son
- As Noble Consort:
  - Princess Duanshun of the First Rank (固倫端順公主; 30 April 1636 – July/August 1650), Hong Taiji's 11th daughter
  - Bomubogor, Prince Xiangzhao of the First Rank (襄昭親王 博穆博果爾; 20 January 1642 – 22 August 1656), Hong Taiji's 11th son

== See also ==
- Ranks of Imperial Consorts in China#Qing
- Qing dynasty nobility
