= Empress Xiaoduanwen =

Empress of the Qing dynasty from 1636 to 1643

Empress Xiaoduanwen 孝端文皇后
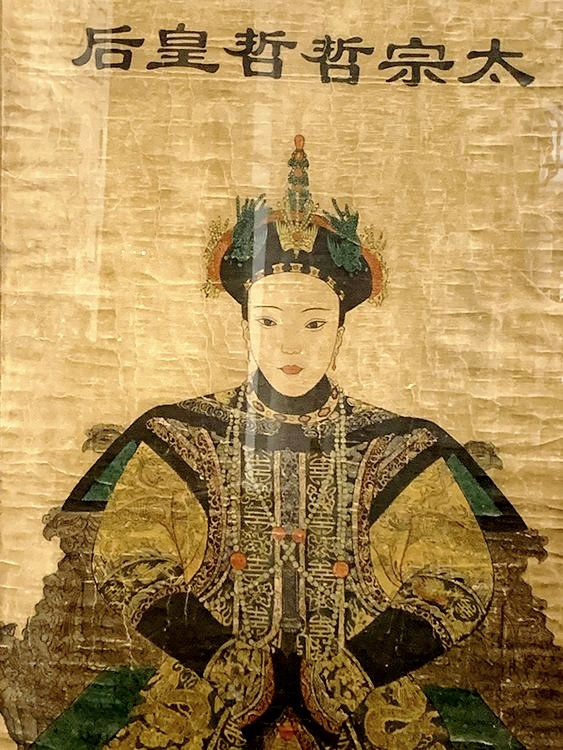
- Portrait of Empress Xiaoduanwen in court dress, by anonymous painter

Empress consort of the Qing dynasty
- Tenure: 1636 – 21 September 1643
- Successor: Erdeni Bumba
- Born: 31 May 1599
- Died: 28 May 1649 (aged 49); Forbidden City, Shuntian Prefecture, Zhili (in present-day Beijing)
- Burial: Zhao Mausoleum
- Spouse: Hong Taiji (m. 1614; died 1643)
- Issue: Princess Wenzhuang of the First Rank; Princess Jingduan of the First Rank; Princess Yong'an of the First Rank
Names
- Jerjer (哲哲)
Posthumous name
- Empress Xiaoduan Zhengjing Renyi Zheshun Cixi Zhuangmin Futian Xiesheng Wen (孝端正敬仁懿哲順慈僖莊敏輔天協聖文皇后)
- Clan: Borjigin (博爾濟吉特; by birth); Aisin-Gioro (by marriage)
- Father: Manggusi
- Mother: Gunbu

Chinese name
- Traditional Chinese: 孝端文皇后
- Simplified Chinese: 孝端文皇后
Transcriptions
Standard Mandarin
- Hanyu Pinyin: Xiàoduānwén Huánghòu

Manchu name
- Manchu script: ᡥᡳᠶᠣᠣᡧᡠᠩᡤᠠ ᡩᠣᡵᠣᠩᡤᠣ ᡤᡝᠩᡤᡳᠶᡝᠨ ᡧᡠ ᡥᡡᠸᠠᠩᡥᡝᠣ
- Romanization: hiyoošungga doronggo genggiyen šu hūwangheo

Empress Xiaoduanwen (31 May 1599 – 28 May 1649), of the Khorchin Borjigin clan, personal name Jerjer, was a wife of Hong Taiji. She was seven years his junior.

== Life ==
=== Family background ===
- Father: Manggusi (莽古思); held the title of prince of the first rank (親王)
  - Grandfather: Namusai (納穆賽); held the title of beile (貝勒)
- Mother: Gunbu (袞布)
- One elder brother and one younger brother
- Two younger sisters

=== Wanli era ===
Jerjer was born on the eighth day of the intercalary fourth lunar month in the 27th year of the reign of the Wanli Emperor, which translates to 31 May 1599 in the Gregorian calendar.

On 28 May 1614, Jerjer married Hong Taiji and became one of his multiple wives.

=== Tianming era ===
In 1623, Hong Taiji divorced his second primary consort, and elevated Jerjer to the position.

Lady Borjigit's niece, Bumbutai, the future Empress Dowager Zhaosheng, would marry Hong Taiji in March or April 1625.

Jerjer gave birth in 1625 to Hong Taiji's second daughter, Princess Wenzhuang of the First Rank, on 2 August 1628 to his third daughter, Princess Jingduan of the First Rank, and on 7 October 1634 to his eighth daughter, Princess Yong'an of the First Rank.

Another niece, Harjol, the future primary consort Minhui, would marry Hong Taiji on 6 December 1634.

=== Chongde era ===
When Hong Taiji conferred titles on five of his wives in August 1636, he instated Jerjer as consort of the central palace.

=== Shunzhi era ===
The system of honors and titles was quite chaotic during the early years of the Qing dynasty and Jerjer wasn't elevated to the rank of empress dowager following Hong Taiji's death, she held the status and power due to one.

Jerjer died on 28 May 1649 and was interred in the Zhao Mausoleum. She was posthumously honoured with the title "Empress Xiaoduanwen".

== Titles ==
- During the reign of the Wanli Emperor (r. 1572–1620):
  - Lady Borjigit
  - Secondary consort (側福晉; from 28 May 1614)
- During the reign of Nurhaci (r. 1616–1626):
  - Primary consort (大福晉; from 1623)
- During the reign of Hong Taiji (r. 1626–1643):
  - Empress (皇后; from Aug 1636)
- During the reign of the Shunzhi Emperor (r. 1643–1661):
  - Empress Dowager (皇太后; from 21 Sep 1643)
  - Empress Xiaoduanwen (孝端文皇后; from 1649)

== Issue ==
- Makata (馬喀塔), Princess Wenzhuang of the First Rank (固倫溫莊公主; 10 September 1625 – April/May 1663), Hong Taiji's second daughter
  - Married Erke Khongghor (額爾克孔果爾; d. 1641), of the Chahar Borjigin clan, on 16 February 1636
  - Married Abunai (阿布奈; 1635–1675), of the Chahar Borjigin clan, in 1645, and had issue (two sons)
- Dazhe (達哲), Princess Jingduan of the First Rank (固倫靖端公主; 2 August 1628 – June/July 1686), Hong Taiji's third daughter
  - Married Kitad (奇塔特; d. 1653), of the Khorchin Borjigin clan, in 1639
- Princess Yong'an Duanzhen of the First Rank (固倫永安端貞公主; 7 October 1634 – February/March 1692), Hong Taiji's eighth daughter
  - Married Bayasihulang (巴雅斯護朗), of the Khorchin Borjigin clan, in 1645

== In popular culture ==
- Portrayed by Mang Lai-ping in The Rise and Fall of Qing Dynasty (1987)
- Portrayed by Wu Qianqian in Xiaozhuang Mishi (2003)
- Portrayed by Jiang Linjing in The Legend of Xiaozhuang (2015)
- Portrayed by Wang Yanhui in Rule the World (2017)

== See also ==
- Imperial Chinese harem system § Qing
- Imperial and noble ranks of the Qing dynasty
