= Bujan (disambiguation) =

Bujan is a village in Kukës County, Albania.

Bujan may also refer to:

- Bujan, Iran (disambiguation), several places in Iran
- Another transliteration for Buyan, a mysterious island in Russian folklore
- Esteban Buján, Argentine footballer
- George Bujan, 1940s NFL footballer

== See also ==
- Buyan (disambiguation)
- Bujang Valley
