= Bujan, Iran =

Bujan or Boojan (Persian: بوجان) may refer to:

- Bujan, Hamadan
- Bujan, Kerman
- Bujan, Tehran
