= Tümen Zasagt Khan =

Tümen Zasagt Khan Түмэн Засагт хаан ᠵᠠᠰᠠᠭᠲᠤ ᠬᠠᠭᠠᠨ
- Khagan of the Mongols
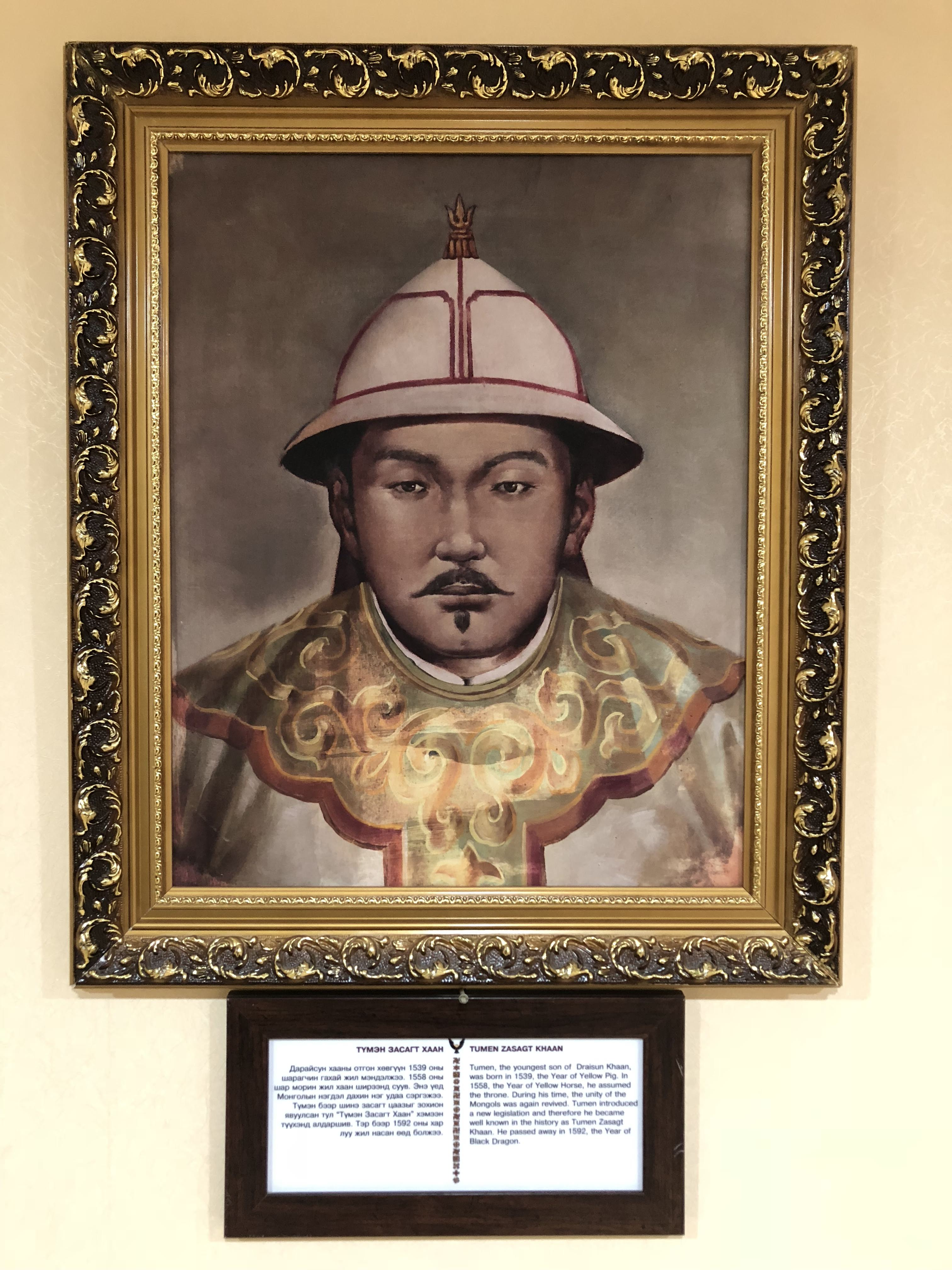

Khagan of the Northern Yuan dynasty
- Reign: 1558–1592
- Predecessor: Darayisung Gödeng Khan
- Successor: Buyan Sechen Khan
- Born: 1539; Outer Mongolia
- Died: 1592 (aged 52–53); Outer Mongolia
Names
- Tümen
- House: Borjigin
- Dynasty: Northern Yuan
- Father: Darayisung Gödeng Khan
- Religion: Tibetan Buddhism

Zasagt Khan (Mongolian: Засагт Хаан; Chinese: 扎薩克圖汗), born Tümen (Mongolian: Түмэн; Chinese: 圖們) (1539–1592), was a khagan of the Northern Yuan dynasty, reigning from 1558 until his death in 1592. He succeeded Darayisung Gödeng Khan and ruled directly over the Chahar. During his reign, the Mongols conquered the Daur and Evenk tribes.

Zasagt Khan was the first of three sons of Darayisung Gödeng Khan. His authority was validated by Altan Khan, and he later coordinated Altan's actions to win over the Uriyangkhai and Daur Mongols. His relatives, Abtai Khan and Khutughtai Sechen Khung Taiji, brought a significant portion of the Four Oirats back into the Mongol fold. In addition to conducting successful raids against the Ming dynasty, Zasagt Khan conquered Koko Nur and appointed his son as its ruler.

In 1576, Zasagt Khan and other Mongol princes adopted Tibetan Buddhism after being converted by Ilduni Sanggiduktshi Garma Lama. He assembled the Six Tumens and initiated legal reforms. He compiled a new code of law reportedly based on the Yekhe Zasag of Genghis Khan, earning him the title Jasagtu ("law-giver"). He made peace with the Right Wing Tumens and conferred official titles upon their leaders. He also compelled three Jurchen tribes in Manchuria, including the Jurjis and the Yekhe Tungusians, to pay tribute.

Zasagt Khan died in 1592.

== See also ==
- List of khans of the Northern Yuan dynasty

Tümen Zasagt Khan House of Borjigin
Regnal titles
Preceded by Darayisung Gödeng Khan	Khagan of the Northern Yuan dynasty 1558–1592	Succeeded by Buyan Sechen Khan
