= Buyant =

Buyant may refer to:

- Buyant, Bayan-Ölgii, a sum (district) in Bayan-Ölgii Province, western Mongolia
- Buyant, Khovd, a sum (district) in Khovd Province, western Mongolia
- Buyant River, a river in Khovd Province, western Mongolia
- Buyant-Ukhaa International Airport, Ulaanbaatar, Mongolia

== See also ==
- Buyan (disambiguation)
- Buyantu (1285–1320), fourth emperor of the Yuan dynasty
