= Ligdan Khan =

Khagan of the Northern Yuan Empire

Ligden Khutugtu Khan
- Khagan of the Mongols
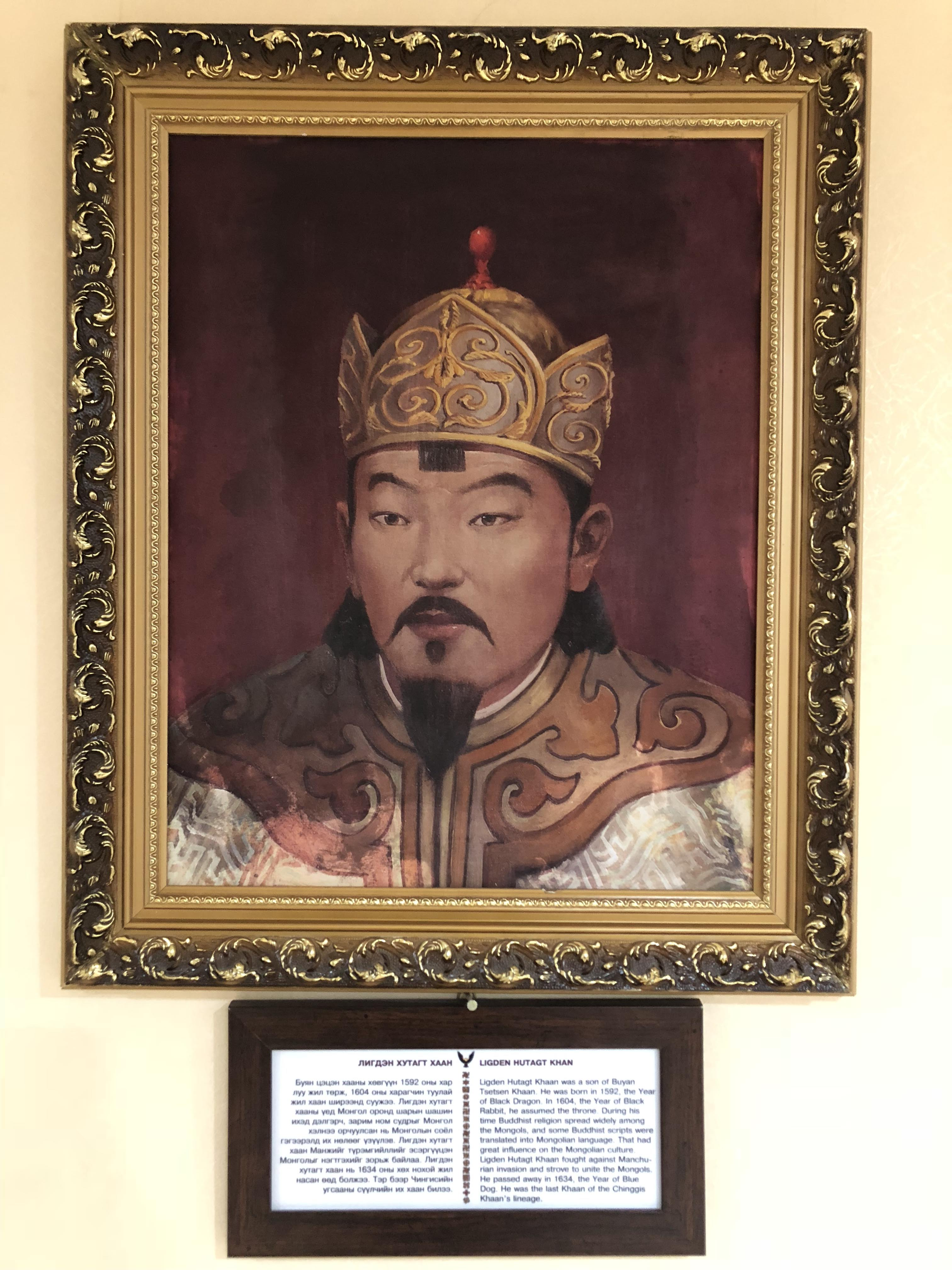

Khagan of Northern Yuan dynasty
- Reign: 1603–1634
- Coronation: 1603
- Predecessor: Buyan Sechen Khan
- Successor: Ejei Khan
- Born: 1588; Sira Mören valley
- Died: 1634 (aged 45–46); Sira Tala (modern Gansu)
- Spouse: Yehenara Sutai; Abaga Borjigit Namjung
- Issue: Ejei Khan; Abunai; Shuchai
Names
- Ligdan
- House: Borjigin
- Dynasty: Northern Yuan
- Father: Mangghus
- Religion: Tengrist; Tibetan Buddhism (Nyingma)

Khutugtu Khan (Mongolian: Хутагт Хаан; Chinese: 庫圖克圖汗), born Ligdan (Mongolian: Лигдэн; Chinese: 林丹), (1588–1634) was a khagan of the Northern Yuan dynasty, reigning from 1604 to 1634. During his reign, he vigorously attempted to reunify the divided Mongol Empire, achieving moderate levels of success. However, his unpopular reign generated violent opposition due to his harsh restrictions over the Mongol tribes as he attempted to centralize the state. His alliance with the Ming dynasty, sponsorship of Tibetan Buddhism in Chakhar and the reorganization of Mongol political divisions were ineffective when the Later Jin dynasty became the major power in East Asia.

== Name ==
His name is from Mongolian "Ligden Khutugt Khan" (Mongolian Cyrillic: Лигдэн Хутугт хаан), title Ligden Khutugt from Standard Tibetan: རྦད་དེ་ཐོག་ཐུ།.

His name is also written Lindan Han (Chinese: 林丹汗; 1588–1634).

== Life and reign ==
Ligden (b. 1588) was a son of Mangghus Mergen Taiji and grandson of Buyan Sechen Khan (r. 1593–1603). Because his father died early, Ligden was chosen to succeed his grandfather Buyan as khan of the Northern Yuan dynasty with the reign title Khutugtu in 1603. At the time the Khagan's appanage, Chakhar people, occupied Sira Mören valley. Ligden divided the Chakhar into right and left wings and built Chaghan city near Abaga Khara Mountain.

The collapse of Ligdan's Chakhar after against with Later Jin in 1630s.

During his early reign, Ligden had the respect and loyalty of other Mongol tümens. Boshigo jinong of the Three Right Wing Tumens expressed his allegiance to Ligden Khan. Allied with princes of the Southern Khalkha (Baarin and Jarud), Ligden raided the Ming dynasty. However, from 1612 on, leaders of the Khorchin and the Jarud became in-laws with the rising Manchu-led Later Jin dynasty. By the early 17th century, the Khan's court had lost most of its power and was under pressure from the Manchus in the east. Hoping that he could consolidate his power over the Mongol tümens, Ligden moved the Buddhist religious center of the Mongols to Chakhar and had himself declared both religious and political leader of the Mongols by a Tibetan religious leader. Ligden revived the old Saskyapa order of Kublai's time (r. 1260–94), inviting the order's Sharba pandita, who was appointed his preceptor in 1617. Sharba installed Mahakala image in Ligden's capital Chagan. Ligden Khan also built temples at Küriye.

In 1618, Ligden signed a treaty with the Ming dynasty to protect their northern border from the Manchus in exchange for thousands of taels of silver. He received an annual subsidy of 40,000 taels of silver in 1620. Sog Zaisai, a Southern Khalkha nobleman, prince Sanasarai of the Khorchin, and Paghwa of the Jarud attacked the Later Jin with more than 10,000–50,000 men to assist the Ming in August 1619, but they were crushed. Because the Later Jin wanted to use the Mongols against the Ming, they persuaded their leaders, including Ligden, to ally with them. Since a conflict with the Later Jin in 1619, the relations between his clan federation and the Manchu federation had continuously deteriorated. In 1620, after an exchange of contemptuous letters, Ligden and the Later Jin ruler Nurhaci (r. 1616–1626) broke off relations and most of the Eastern Tümens deserted to Nurhaci in 1622–24.

Ligden, on the other hand, by trying to assume this former power, ruled in a progressively aggressive fashion, so several Mongolian tribes opted to form a coalition with the Manchus. When the Khorchin and some formerly allied tribes bonded with the Manchus in 1624, Ligden undertook a punitive expedition and besieged the Khorchin nobleman Oba for 3 days, but retreated when Manchu relief troops arrived. When Ligden Khan called the northern Khalkhas to join him against the Manchus, only Tsogt Taij accepted his appeal.

Ligden aimed at centralizing Mongol rule. He appointed officials to rule the left and right wing tümens, and organized a special court nobility and a corps of 300 baaturs (warriors). In 1627, the other tümens were in full revolt. Princes ruling the Sunid, Uzemchin, and Abaga moved northwest and allied with the Three Right Wing Tumens against Ligden. They attacked Ligden at Zhaocheng. Ligden defeated the allies but lost 10,000 Chakhars. When the Ming court refused to pay subsidy, he raided the Ming Empire, forcing them to renew the treaty. The Ming increased his annual subsidy to 81,000 taels of silver. In 1631 Ligden passed the Khinggan Range and successfully attacked the Khorchin and the Tümed. A powerful alliance of Khorchin, Tümed, Yungshiyebu, Ordos and Abaga was formed against Ligden. They destroyed 4,000 Chahar militias in Hohhot and 3,000 soldiers who were going to take Ligden's subsidy from the Ming. In 1632, the Later Jin khan Hong Taiji and his Mongol allies undertook a campaign against Ligden who avoided a confrontation and with maybe 100,000 Chakhar fled to Kokenuur. Ligden made himself yet more unpopular by seizing the wife of Erinchin jinong and taking refuge in the Eight White Yurts of Genghis Khan in Kokenuur. Allied with the Tibetan monarchs, he opposed Dalai Lama V and Banchin Erdene IV. He died of smallpox at Sira Tala (in modern Gansu) in 1634 while marching to attack dGe-lugs-pa order (Yellow Hat sect) in Tibet.

After Ligden Khan's death, his son Ejei Khan (Erke qongγor eje) returned and was handed over to the Qing dynasty which soon after established control over Inner Mongolia.

== Name ==
The name is borrowed from the Classical Tibetan term legs-ldan. There, the letters s and l had already become silent, g before d could be realized as [n] and a before n got palatalized. In Mongolian sources, the most frequent ways to write the name are Ligda/en and Linda/en, but the intermediate Lingda/en ([ŋ]) does appear as well. a and e are not differentiated in normal Mongolian writing in this position, but a is attested in a strict transcription from Tibetan letters in the chronicle Bolur Erdeni. However, for any Mongolian reader who does not immediately perceive the name to be a loan, the letter g would (by means of consonant harmony and its interaction with vowel harmony) indicate that the word only contains front vowels. This must have been perceived in this fashion at the time of i-breaking as well, as this phonological process took place in back-vocalic words only and would have resulted in *[ɮʲaɢtan] had it been /liɡdan/. Today, western scholars tend to cling to the written form of the Tibetan word and write Ligdan, while Mongolian scholars will usually write Ligden, both pointing to a possible alternative with n. In Chinese, the name is written as 林丹, the standard Pinyin transcription being Líndān.

== Family ==
Consorts and issue:

- Empress Dowager, of Yehe Nara clan (太后葉赫那拉氏), personal name Sutai (苏泰)
  - Ejei, Khagan of Northern Yuan (額哲; d.1641), 1st son
- Empress Dowager Nangnang, of Abaga Borjigin clan (囊囊太后 博爾濟吉特氏;? – 1674), personal name Namjung (娜木鐘)
  - Abunai, Prince Chahar of the First Rank (察哈尔亲王 阿布奈; 1635 – 1675), 2nd son
  - Shuchai (淑侪), 1st daughter
- Empress Dowager, of the Borjigin clan (太后 博爾濟吉特氏), personal name Erjei (俄尔哲依)
- Empress Dowager Boqi (伯奇太后), personal name Tasina (苔丝娜)
- Consort Doutumen of the Abaga Borjigin clan (窦土门福晋 博爾濟吉特氏) personal name Batmadzoo (巴特瑪璪)
- Consort Gortumen (郭尔土门福晋), married later Gunchusi Sengge (衮出斯僧格)

== See also ==
- List of khans of the Northern Yuan dynasty

Ligdan Khan House of Borjigin (1206–1634) Died: 1604–1634
Regnal titles
Preceded by Buyan Sechen Khan	Khagan of the Northern Yuan dynasty 1604–1634	Succeeded by Ejei Khan
