= Princess Wenzhuang =

Qing dynasty princess

Gurun Princess Wenzhuang 固倫溫莊公主

Princess of the First Rank
- Reign: 1657 – 1663

Princess Consort Chahar of the First Rank
- Reign: 1636 – 1675
- Born: 9 August 1625
- Died: 1663 (aged 37–38)
- Spouse: Ejei Khan (m.1636); Abunai (m.1645)
- Issue: Borni; Lubuzung
Names
- Aisin Gioro Makata (爱新觉罗 馬喀塔); Princess Wenzhuang, of the First Rank (固倫溫莊公主)
- House: Aisin Gioro (by birth); Chahar Borjigit (by marriage)
- Father: Hong Taiji
- Mother: Empress Xiaoduanwen

Princess Wenzhuang
- Simplified Chinese: 固倫溫莊公主
Transcriptions
Standard Mandarin
- Hanyu Pinyin: Gùlún Wēnzhuāng Gōngzhǔ

Gurun Princess Wenzhuang (固倫溫莊公主; 9 August 1625 – 1663), personal name Makata (馬喀塔), was a princess of the Qing dynasty. She was a daughter of Hong Taiji born by his Mongol wife, Empress Xiaoduanwen.

== Life ==
Lady Makata born on 9 August 1625, her biological mother was the future Empress Xiaoduanwen, who at that time was only a primary consort of Hong Taiji.

On the 10th day of the first lunar month in the tenth year of Tiancong (1636), Makata married Ejei Khan, last khagan of Northern Yuan dynasty. He was granted the title of First Rank Prince. She remained childless during her first marriage. In the 5th of Chongde, Huang Taiji and his wives went hunting together with Princess Makata and her husband.

After her first husband's death, she married Abunai, a younger brother of Ejei Khan, in 1645. She gave birth to two sons during her second marriage, Borni (布尔尼) and Lubuzung (罗布藏).

In 1657, during the reign of Shunzhi, she was granted the title of Princess of the First Rank (固倫長公主) . Two year later, she was named Imperial Princess Yongning of the First Rank (固倫永寧長公主).

During the end of Shunzhi reign, her title was renamed. She became Princess Wenzhuang of the First Rank (固倫溫莊公主).

== Family ==
Parents:

- Father: Hong Taiji, Emperor Wen of the Aisin Gioro clan (皇太極 文皇帝 愛新覺羅氏)
- Mother: Jerjer, Empress Xiaoduanwen of the Khorchin Borjigit clan (孝端文皇后 博爾濟吉特氏)

Consort:

- Prince Consort (驸马): Ejei Khan, Prince Chahar of the First Rank (額哲 察哈尔部氏; d. 1641) of the Chahar Borjigin clan
- Prince Consort (驸马): Abunai, Prince Chahar of the First Rank (阿布奈 察哈尔部氏; d. 1675) of the Chahar Borjigin clan
  - Borni (布尔尼; 1654 – 1675 ), Prince Chahar of the First Rank (察哈尔亲王), first son
  - Lubuzung (罗布藏; d.1675), second son

== Ancestry ==
Giocangga (1526 – 1583)
Taksi (1543 – 1583)
Empress Yi
Nurhaci (1559 – 1626)
Agu
Empress Xuan (d. 1569)
Hong Taiji (1592 – 1643)
Taicu
Yangginu (d. 1584)
Empress Xiaocigao (1575 – 1603)
Princess Wenzhuang (1625 – 1663
Namusai
Manggusi
Empress Xiaoduanwen (1599 – 1649)
Gunbu

== See also ==
- Ranks of imperial consorts in China#Qing
- Royal and noble ranks of the Qing dynasty
