= Pure Consort Kanghui =

Consort of Hong Taiji

Pure Consort Kanghui, of the Abaga Borjigit clan (康惠淑妃 博爾濟吉特氏; 1606 – June/July 1667), was a consort of Hong Taiji. Her personal name was Batemazao (巴特瑪璪).

== Life ==
=== Family background ===
Consort Kanghuishu was a member of Abaga Borjigit clan (阿霸垓博爾濟吉特氏)

- Father: Bodisai Chuhur (博迪塞楚祜爾), a tabunang of Abaga (塔布囊)

=== Life before entering imperial household ===
Batmadzoo was born in 1606 in Abaga, Southern Mongolia. There is no information when did she marry Ligdan Khan of Chahar. After the marriage, Batmadzoo was bestowed a title of Consort Doutumen (竇土門福晉), indicating she had been taken by Doutumen pass (竇土蠻萬戶). Ligdan Khan died in 1634 on his expedition to Qinghai. Batmazoo is alleged to have had a daughter with Ligdan Khan, named Shuchai (淑儕), who married Dorgon in 1640. However, imperial genealogy does not confirm that fact, stating that Dorgon's secondary consort was Lady Gongjit of Chahar.

=== Life in the Qing dynasty imperial court ===
==== During Chongde era ====
In September 1634, Batmadzoo was escorted to Hong Taiji's camp by her servant Duonikuleke (多尼庫勒克). Batmadzoo was accompanied by Ligdan Khan's aunt during the audience with Hong Taiji. After carrying out ritual bows, women were invited to the banket and granted sacrificial lambs and cows. Hong Taiji suggested Batmazao accompanying him, which meant emperor's desire to marry her. As there was no precedent that Manchu emperor had married widowed consort of Mongol khan, Daišan recommended Hong Taiji bestowing Batmadzoo a title of consort. Actually, Hong Taiji's foreign policy strategy involved marriage with 1 empress and two consorts from the ethnical minorities, which complied also with strategies of Mongol tribes. Batmazoo was one of the women selected as Hong Taiji's consorts.

Upon transition from Later Jin to Qing in 1636, Hong Taiji granted Batmazoo a title of secondary consort (側福晉) which was translated into Chinese as Consort Shu (淑妃). Batmazoo's residence in Mukden became Palace of Overflowing with Joy (衍慶宮; manchu: urgun i booi).

==== During Shunzhi era ====
In 1644, the capital city was officially moved to Beijing. In 1652, Shunzhi Emperor upgraded Batmazoo's title to Consort Kanghuishu (康惠淑妃, meaning: healthy, kind and virtuous). All palaces in the Forbidden City, including Cining palace, Yongqing palace and Yanxi palace, were renovated and redeveloped with addition of interconnectors, wells, fish ponds, terraces and walls, costing 194261 taels of silver. Yongqing palace was made a residence of Consort Kanghuishu, while Yanxi palace was given to Noble Consort Yijing in August 1652. Empress Dowager Xiaozhuang resided in Cining palace, a traditional and ceremonial residence of Empresses Dowager during the Ming dynasty.

==== During Kangxi era ====
In 1663, Consort Kanghuishu presented her marriage gifts to Princess Roujia of the Second Rank on the occasion of her marriage to Geng Juzhong together with Grand Empress Dowager Zhaosheng and Empress Dowager Renxian, who favored their adopted daughter. During the dispute whether gifts from consorts dowagers and imperial children could be submitted to Ministry of Internal Affairs head eunuch of Cining palace announced that Consort Kanghuishu had vomited. As Grand Empress Dowager attended the banquet outwards the Yongqing palace, her personal housemaid and head eunuch called a doctor to treat the consort. That accident turned to be a symptom of a serious illness Batmazoo was suffering from. Consort Kanghuishu died in June 1667 and was given a funeral befitting dowager imperial consort.

== Titles ==
=== During the reign of Ligdan Khan ===
- Consort Doutumen (竇土門福晉) - until 1634

=== During the Qing dynasty ===
==== During Chongde era ====
- Consort Shu of Yanqing Palace (衍慶宮淑妃) - from 1636
- Secondary consort of Yanqing Palace (東衍慶宮側福晉; dergi urgun i booi ashan fujin) - from 1636; held complementary with Chinese version

==== During Shunzhi era ====
- Consort Kanghuishu (康惠淑妃) - from 1652
