= Administrative divisions of Mongolia during Qing =

Territorial units of Qing dynasty ruled Mongolia

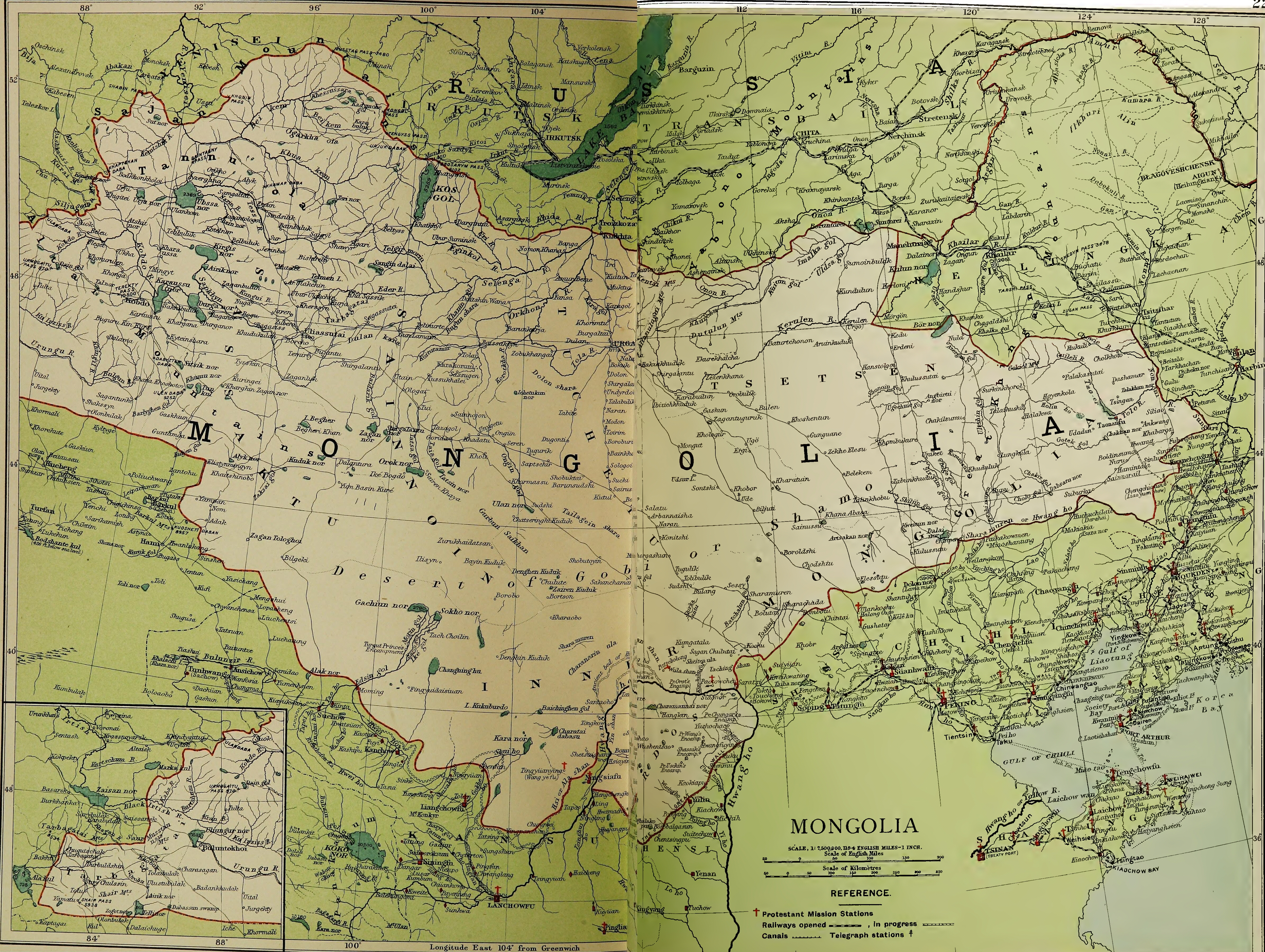
Map of the Mongolian Plateau under Chinese administration.

The Qing dynasty of China ruled over the Mongolian Plateau, including Inner Mongolia and Outer Mongolia. Both regions, however, were separately administered within the empire.

The estate of Jebtsundamba Khutugtu, the Great Shabi (from Mongolian shabi, disciple) in 1723, became independent from the four aimags in the sense that its subjects were exempt from most taxes and corvees. The shabi did not—except the three Darkhad otog in Khövsgöl—control territory. Rather, its subjects mostly lived among the general population. Similar shabis existed for other high lamas.

== Direct control ==
The direct-controlled Mongols (Chinese: 內屬蒙古) were banners (khoshuu) controlled by provinces, generals and ambasa. The following regions were directly controlled by the Manchu:

- Eight Banners of Chahar
- Dariganga - Qing emperor's pasture, where the best horses from both Inner and Outer Mongolia were collected and mastered by the Dariganga tribe. It was controlled from Kalgan. Today's location is Dariganga sum, Sukhbaatar province, Mongolia.
- Guihua Town Tümed (Shanxi)
- Barga (Heilongjiang)
- Tannu Uriankhai 5 banners and 46 or 47 somons (Governor general of Uliastai)
- Myanghad Banner, Zakhchin Banner and Ööld Banner (Khovd)
- Altai Uriankhai and Altai Nuur Uriankhai (Khovd)
- Damxung Mongolians (Tibet)

== Inner Mongolia ==
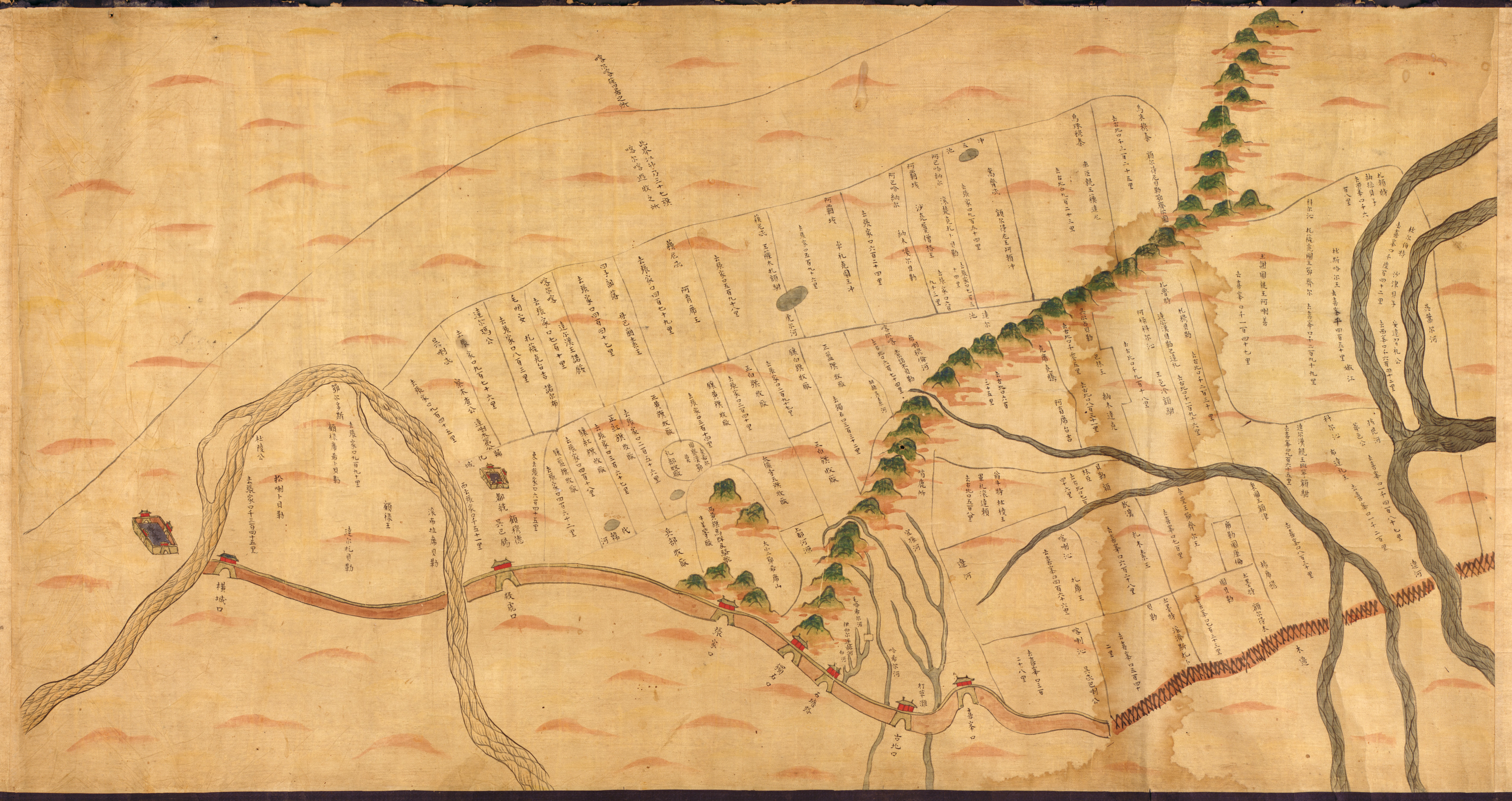
Map of Inner Mongolia khoshuu during Qing rule.

Inner Mongolia's original 24 aimags (ᠠᠢᠮᠠᠭ) were replaced by 49 banners (khoshuus) that would later be organized into six leagues (chuulgans, assemblies). The eight Chakhar banners and the two Tümed banners around Guihua were directly administered by the Manchu.

- Jirim League
  - Khorchin 6 banners
  - Jalaid 1 banner
  - Dörbet 1 banner
  - Gorlos 1 banner
- Josotu League
  - Kharchin 3 banners
    - Kharchin Right Banner
    - Kharchin Middle Banner
    - Kharchin Left Banner
  - Tümed 2 banners
- Juu Uda League
  - Aokhan 1 banner
  - Naiman 1 banner
  - Baarin 2 banners
  - Jarud 2 banners
  - Ar Khorchin 2 banners
  - Onginuud 1 banner
  - Kesigten 1 banner
  - Züün Khalkha 1 banner
- Xilin Gol League
  - Üzemchin 2 banners
  - Khuuchid 2 banners
  - Sünid 2 banners
  - Abga 2 banners
  - Abganar 2 banners
- Ulanqab League
  - Dörben Khüükhed 1 banner
  - Muu Myangan 1 banner
  - Urad 3 banners
  - Baruun Khalkha 1 banner
- Ihe Juu League
  - Ordos Mongols 7 banners

== Outer Mongolia (Khalkha) ==
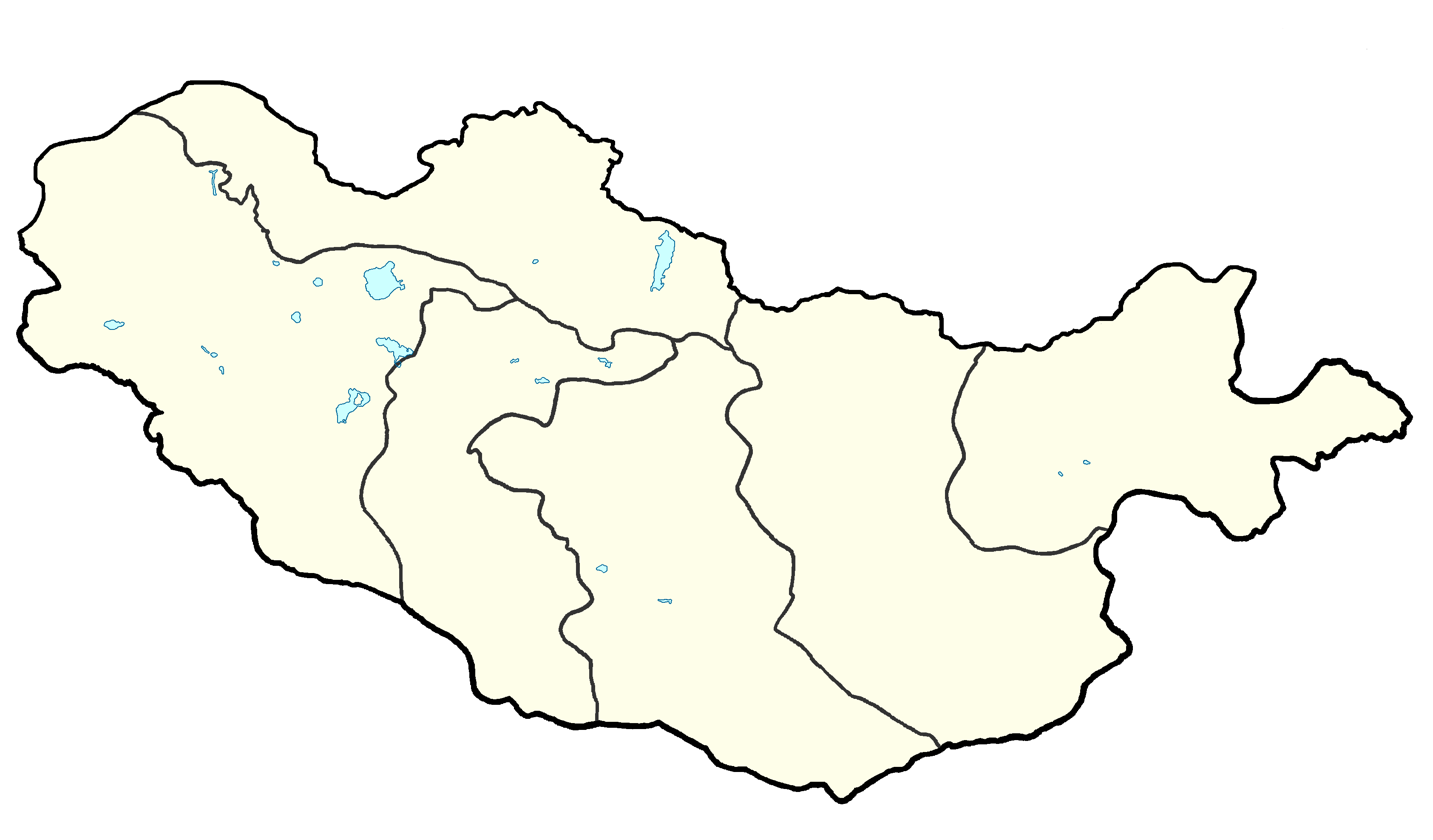
Outer Mongolia aimags under Qing rule (1820 years)

The Khalkha aimags were preserved—with the notable exception of the establishment of Sain Noyan aimag in 1725. Each aimag had a chigulgan, usually named after the place (mountains or rivers) where it convened. The aimags were divided into banners - whose number increased from originally eight eventually to 86—and further into sums. A sum consisted of 150 men fit for military service, a bag of 50. A military governor was installed in Uliastai, and two civil governors (amban) in Khüree and in Kobdo.

- Ochirbatu Tüshiyetu Khan aimag 20 banners
  - Gobi Tüshiye Gong
  - Darhan Chin Wang khoshuu
  - Zorigtu Wang khoshuu
  - Gobi Mergen Wang khoshuu
  - Erdeni Daichin Wang khoshuu
  - Daichin Beise khoshuu
- Sain Noyan aimag 24 banners
  - Sain Noyan 22 banners
  - Ööld Banner
  - Ööld Front Banner
- Maha Samadhi Secen Khan aimag 23 banners
  - Borjigin Secen Wang khoshuu
  - Achitu Wang khoshuu
  - Secen Chin Wang khoshuu
  - Sang Beise khoshuu
  - Höbchi yin Jinong Wang khoshuu
  - Hurtsa Wang khoshuu
  - Dalai Darhan Beile
- Zasagtu Khan aimag 19 banners
  - Erdeni Bishireltu Zasagtu Khan khoshuu
  - Akhai Beile khoshuu
  - Dalai Gong khoshuu
  - Mergen Gong khoshuu
  - Erdeni Degüregchi Wang khoshuu
  - Tsogtoi Beise khoshuu
  - Chin Achit Wang khoshuu
  - Zorigtu Wang khoshuu
  - Jilhanza Hutuhtu shabi
  - Ilagugsan Hutuhtu shabi
  - Sartaul Secen Hang khoshuu
  - Bagatur Wang khoshuu
  - Erdeni Beise khoshuu
  - Darhan Beile khoshuu
  - Daichin Wang khoshuu
  - Süjigtu Gong khoshuu
  - Üizen Beise khoshuu
  - Nomun Khan Hutuhtu shabi
  - Ilden Gong khoshuu
  - Bishireltu Gong khoshuu
  - Itgemjitu Beile khoshuu
  - Yosotu Beise khoshuu
  - Jinong Wang khoshuu

== Tannu Uriankhai ==
- Tannu Banner (Chinese: 唐努旗)
- Salajik Banner (Chinese: 薩拉吉克旗)
- Tojin Banner (Chinese: 托錦旗)
- Khövsgöl Nuur Banner (Chinese: 庫布蘇庫勒諾爾旗)
  - Ar Shirkhten Uriankhai 1 otog (Chinese: 錫爾克騰部落各1佐領)
  - Övör Shirkhten Uriankhai 1 otog
- Khemchik Banner (Chinese: 克穆齊克旗)
- Uliastai General (Amban) 25 sums (Chinese: 烏里雅蘇臺將軍所屬二十五佐領)
- Zasagtu Khan 5 sums (Chinese: 札薩克圖汗部所屬烏梁海五佐領)
- Sain Noyan Hošo Prince 13 sums (Chinese: 賽音諾顏部所屬烏梁海十三佐領)
- Jebtsundamba Khutugtu’s Darkhad Shabinar 5 otog (Chinese: 哲布尊丹巴呼圖克圖所屬烏梁海五佐領)

== Western Hetao Mongolia ==
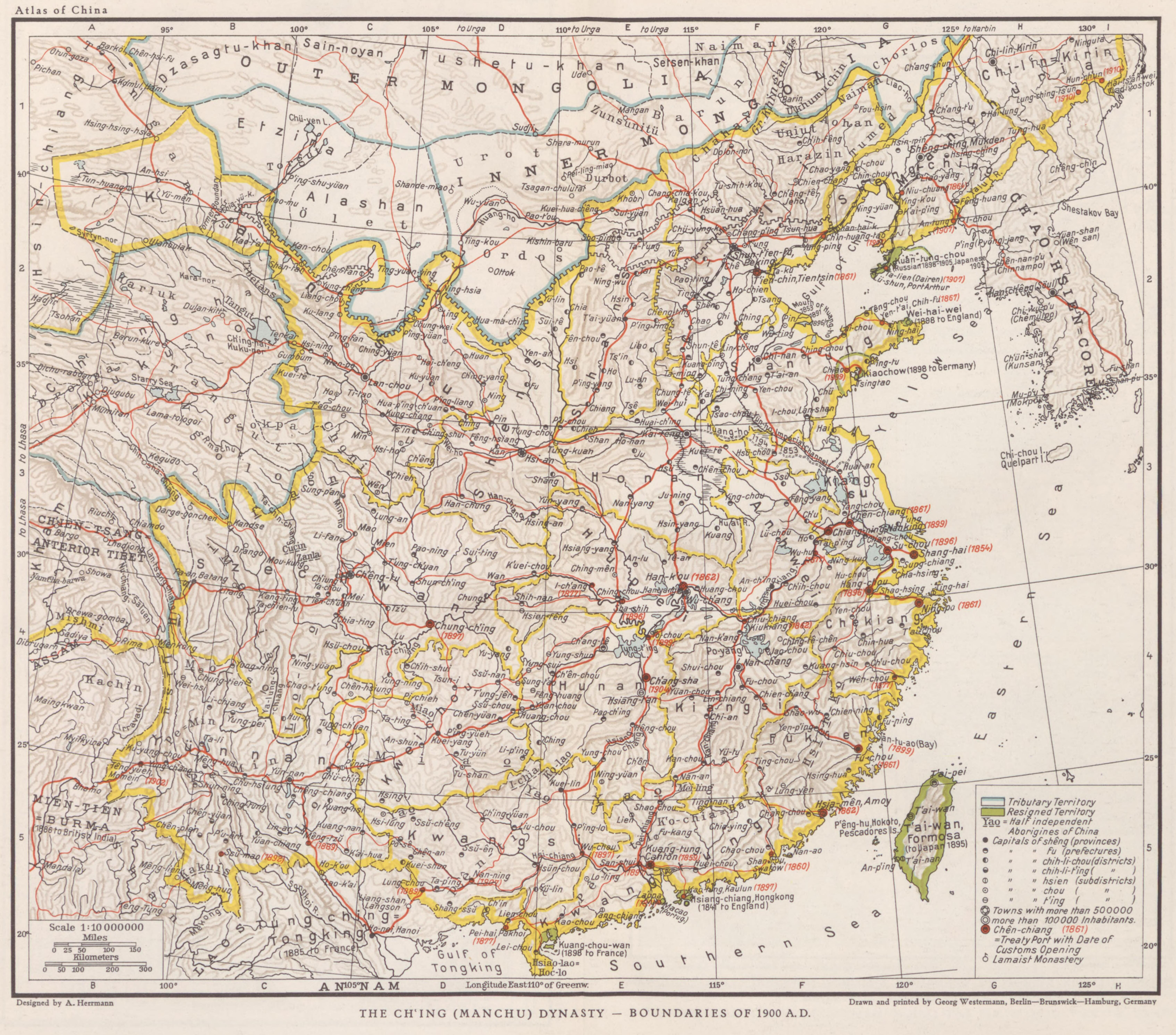
A 1935 map of the Qing Empire c. 1900 showing "Alashan" as a territory separate from both Inner and Outer Mongolia

- Alasha Ööled Banner (阿拉善, Alashan; modern-day Alxa left and right banners in Alxa League, Inner Mongolia)
- Ejine Torghuud Banner (modern-day Ejina banner in Alxa League, Inner Mongolia)

== Other Mongolian banners ==
=== Khovd ===
Also romanized as Hovd or Kobdo, now western Mongolia.

Thirty khoshuu:

- Batu Irugertu Tögs Khülug Dalai Khan aimag
  - Batu Irugertu Tögs Khülug Dalai Khan khoshuu
  - Kobdo Taiachin khoshuu
  - Daichin Zasag khoshuu
  - Dalai Gong khoshuu
  - Jinong Zasag khoshuu
  - Erdeni Zasag khoshuu
  - Erhe Zasag khoshuu
  - Bagatur Zasag khoshuu
  - Mergen Zasag khoshuu
  - Iltei Zasag khoshuu
  - Secen Zasag khoshuu
  - Hurtsa Gong khoshuu
  - Saragul Gong khoshuu
- Ünen Zorigtu Khan aimag
- Altai Uriankhai 7 banners
  - Daichin Gong Banner
  - Tusalagchi Gong Banner
  - Torghuud, Khoshuud 3 banners
  - Zakhchin Örnö, Dorno Banner
  - Hovd Tümed Tariachin Banner

=== Qinghai Mongols ===
- Khoshuud 21 banners
- Choros 2 banners
  - Choros North Middle Banner
  - Choros South Right Wing First Banner
- Khoyid 1 banner
  - Khoyid South Banner
- Torghuud 4 banners
  - Torghuud West Banner
  - Torghuud South Front Banner
  - Torghuud South Middle Banner
  - Torghuud South Rear Banner
- Khalkha 1 banner
  - Khalkha South Right Banner

=== Xinjiang ===
13 banners (in modern-day Xinjiang)

== See also ==
- Administrative divisions of the Qing dynasty
- Qing dynasty in Inner Asia
