= Abunai =

Abunai 阿布奈
- Prince Chahar of the First Rank

Prince Chahar
- Predecessor: Ejei Khan
- Successor: Borni
- Tenure: 1641 – 1669
- Born: 1635
- Died: 1675 (aged 39–40)
- Spouse: Princess Wenzhuang (m.1645)
- Issue: Borni; Lubuzung
- House: Borjigin
- Father: Ligden Khan
- Mother: Abaga Borjigit Namjung, Primary consort Nangnang

Abunai (阿布奈; 1635 – May 5, 1675), known as Prince Chahar of the First Rank (察哈尔亲王), was a Mongol prince of clan Borjigin, second son of Ligden Khan. He opposed Qing influence in his domain and was subsequently placed into house arrest in Shenyang and his son given his title. In 1675 he led the Chahar Mongols joining in the Revolt of the Three Feudatories, but were defeated in battle in April and subsequently killed. Abunai was a direct male-line descendant of Tolui Khan, the youngest of the four sons of Genghis Khan.

== Family ==
Parents

- Father: Ligden Khutugtu Khan (林丹庫圖克圖汗), Khagan of the Northern Yuan dynasty
- Mother: Primary consort Nangnang, of the Abaga Borjigin clan (囊囊太后 博爾濟吉特氏; d. 1674), knowns as Noble Consort Yijing

Consorts and issue:

- Gurun Princess Wenzhuang, of the Aisin Gioro clan (固倫溫莊公主 爱新觉罗氏; 9 August 1625 – 1663), personal name Makata (馬喀塔)
  - Borni, Prince Chahar of the First Rank (察哈尔亲王 布尔尼; 1654 – 1675 ), 1st son
  - Lubuzung (罗布藏; d.1675), 2nd son
