= Bujan, Tehran =

Bujan بوجان
- village
- Location within Iran
- Coordinates: 35°51′58″N 51°37′24″E
- Country: Iran
- Province: Tehran
- County: Shemiranat
- Bakhsh: Lavasanat
- Rural District: Lavasan-e Kuchak
- Elevation: 1,950 m (6,400 ft)

Population (2006)
  - Total: 149
- Time zone: UTC+3:30 (IRST)
  - Summer (DST): UTC+4:30 (IRDT)

Bujan (Persian: بوجان, also Romanized as Būjān) was a village in Lavasan-e Kuchak Rural District, Lavasanat District, Shemiranat County, Tehran Province, Iran. At the 2006 census, its population was 149, in 49 families.
