= Prince Xiang =

Prince Xiang of the First Rank

Chinese name
- Traditional Chinese: 和碩襄親王
- Simplified Chinese: 和硕襄亲王
Transcriptions
Standard Mandarin
- Hanyu Pinyin: héshuò xiāng qīnwáng
- Wade–Giles: ho-shuo hsiang ch'in-wang

Manchu name
- Manchu script: ᡥᠣᡧᠣᡳ ᡨᡠᠰᠠᠩᡤᠠ ᠴᡳᠨ ᠸᠠᠩ
- Romanization: hošoi tusangga cin wang

Prince Xiang of the First Rank, or simply Prince Xiang, was the title of a princely peerage used in China during the Manchu-led Qing dynasty (1644–1912). As the Prince Xiang peerage was not awarded "iron-cap" status, this meant that each successive bearer of the title would normally start off with a title downgraded by one rank vis-à-vis that held by his predecessor. However, the title would generally not be downgraded to any lower than a feng'en fuguo gong except under special circumstances.

The sole bearer of the title was Bombogoor (博穆博果儿; 20 January 1642 – 22 August 1656), Hong Taiji's 11th son, who was named "Prince Xiang of the First Rank" in 1655. Bombogoor died without an heir and had not adopted any children, leaving the peerage extinct. He was honoured with the posthumous name "Prince Xiangzhao of the First Rank" (和硕襄昭亲王, "xiangzhao" meaning "helpful and luminous").
