= Buyan Island =

Coordinates: 47.335967°N 40.376847°E

Buyan Island in the Don River is located near the Bagaevskaya settlement in Rostov Oblast, Russia.

== Legends ==
The local population tells the legend about the Cossack leader Stepan Razin who buried his Persian treasure in 1669-1670 on this island. However, the island appears on the military maps of the Russian Empire, only in the 19th century under different names: Uglovatyi (Angular), Buyinyi (stormy), Buyan. There is no island marked on the maps of the 18th century and this fact causes doubt on the presence of Persian gold at the settlement of Bagaevskaya. The Buyan Island was eventually washed with sand and silt, increasing in size downstream.

== Geography ==
It is covered with dense vegetation, has several sandy estuaries used for swimming, due to its location and is almost always suitable for recreational fishing. The island is stretched along the course of the Don river in the form of an irregular pointed triangle with its base at the upstream and a sharp top near the modern (2017) ferry crossing. The Bagaevskaya settlement and the Buyan Island are divided by the Donok channel (a river arm) which was the main navigable waterway of the Don River until the 20th century. After the construction of the Tsimlyanskaya dam, the spills practically ceased, the river near the village has shallowed, and in the second half of the 20th century navigation on the Don River became impossible, the former Uglovatyi (Angular) river arm became the modern navigable channel of the Don. There are two bridges: a "Cast-iron” bridge for pedestrians and a "Concrete" bridge, constructed in Soviet times for cars. There are the remains of the river pier on the Don side of the island that was functioning until 2008 accepting passenger ships as well. At the pier, there is a rarely working cafe with a bizarre architecture named "At Umar’s".

== Events ==
In 1913, a large robbery of the steamship "Peter" owned by the Rostov magnates Paramonovs took place near the island. The study of teachers of the history of the Bagaev school № 3 Alexander Shaporenko and Alexander Samsonov assumes the probability of flooding of stolen silver near the island in the amount of up to 163,8 kilograms (361.11 pounds). It is relevant to call the Buyan Island as a treasure island thanks to the legend about the treasure of Stepan Razin and the flooded silver of merchants Paramonovs. In 1941-1942, the defense line of the Workers' and Peasants' Red Army was built on the island, however it was, never used by the Soviet troops. The enemy broke through the defense of Soviet troops in July 1942 in the north-east side from the Island.
