= Buyan, Altai Krai =

Buyan Буян
- Selo
- Location within Altai Krai Location within Russia
- Coordinates: 53°49′N 81°00′E
- Country: Russia
- Region: Altai Krai
- District: Krutikhinsky District
- Time zone: UTC+7:00

Buyan (Russian: Буян) is a rural locality (a selo) and the administrative center of Novodubrovsky Selsoviet, Krutikhinsky District, Altai Krai, Russia. The population was 628 as of 2013. There are 5 streets.

== Geography ==
Buyan is located 25 km southwest of Krutikha (the district's administrative centre) by road. Bolshoy Log is the nearest rural locality.
