= Ejei Khan =

Erke Khongghor 額爾克孔果爾 ᠡᠷᠬᠡ ᠬᠣᠩᠭᠣᠷ

Khagan of the Northern Yuan dynasty
- Reign: 1634–1635
- Predecessor: Ligdan Khan
- Successor: Northern Yuan dynasty ended, Hong Taiji as Khan of the Later Jin dynasty

Prince Chahar of the First Rank
- Tenure: 27 May 1636 – 4 March 1641
- Predecessor: Title created
- Successor: Abunai
- Born: Unknown date Mongolian Plateau
- Died: March 4, 1641; Mongolian Plateau
- Wife: Princess Wenzhuang, of the First Rank
Names
- Erke Khongghor (額爾克孔果爾)
- House: Borjigin
- Dynasty: Northern Yuan
- Father: Ligdan Khan

Erke Khongghor (Mongolian: Эрх Хонгор; Chinese: 額爾克孔果爾), alternatively known as Ejei (Mongolian: Эжэй; Chinese: 額哲; pinyin: Ézhé; "Ejei" means "lord" in the Mongolian language), (?–1641) was the last khagan of the Northern Yuan dynasty, ruling briefly from 1634 to 1635. He was the son of Ligdan Khan. The Northern Yuan dynasty, which existed as remnants of the Yuan dynasty retreating north to the Mongolian Plateau after 1368, was defeated by the Later Jin dynasty in 1635 and thus formally came to an end.

== History ==
By the early 17th century, the Borjigin clan had lost nearly all of its power. After his father died in 1634, Ejei and his mother were surrounded by over ten thousand Later Jin cavalry in a surprise attack in February 1635. Weighing their options, Ejei and his mother decided to surrender and was said to have given the imperial seal of the Yuan dynasty to Hong Taiji. In 1636, Hong Taiji, who inherited the title of Great Khan, formally proclaimed the Qing dynasty. Ejei then followed the Qing court's order to ask the remnants of the Mongols still resisting the Qing to lay down their arms and surrender, and he did so successfully. In March, 1636, all resistance ceased and Mongol chieftains from a total of sixteen clans and forty-nine subclans gathered at Mukden, gave their allegiance to Hong Taiji, officially marking the end of the rule of the Borjigin clan. For his contribution, Ejei was awarded the rank of Prince (Qin Wang, 親王), a title he held until his death in 1641, and inherited by his younger brother Abunai (阿布奈).

Abunai (阿布奈) openly showed his discontent toward the Qing dynasty and he was put under house arrest in Shenyang by the Kangxi Emperor in 1669 and his imperial title/rank was given to his son Borni (布尔尼) in September of that same year. Borni (布尔尼) was careful to not show any sign of disrespecting the Qing dynasty, but finally in 1675, he suddenly rebelled along with his younger brother Lubuzung (罗布藏), capitalizing on the Revolt of the Three Feudatories. However, they had made a serious miscalculation in wrongfully believing that other Mongols would join them, when in reality only three thousand Chahar Mongols joined the rebellion. It only took a single decisive battle on April 20, 1675 to defeat Abunai (阿布奈) and his followers, who were all killed subsequently in their retreat. The Qing dynasty's punishment of the rebellion was very harsh: all royal males of Chahars were executed, including infants born to Qing princesses, and all royal females of Chahars were sold to slavery except these Qing princesses.

== Family ==
Consorts and their respective issue(s):

- Princess Consort Chahar of the First Rank of the Aisin-Gioro clan (固倫溫莊公主 愛新覺羅氏; 10 September 1625 – April/May 1663), personal name Makata (馬喀塔)
- Unknown
  - Lady Khorchin Borjigin (博爾濟吉特氏), 1st daughter
    - Married Fushou (富綬) of the Aisin Gioro clan, 4th son of Hooge, Prince Su

== In popular culture ==
- Portrayed by Liu Xueyi in 2015 TV series The Legend of Xiaozhuang.

== See also ==
- List of khans of the Northern Yuan dynasty
- Draft History of Qing

Ejei Khan House of Borjigin (1206–1635) Died: 1661
Regnal titles
Preceded by Ligdan Khan	Khagan of the Northern Yuan dynasty 1634–1635	Succeeded by None (title abolished, territories of the Chahars absorbed into the Qing Empire)
