= Buyan Sechen Khan =

Sechen Khan Буян Сэцэн хаан ᠰᠡᠴᠡᠨ ᠬᠠᠭᠠᠨ
- Khagan of the Mongols
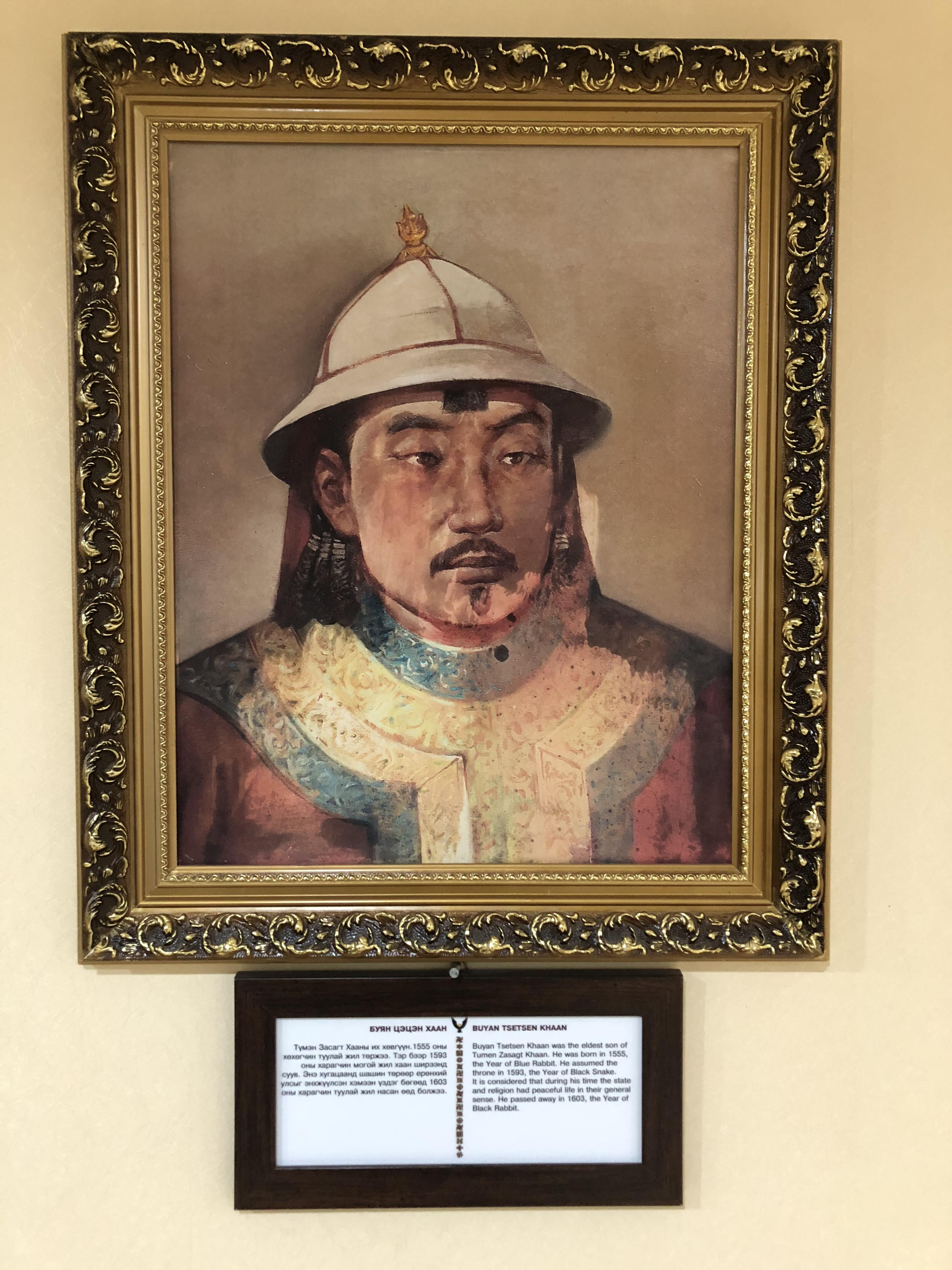

Khagan of the Northern Yuan dynasty
- Reign: 1592–1604
- Predecessor: Jasaghtu Khan
- Successor: Ligden Khan
- Born: 1556
- Died: 1604 (aged 47–48)
Full name
- Given name: Buyan (Буян)
Era dates
- 1592–1604
- House: Borjigin (Боржигин)
- Dynasty: Northern Yuan
- Father: Jasaghtu Khan

Sechen Khan (Mongolian: Цэцэн Хаан; Chinese: 徹辰汗), born Buyan (Mongolian: Буян; Chinese: 布延), (1556–1604) was a khagan of the Northern Yuan dynasty, reigning from 1592 to 1604. He was the eldest son of Jasaghtu Khan whom he succeeded.

== Reign ==
During Buyan Khan’s rule, the Northern Yuan dynasty once again fell into disarray. Although the Great Khan was recognized as the leader of all the Mongol tribes, this was in name only. Buyan Khan even attempted to show what was rumored to be the Imperial Seal of Genghis Khan to other Mongol clans to legitimatize his rule. He ruled the people in accordance with justice and religion.

He died in 1604.

== See also ==
- List of khans of the Northern Yuan dynasty

Buyan Sechen Khan House of Borjigin Died: 1592-1604
Regnal titles
Preceded by Tümen Jasagtu Khan	Khagan of the Northern Yuan dynasty 1592–1604	Succeeded by Ligdan Khan
