= Chahars =

Subgroup of the Mongols

Chahar Mongols
- Territories of the Eight Banners of Chahar in 1911

Regions with significant populations
- China: 299,000 (1987)
- Mongolia: 4730 (2026)

Languages
- Chakhar Mongolian

Religion
- Predominantly Tibetan Buddhism

Related ethnic groups
- Mongols, Mongols in China, Bortala Mongols and Dariganga Mongols

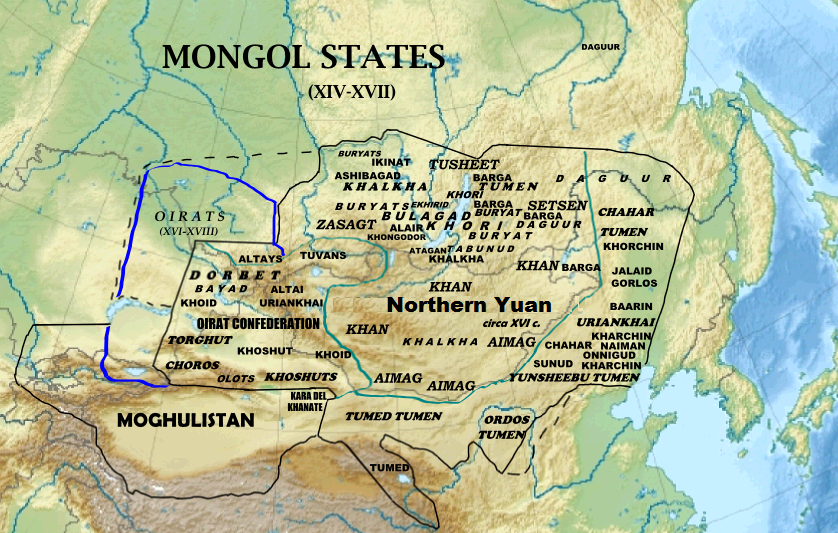
Location of the Chahars in the northeast during the 16th century

The Chahars (Mongolian: ᠴᠠᠬᠠᠷ; simplified Chinese: 察哈尔部; traditional Chinese: 察哈爾部) are a subgroup of Mongols that speak Chakhar Mongolian and predominantly live in southeastern Inner Mongolia, China.

The Chahars were originally one of estates of Kublai Khan located around Jingzhao (now Xi'an). They moved from Shaanxi to southeastern region controlled by the Northern Yuan dynasty based in the Mongolian Plateau in the 15th century. The Chahar became a tumen of six tumen Mongols under Dayan Khan and were led by his successors, thus becoming personal appanage of the Northern Yuan monarchs.

Oppressed by Altan Khan, the Chahars, led by Daraisung Guden Khan, moved eastward onto the Liao River in the middle of the 16th century. In the early 17th century Ligdan Khan made an expedition to the west because of pressure from the Manchu people (early named Jurchen). When he died in Gansu on his way to Tibet, his son, Ejei, surrendered to the Manchu Later Jin dynasty in 1635 and was given the title of Prince (Chinese: 親王) and Inner Mongolian nobility became closely tied to the Qing royal family and intermarried with them extensively. Ejei Khan died in 1641 and was succeeded by his brother Abunai.

The Chahar royal family kept favorable relations with the Qing imperial family until Makata gege, who was a daughter of Hong Taiji and married to the Chahar Mongol prince, died in 1663. After Abunai showed disaffection with Manchu Qing rule, he was placed under house arrest in 1669 in Shenyang and the Kangxi Emperor gave his title to his son Borni. Abunai then bid his time and then he and his brother Lubuzung revolted against the Qing in 1675 during the Revolt of the Three Feudatories, with 3000 Chahar Mongol followers joining in on the revolt.

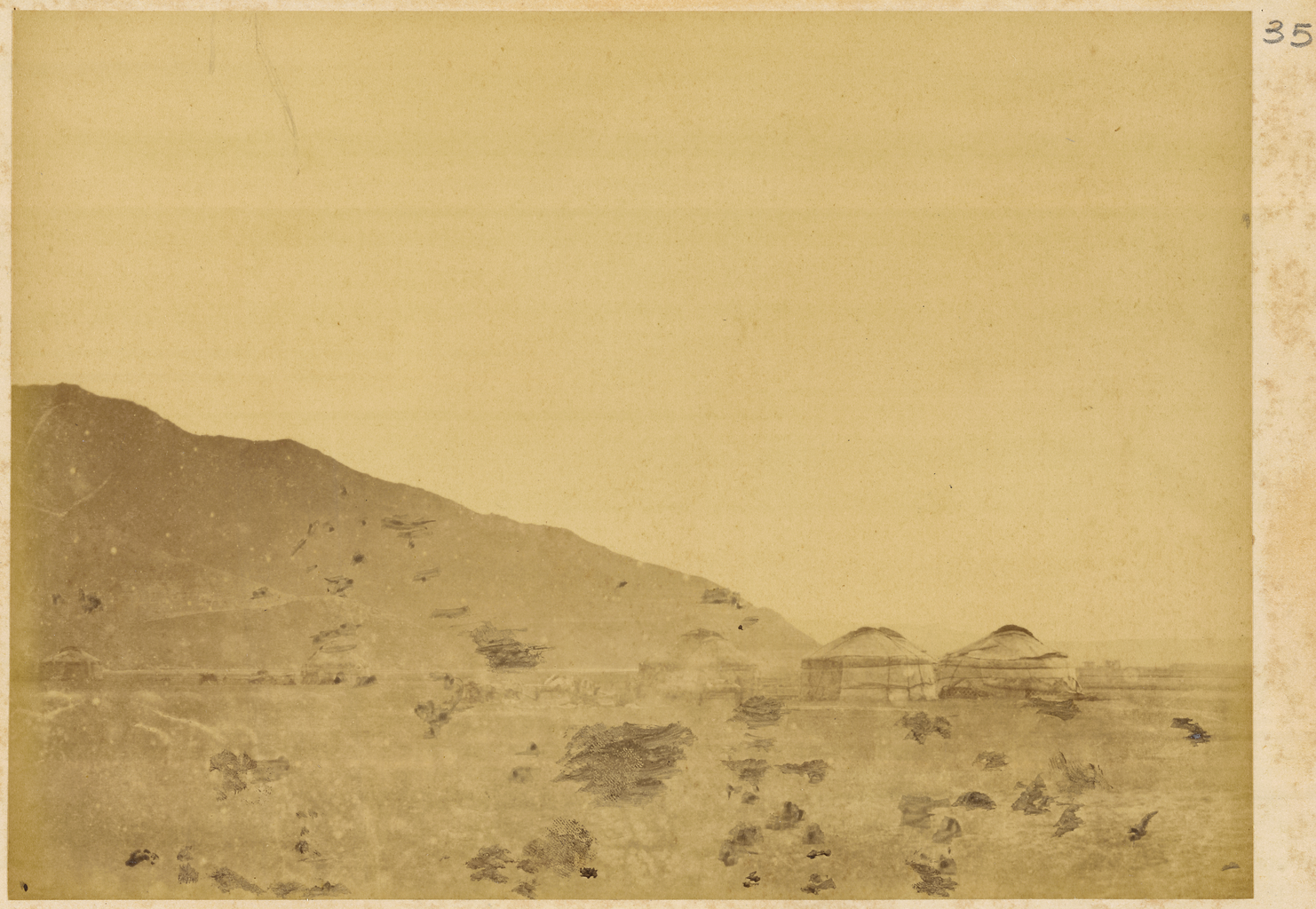
Yurts of the Nomadic Chahar People. Inner Mongolia, China, 1874.

The revolt was put down within two months; the Qing then crushed the rebels in a battle on April 20, 1675, killing Abunai and all his followers. Their title was abolished, all Chahar Mongol royal males were executed even if they were born to Manchu Qing princesses, and all Chahar Mongol royal females were sold into slavery except the Manchu Qing princesses. As a result of the rebellion, the Chahar Mongols were reorganized into the Eight Banners of Chahar, an administrative system resembling the imperial Eight Banners system, and moved to around Zhangjiakou. The Chahar Eight Banners did not belong to a league but were directly controlled by the Emperor. The Qing authorities resettled some of their population from the suburbs of Hohhot and Dolon Nor to the Ili River after the fall of the Dzungar Khanate in c. 1758. They were largely mixed with the Dzungar people and Torghut of the region.

When Outer Mongolia declared its independence from the Qing in 1911, 100 households under former vice-governor Sumya fled from Xinjiang via the Russian border to Mongolia. They were resettled by the Khalkha in the west of Kyakhta. Sumiya and his Tsahars contributed to the revolution of 1921. They are known as the Selenge's Tsahar since settled in Selenge.

Many of the Chinese troops during the occupation of Mongolia in 1919 were Chahar Mongols, which has been a major cause for animosity between Khalkhas and Inner Mongols.

== See also ==
- Chahar Province, one of the provinces of China from 1912 to 1936.
- Mongols in China
- Northern Yuan dynasty
- Administrative divisions of Mongolia during Qing dynasty
- Chahar, a tribe in Afghanistan
