= List of wars involving Mongol states (pre–1911) =

Since the foundation of the Mongol Empire in the 13th century, Mongol states have fought many wars. For wars fought by the modern country Mongolia following its initial independence in 1911, see List of wars involving Mongolia.

Mongolian victory

Line 9:

== Mongol Empire ==
This section contains list of wars involving Mongol Empire.

Date	Conflict	Combatant 1	Combatant 2	Result
1187	Battle of Dalan Balzhat	Genghis Khan	Jamukha	Genghis Khan defeat
1204	Battle of Chakirmaut	Genghis Khan	Jamukha	Genghis Khan victory
1201–1308	Mongol campaigns in Siberia	Mongol Empire	Various Siberian tribes	Victory
1205–1210	Mongol conquest of Western Xia	Mongol Empire	Western Xia	Victory
1206–1368	Mongol invasions and conquests	Mongol Empire	Multiple kingdoms and dynasties	Victory
1206–1368	Mongol campaigns in Central Asia	Mongol Empire	Khwarazmian Empire	Victory
1209	Mongol invasion of the Kingdom of Qocho	Mongol Empire	Kingdom of Qocho	Victory
1211–1234	Mongol conquest of the Jin dynasty	Mongol Empire	Jin dynasty	Victory
1216–1218	Mongol conquest of the Qara Khitai	Mongol Empire	Qara Khitai	Victory
1217, 1222–1233	Mongol conquest of Eastern Xia	Mongol Empire	Eastern Xia	Victory
1219–1258	Mongol conquest of Persia and Mesopotamia	Mongol Empire	Khwarazmian Empire, Abbasid Caliphate, Nizari Ismaili state	Victory
1219–1221	Mongol invasion of the Khwarazmian Empire	Mongol Empire	Khwarazmian Empire	Victory
1218	First Kyrgyz Revolt against Mongol Empire	Mongol Empire	Kyrgyz states	Victory: Leader of revolt Kurlun executed; Thousands of Kyrgyz people massacred
1220–1221	Mongol invasion of Khorasan	Mongol Empire	Khwarazmian Empire	Victory
1220–1223	The Mongol conquest of Cumania	Mongol Empire	Kipchaks	Victory
1220–1238	Mongol invasions of Georgia	Mongol Empire	Kingdom of Georgia	Victory
1220-1231	Mongol invasions of Azerbaijan	Mongol Empire	Atabegs of Azerbaijan	Victory
1220–1236	Mongol invasions of Armenia	Mongol Empire	Armenian Kingdom of Cilicia	Victory
1221–1225	First Mongol invasions of India	Mongol Empire	Punjab; Sindh; Kerman	Defeat
1223–1240	Mongol invasion of Kievan Rus'	Mongol Empire	Vladimir-Suzdal; Kingdom of Galicia–Volhynia; Novgorod Republic; Smolensk; Rostov; Chernigov; Ryazan; Pereyaslavl	Victory: Establishment of the Golden Horde
1223–1236	The Mongol invasion of Volga Bulgaria	Mongol Empire	Volga Bulgaria	Victory
1225–1227	Punitive expedition in Western Xia	Mongol Empire	Western Xia	Victory
1227	1227 Incident	Mongol Empire	Jin Dynasty: Western Xia; Song Dynasty	Mongols ravaged: Jie (階); Feng (鳳); Cheng (成); He (和); Tianshui (天水); Wenzhou(文州) prefectures
1231	First Mongol invasion of Korea	Mongol Empire	Kingdom of Goryeo	Victory
1232	Second Mongol invasion of Korea	Mongol Empire	Kingdom of Goryeo	Defeat
1235–1239	Third Mongol invasion of Korea	Mongol Empire	Kingdom of Goryeo	Victory
1240–1241	Mongol invasion of Tibet	Mongol Empire	Tibet	Victory
1235–1279	Mongol conquest of Song China	Mongol Empire	Song dynasty	Victory
1235–1241	Mongol conquest of Kashmir	Mongol Empire	Kashmir; Deli Sultanate	Defeat
1237–1253	First Mongol invasions of Durdzuketi	Mongol Empire	Chechens; Ingush; Ossetians; Lezgins; Avars; Alans	Victory
1237–1253	Mongol invasion of Circassia	Mongol Empire	Circassians	Defeat
1240–1241	First Mongol invasion of Poland	Mongol Empire	Kingdom of Poland; Knights Templar; Teutonic Knights; Knights Hospitaller	Victory
1241–1242	Mongol invasion of Moldavia and Wallachia	Mongol Empire	Moldavia and Wallachia	Victory
1241–1243	Mongol invasion of Anatolia	Mongol Empire	Sultanate of Rum; Georgian auxiliaries Trapezuntine auxiliaries Latin mercenaries	Victory
1242	First Mongol invasion of Hungary	Mongol Empire	Kingdom of Hungary	Victory
1242	Mongol invasion of the Bulgaria	Mongol Empire	Second Bulgarian Empire	Victory
1242	Mongol invasion of Serbia	Mongol Empire	Serbia	Victory
1242	Fourth Mongol invasion of Korea	Mongol Empire	Kingdom of Goryeo	Victory
1253	Mongolian conquest of Dali Kingdom	Mongol Empire	Dali Kingdom	Victory
1253–1256	Mongol campaign against the Nizaris	Mongol Empire	Nizari Ismailis (Assassins)	Victory: Destruction of key fortresses including Alamut Castle; End of the Nizari state in Persia
1254–1255	Kashmir uprising	Mongol Empire	Kashmir rebels	Uprising crushed
1255	Fifth the Mongol invasion of Korea	Mongol Empire	Kingdom of Goryeo	Victory
1258	Mongol invasion of Iraq	Mongol Empire	Abbasid Iraq	Victory
1257–1258	First Mongol invasion of Delhi Sultanate	Mongol Empire	Delhi Sultanate	Peaceful agreement
1257–1258	Dai Viet-Mongol War	Mongol Empire	Tran Dynasty; Champa	Defeat
1258	Sixth Mongol invasion of Korea	Mongol Empire	Kingdom of Goryeo	Peaceful agreement
1260	Mongol invasions of the Levant	Ilkhanate of the Mongol Empire; Kingdom of England; Knights Templar; Golden Horde of the Mongol Empire (1259–1264)	Mamluk Sultanate; Ayyubids; Golden Horde of the Mongol Empire (after 1264); Karamanid rebels Abbasid Caliphate	Mongol victory over the Abbasids, Ayyubids and Nizaris; Mamluk victory over the Mongols; Treaty of Aleppo
1261	2nd Kyrgyz Revolt against Mongol Empire	Mongol Empire	Kem-Kemjiut state	Victory
1274	First Mongol invasion of Japan	Mongol Empire	Kamakura Japan	Defeat
1264	Mongol invasions of Sakhalin	Mongol Empire	Sakhalin Ainu	Victory
1281	Second Mongol invasion of Japan	Mongol Empire	Kamakura Japan	Defeat
1293–1298	Second Mongol invasion of Delhi Sultanate	Mongol Empire	Delhi Sultanate	Defeat

== Yuan Dynasty ==
This section contains list of wars involving the Yuan Dynasty

Date	Conflict	Combatant 1	Combatant 2	Result
1260–1264	Toluid Civil War	Kublai Khan's forces	Ariq Böke's forces	Kublai Victory
1268–1301	Kaidu–Kublai war	Yuan dynasty Ilkhanate	Chagatai Khanate; Golden Horde	Inconclusive
1270–1273	Sambyeolcho Rebellion	Yuan dynasty	Sambyeolcho army	Victory
1277–1278	First Mongol invasion of Burma	Yuan dynasty	Pagan Empire	Victory
1282–1284	The Mongol invasion of Champa	Yuan dynasty	Champa	Defeat
1285	Dai Viet-Mongol War	Yuan dynasty	Tran dynasty	Defeat
1287–1288	Third Mongol invasion of Vietnam	Yuan dynasty	Tran dynasty	Defeat
1287–1288	Mongol invasion of Java	Yuan dynasty	Majapahit Empire; Kingdom of Singhasari; Kediri Kingdom	Defeat
1300–1301	Second Mongol invasion of Burma	Yuan Dynasty	Myinsaing Kingdom	Defeat
1314–1318	Esen Buqa–Ayurbarwada war	Yuan dynasty Ilkhanate	Chagatai Khanate; Golden Horde	Victory
1328–1332	War of the Two Capitals	Khanbaliq forces	Shangdu forces	Khanbaliq Victory
1351–1368	Red Turban Rebellion	Yuan dynasty	Red Turban Army	Defeat: Destruction of the Yuan dynasty

== Post-imperial Mongolia ==
This section contains list of wars involving different post-imperial Mongolian states (Northern Yuan Dynasty, Tumed Mongols, Chahar Mongols, Four Oirat and more)

Date	Conflict	Combatant 1	Combatant 2	Result
1381–1382	Ming conquest of Yunnan	Northern yuan	Ming Dynasty	Defeat
1388–1690	Oirat–Khalkha wars	Northern Yuan	Four Oirat	Inconclusive
1399	Oirat secession from Northern Yuan	Northern Yuan	Four Oirat	Oirat Victory: Creation of a Western Mongolian state
1409–1424	Yongle Emperor's campaigns against the Mongols	Northern Yuan	Ming Dynasty	Defeat
1449	Tumu Crisis	Four Oirat	Ming Dynasty	Victory
1449	Defense of Beijing	Four Oirat	Ming Dynasty	Inconclusive: Oirats successfully traded emperor Yingzong for valuables
1455	Fourth Oirat–Khalkha War	Northern Yuan	Four Oirat	Khalkha Victory
1457	Oirat–Uzbek War	Four Oirat	Uzbek Khanate	Oirat Victory
1469	Oirat–Moghul War	Four Oirat	(Chagatai Khanate) Moghulistan	Oirat Victory
1479–1510	Dayan khan's Unification of Mongolia	Dayan Khan coalition	Various Taishis	Yuan Victory: Unification of the Mongols
1500–1501	Raid Dayan Khan on Ningxia	Northern Yuan	Ming Dynasty	Defeat
1501–1507	Northern Yuan-Ming Dynasty War	Northern Yuan	Ming Dynasty	Victory
1507	Altan Khan's campaigns against Oirats	Tumed Mongols	Four Oirat	Tumed Victory: Expulsion of the Oirats
1529–1542	Altan Khan's Raid on Ming China	Tumed Mongols	Ming Dynasty	Tumed Victory: Plunder & livestock taken
1529–1571	Dayan Khans raid on Ming Dynasty	Northern Yuan	Ming Dynasty	Northern yuan victory: Ming and Northern Yuan signs peace treaty
1530's–1616	Kazakh–Oirat Wars	Oirat remnants	Kazakh Khanate	Victory
1538	Uriankhai uprising	Northern Yuan	Tuvans	Revolt suppressed
1542	Dayan Khan deathbed clash with Chinese troops	Northern Yuan	Ming Dynasty	Victory
1542–1547	Tumed-Chahar War	Tumed Mongols	Chahar Mongols	Tumed Victory: Altan becomes de facto leader of the Right Wing
1550	Siege of Beijing	Tumed Mongols	Ming Dynasty	Tumed Victory: More than 60% of city burned; Forced peace treaty between Ming and Mongols; Capture of many valuables such as horse, silk and gold
1550's–1560's	Ming–Tumed Border Conflict	Tumed Mongols	Ming Dynasty	Peace negotiations
1560's	Haqnazar's invasion of Moghulistan: Oirat Intervention	Oirat Khanate (Chagatai Khanate) Moghulistan	Kazakh Khanate	Victory
1582	Kara Khula's Rebellion against Khalkhas	Northern Yuan	Oirat remnants	Oirat Victory
1600–1635	Chahar-Jurchen War	Chahar Mongols	Later Jin	Defeat: Fall of Northern Yuan
1604–1623	Oirat War of Independence	Northern Yuan; Kazakh Khanate	Oirat remnants	Oirat Victory: Oirats declare Independence
1688	Russian invasion to Lake Baikal, Buryat lands	Khalkha Mongols: Tüsheet Khan	Tsardom of Russia	Defeat: Russian conquest of Buryatia

== Dzungar Khanate ==
This section contains list of wars involving Dzungar Khanate.

Date	Conflict	Combatant 1	Combatant 2	Result
17th Century–18th Century	Dzungar–Russian conflicts	Dzungar Khanate	Tsardom of Russia	Victory
1635–1658	First Kazakh–Dzungar War	Dzungar Khanate; Khoshut Khanate	Kazakh Khanate Khanate of Bukhara	Victory: Salqam Jangir Khan captured and later Killed; Annexation of Jetisu; Border of Kazakh Khanate and Dzungar Khanate set from Ayagoz river to the Talas river
1637–1641	Dzungar–Khoshut campaigns on Tibet	Dzungar Khanate; Khoshut Khanate	Choghtu Mongols	Victory
1665–1667	Invasion of Yenisei	Dzungar Khanate	Tsardom of Russia; Altan Khanate	Victory
1653–1661	Dzungar war of Succession	Sengge's forces	Sengge's half brothers' forces	Sengge Victory
1670–1671	Galdan's ascension to the Throne	Galdan's forces	Chechen Tayiji and Zotov Batur's forces	Galdan Victory
1677	Ochirtu-Galdan Conflict	Dzungar Khanate	Khoshut Khanate	Victory
1678–1680	Dzungar conquest of Altishahr	Dzungar Khanate	Yarkent Khanate	Victory
1681–1686	Second Kazakh–Dzungar War	Dzungar Khanate	Kazakh Khanate	Victory
1687–1689	Galdan’s Invasion of Khalkha	Dzungar Khanate	Northern Yuan	Victory: Annexation of Outer Mongolia; Later descends to Dzungar-Qing Wars
1690-1697	First Dzungar–Qing War	Dzungar Khanate	Qing Dynasty	Defeat
1693–1705	Chagatai rebellion	Dzungar Khanate	Yarkent Khanate	Victory
1698–1700	Third Kazakh–Dzungar War	Dzungar Khanate	Kazakh Khanate	Victory
1709–1710	Invasion of Southern Siberia	Dzungar Khanate	Tsardom of Russia	Victory
1708–1712	War of 1708–1712	Dzungar Khanate	Kazakh Khanate	Defeat
1714–1718	Fourth Kazakh–Dzungar War	Dzungar Khanate	Kazakh Khanate	Disputed
1714–1720	Second Dzungar–Qing War	Dzungar Khanate	Khoshut Khanate; Qing Dynasty	Defeat
1715–1716	Bucholz's expedition	Dzungar Khanate	Tsardom of Russia	Victory
1717	Capture of Tibet	Dzungar Khanate	Khoshut Khanate; Qing Dynasty	Victory: Lha-bzang Khan killed
1719–1720	Likharev's expedition	Dzungar Khanate	Tsardom of Russia	Victory
1720	Chinese expedition to Tibet (1720)	Dzungar Khanate	Qing Dynasty	Defeat
1723–1730	Fifth Kazakh-Dzungar Wars	Dzungar Khanate	Kazakh Khanate	Initial victory, later defeat
1728–1739	Third Dzungar–Qing War	Dzungar Khanate	Qing Dynasty	Peaceful Agreement
1732	Dzungar campaign against the Kazakhs	Dzungar Khanate	Kazakh Khanate	Victory
1739–1741	Sixth Kazakh–Dzungar Wars	Dzungar Khanate	Kazakh Khanate	Victory
1755–1757	Dzungar-Qing War: Amursuna rebellion	Dzungar Khanate	Qing Dynasty	Defeat
1755–1759	Ten Great Campaigns genocide of the Dzungars	Dzungar Khanate	Qing Dynasty	Defeat: Destruction of the Dzungar Khanate; Dzungar genocide
