= Kharkhul =

Oirat prince (died 1634)

Khara Khula (Chinese: 哈喇忽剌; died 1634) was a Choros prince and taishi of the Choros tribe. He is best known for forming and leading a coalition of the Four Oirats in battle against Ubashi Khong Tayiji, the Khalkha prince who ruled the Altan Khanate in present-day northwest Mongolia.

== Background ==
At the beginning of the 17th century, the Oirat tribes were roaming the pastureland between the Irtysh and the Ili rivers. They were pressured to migrate west to that area from their home in the Altai Mountains by Ubashi Khong Tayiji who was expanding his state by robbing the Oirats of their valuable pastures.

During this era, the Oirat tribes were fragmented along traditional tribal divisions, viz., Choros, Dörbet, Torghut, Khoshut, Khoit, etc. Each tribe had its own hereditary ruler. The tribes constantly competed against each other, profiting at the others' expense, while seeking to maintain their independence. This disunity had plagued the Oirats for 150 years, since the dissolution of the Dörben Oirat state after the murder of Esen Taishi in 1454, and made them an easy opponent for Ubashi Khong Tayiji.

== Life ==
Around 1600, Khara Khula succeeded his father, Bulai (or Abuda Ablai Taishi) as tayishi of the Choros tribe. Although his birth name was "Khutugaitu", his father nicknamed him Khara Khula, the name historians use to identify him. The name describes a lion-like, dark-colored animal from the Altai Mountains that Khutugaitu supposedly killed.

As taishi of the dominant Oirat tribe, Khara Khula emerged from his base in the upper Irtysh river and Tarbagatai Mountains region to take up the cause of the unorganized and confused Oirat tribes in their war against Ubashi Khong Tayiji. In so doing, Khara Khula's objective was to establish the political and military unity that his ancestor Esen Taishi once demanded from the Oirat princes and, in the process, forge a new state.

Early in his reign in 1606, Khara Khula unified and prepared the Oirat tribes for battle. In 1608, the Oirat forces defeated the Kazakhs to their west. By 1609, Khara Khula won a decisive victory against Ubashi Khong Tayiji, forcing the Altan Khanate to withdraw from Oirat territory in the Kobdo region of present-day northwest Mongolia. But the unity would soon dissolve after the victory, as some Oirat princes, no longer fearing the Ubasi Khun Tayishi, resumed their traditional nomadic ways, favoring independence over centralization.

The string of victories emboldened Khara Khula to take control of the salt mines near the Russian outpost at Tara in 1610 and demand a fee in exchange for the salt from the neighboring Cossacks and Siberian nomads. The Cossacks chose instead to retaliate, attacking the Oirats. The clashes continued until 1613, when Russian settlers discovered an alternative source of salt at Lake Yamysh. But this lake was located in Dzungar territory and would be the source of clashes between the Cossacks and the Oirats over the next 20 years.

The Oirats also contended with natural disaster when the severe winter of 1614 killed off livestock, further weakening their position. Then, Ubashi Khong Tayiji, who had sufficiently recovered from his earlier defeat, undertook a second assault, reversing the Oirat victories and, in 1615, winning a major victory against the Oirats. The loss caused a number of Oirat princes to submit themselves as vassals to the Altan Khanate. Other Oirat princes fled north into southern Siberia seeking the protection of Russia, while still others sought refuge with the Kazakhs.

Through the mid-1620s, Ubashi Khong Tayiji continued to annex Oirat land while handed the forces of Khara Khula defeat after defeat, including several major losses. The situation did not reverse itself until Khara Khula solidified his base support and began launching counter-attacks, culminating in the death of Ubashi Khong Tayiji around 1627. From that point forward, Khara Khula managed to regain the Oirat lands that Ubashi Khong Tayiji had taken for the Altan Khanate. Ubashi's son and successor, Badma Erdeni Khong Tayiji, was not able to duplicate his father's success and therefore did not pose a threat to the Oirats.

As Khara Khula's power and prestige grew from his victories over the Altan Khanate, the Oirat princes felt his dominance over them, particularly the Torghut tribe whose leaders wished to maintain the freedoms they once enjoyed without a central political figure. To that end, the Torghuts migrated from their encampments in southern Siberia to the pasture lands off the Volga river in southwestern Russia. The move eased the population and livestock pressures on the pastures of southern Siberia and further enabled Khara Khula's son, Erdeni Batur, to forge the remaining Oirat tribes into a new Oirat state, called the Dzungar Khanate, shortly after his father's death in 1634.

Kharkhul House of Choros (the 14th century-1755) Died: 1634
Regnal titles
Preceded by Abuda Ablai Tayishi	Khong Tayiji of the Dzungar Khanate ?–1634	Succeeded by Erdeni Batur
