= Russian conquest of Siberia =

Military conquest during 1580–1778

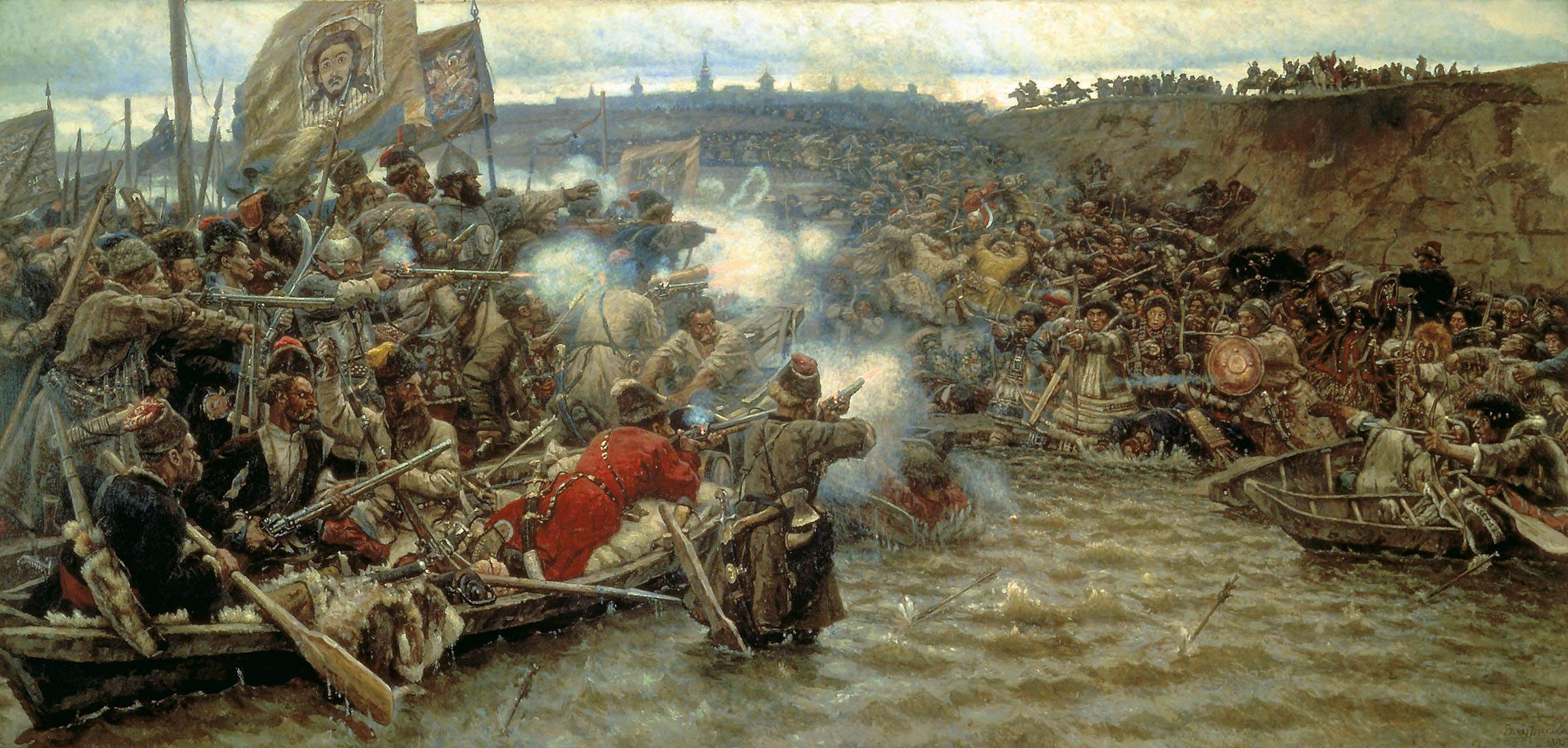
- Yermak's Conquest of Siberia, a painting by Vasily Surikov
Date	1580–1778 (198 years)
Location	Siberia
Result	Russian victory
Territorial changes	Dissolution and annexation of the Sibir Khanate; The territory between the Ural Mountains and the Pacific Ocean falls under the control of Russia

Belligerents
Tsardom of Russia (before 1721); Russian Empire (after 1721); Don Cossacks; Allied Indigenous Siberians	Khanate of Sibir (until 1598); Daurs; Yakuts; Koryaks; Chukchis; Buryats; Jaxa; Qing Empire (1652–1689); Dzungar Khanate (1665–1720); Other native peoples of Siberia

Commanders and leaders
Yermak Timofeyevich †; Pyotr Beketov; Vladimir Atlasov; Andrey Voyeykov; Ivan Moskvitin; Yerofey Khabarov; Vassili Poyarkov; Dmitry Pavlutsky †	(Khanate of Sibir) Kuchum Khan; Tygyn Darkhan (POW); Daur prince Guigudar; Nicefor Czernichowski

The Russian conquest of Siberia took place between 1581 and 1778, when the Khanate of Sibir became a loose political structure of vassalages that were being undermined by the activities of Russian explorers. Although outnumbered, the Russians pressured the various family-based tribes into changing their loyalties and establishing distant forts from which they conducted raids. It is traditionally considered that Yermak Timofeyevich's campaign against the Siberian Khanate began in 1581. The annexation of Siberia and the Far East to Russia was resisted by local residents and took place against the backdrop of fierce battles between the indigenous peoples of Siberia and the Russian Cossacks, who often committed atrocities against indigenous Siberians. The conquest of the region was a spontaneous event organized by a group of adventurers; it is one of the early European colonial campaigns.

== Conquest of the Khanate of Sibir ==
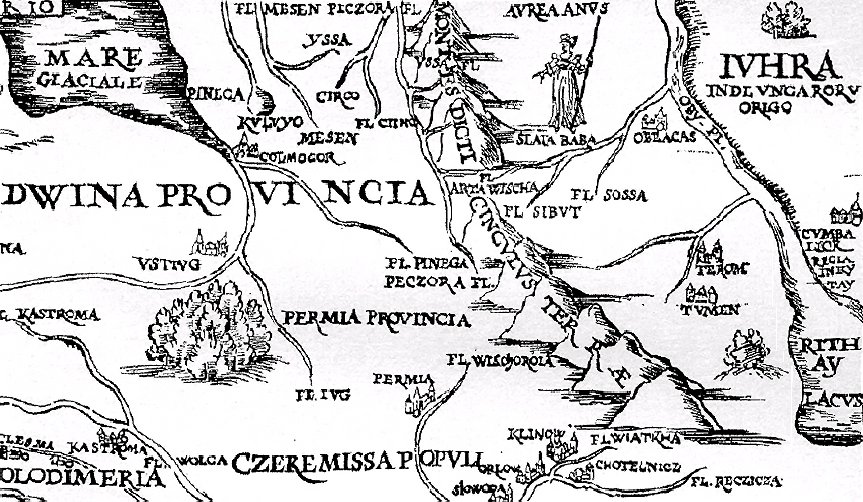
1549 map of the region, in upper-right hand corner depicted Yugra (IVHRA, Homeland of the Hungarians) (located within Siberia before its unification with Russia)

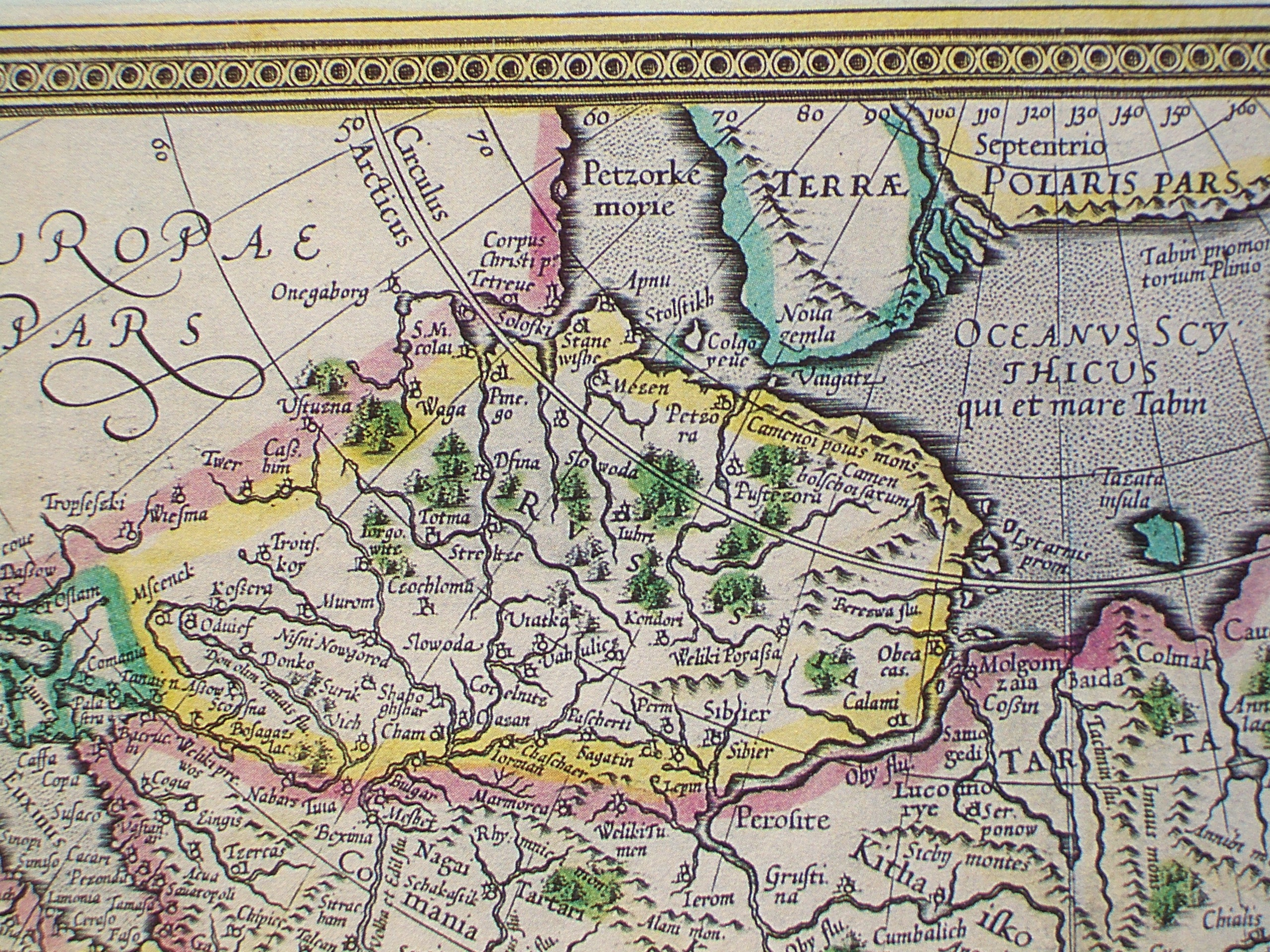
1595 map of Russia (yellow borders)

The Russian conquest of Siberia began in July 1581 when some 540 Cossacks under Yermak Timofeyevich invaded the territory of the Voguls, subjects to Kuchum Khan, ruler of the Sibir Khanate. They were accompanied by some Lithuanian and German mercenaries and prisoners of war. Throughout 1581, this force traversed the territory known as Yugra and subdued Vogul and Ostyaks towns. At this time, they also captured a tax collector of Kuchum Khan.

Following a series of Tatar raids in retaliation against the Russian advance, Yermak's forces prepared for a campaign to take Qashliq, the Siberian capital. The force embarked in May 1582. After a three-day battle on the banks of the Irtysh River, Yermak was victorious against a combined force of Kuchum Khan and six allied Tatar princes. On 29 June, the Cossack forces were attacked by the Tatars but again repelled them.

Throughout September 1582, the Khan gathered his forces for a defense of Qashliq. A horde of Siberian Tatars, Voguls, and Ostyaks massed at Mount Chyuvash to defend against invading Cossacks. On 1 October, a Cossack attempt to storm the Tatar fort at Mount Chyuvash was held off. On 23 October, the Cossacks attempted to storm the Tatar fort at Mount Chyuvash for a fourth time when the Tatars counterattacked. More than a hundred Cossacks were killed, but their gunfire forced a Tatar retreat and allowed the capture of two Tatar cannons. The forces of the Khan retreated, and Yermak entered Qashliq on 26 October.

Kuchum Khan retreated into the steppes and over the next few years regrouped his forces. He suddenly attacked Yermak on 6 August 1584 in the dead of night and defeated most of his army. The details are disputed with Russian sources claiming Yermak was wounded and tried to escape by swimming across the Wagay River which is a tributary of the Irtysh River, but drowned under the weight of his own chain mail. The remains of Yermak's forces under the command of Mescheryak retreated from Qashliq, destroying the city as they left. In 1586, the Russians returned, and after subduing the Khanty and Mansi people through the use of their artillery they established a fortress at Tyumen close to the ruins of Qashliq. The Tatar tribes that were submissive to Kuchum Khan suffered from several attacks by the Russians between 1584 and 1595; however, Kuchum Khan would not be caught. Finally, in August 1598, Kuchum Khan was defeated at the Battle of Irmen near the Ob River. In the course of the fight, the Siberian royal family was captured by the Russians. However, Kuchum Khan escaped yet again. The Russians took the family members of Kuchum Khan to Moscow and there they remained as hostages. The descendants of the khan's family became known as the Princes Sibirsky and the family is known to have survived until at least the late 19th century.

Despite his personal escape, the capture of his family ended the political and military activities of Kuchum Khan and he retreated to the territories of the Nogai Horde in southern Siberia. He had been in contact with the tsar and had requested that a small region on the banks of the Irtysh River would be granted as his dominion. This was rejected by the tsar who proposed to Küçüm Khan that he come to Moscow and "comfort himself" in the service of the tsar. However, the old khan did not want to suffer from such contempt and preferred staying in his own lands to "comforting himself" in Moscow. Kuchum Khan then went to Bukhara and as an old man became blind, dying in exile with distant relatives sometime around 1605.

== Conquest and exploration ==
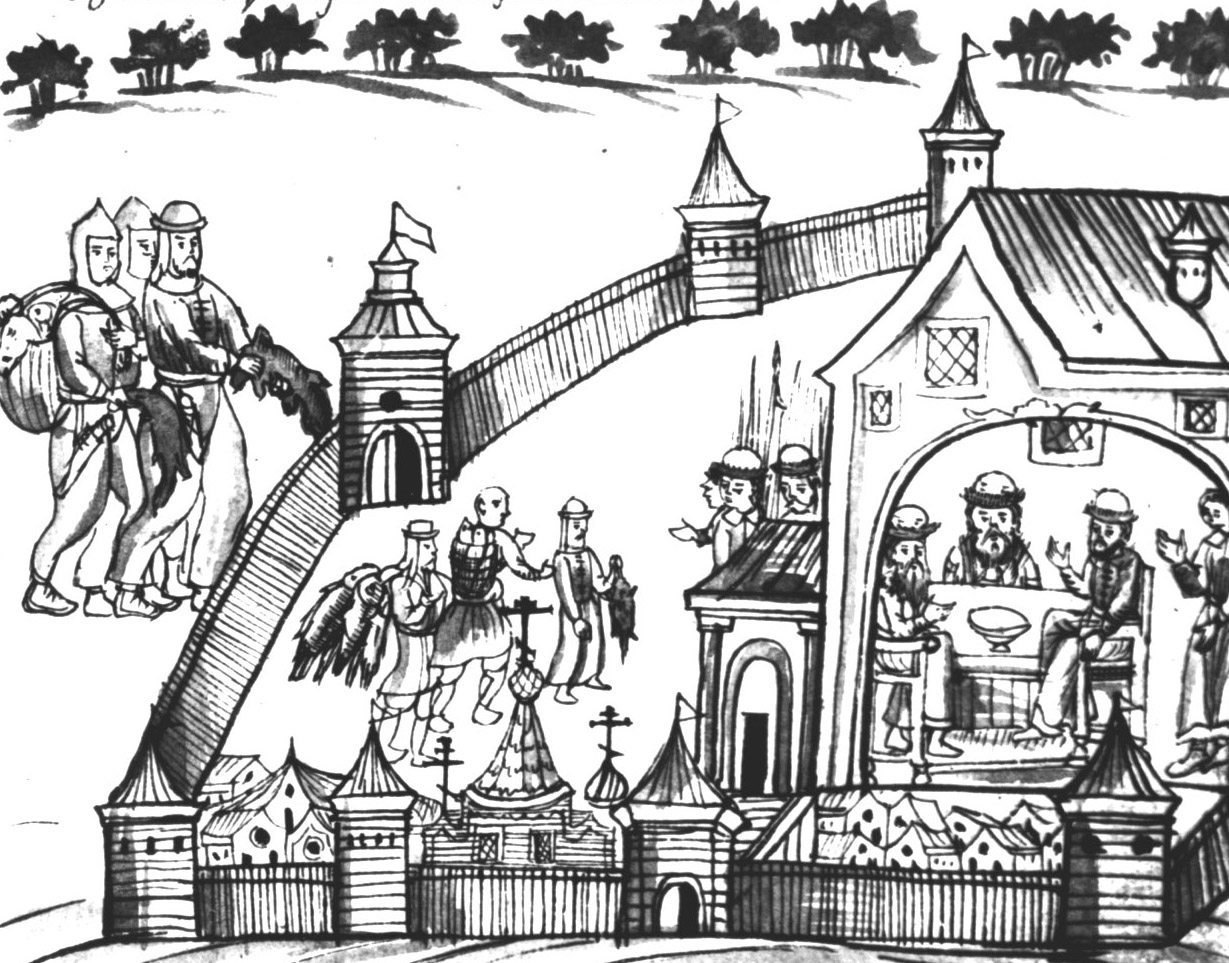
Muscovite voevodas in the new-built fortress of Tyumen, from the Remezov Chronicle.

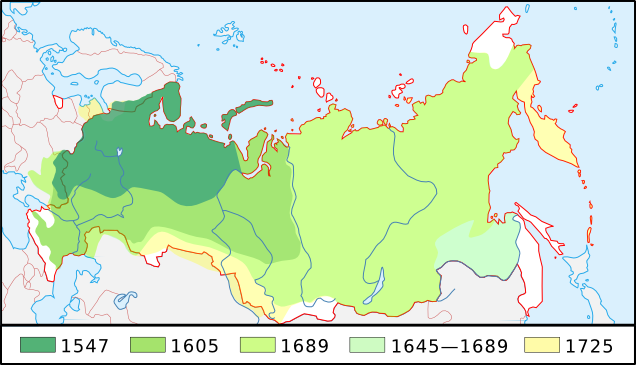
Growth of the Tsardom of Russia

In order to subjugate the natives and collect yasak (fur tribute), a series of winter outposts (zimovie) and forts (ostrogs) were built at the confluences of major rivers and streams and important portages. The first among these were Tyumen and Tobolsk—the former built in 1586 by Vasily Sukin and Ivan Myasnoy, and the latter the following year by Danilo Chulkov. Tobolsk would become the nerve center of the conquest. To the north Beryozovo (1593) and Mangazeya (1600–1601) were built to bring the Nenets under tribute, while to the east Surgut (1594) and Tara (1594) were established to protect Tobolsk and subdue the ruler of the Narym Ostiaks. Of these, Mangazeya was the most prominent, becoming a base for further exploration eastward.

Advancing up the Ob and its tributaries, the ostrogs of Ketsk (1602) and Tomsk (1604) were built. Ketsk sluzhilye liudi ("servicemen") reached the Yenisei in 1605, descending it to the Sym; two years later Mangazeyan promyshlenniks and traders descended the Turukhan to its confluence with the Yenisei, where they established the zimovie Turukhansk. By 1610, men from Turukhansk had reached the mouth of the Yenisei and ascended it as far as the Sym, where they met rival tribute collectors from Ketsk. To ensure subjugation of the natives, the ostrogs of Yeniseysk (1619) and Krasnoyarsk (1628) were established.

Following the khan's death and the dissolution of any organised Siberian resistance, the Russians advanced first towards Lake Baikal and then the Sea of Okhotsk and the Amur River. However, when they first reached the Chinese border they encountered people that were equipped with artillery pieces and here they halted.

The Russians reached the Pacific Ocean in 1639. After the conquest of the Siberian Khanate (1598), the whole of North Asia—an area much larger than the old khanate—became known as Siberia and, by 1640, the eastern borders of Russia had expanded more than several million square kilometres. In a sense, the khanate lived on in the subsidiary title "Tsar of Siberia" which became part of the full imperial style of the Russian autocrats.

In essence, imperial expansion involved traveling further up or down rivers in search of indigenous peoples to add to the lists of tribute (yasak) payers. As this entry and much scholarship show, that process entailed a good deal of violence and coercion, contrary to the "gentle" methods tsarist decrees espoused. In several cases throughout the early modern period, however, a significant gap existed between the rhetorical sovereign claims of the Russian state and its ability to actually control indigenous populations.

While fur procurement played a significant role in Siberian expansion, it was not the sole driver. Russian leaders were also keen to find and establish trade routes to the East. They were similarly motivated to establish trade in Siberia, both to supply the territory with needed goods as well as to benefit from indirect tax revenue on traded goods. Tax revenue was collected through the network of customs posts that the state established throughout Siberia, even recruiting emigre merchants from Central Asia—typically called Bukharans—to assist in customs administration and diplomatic tasks.

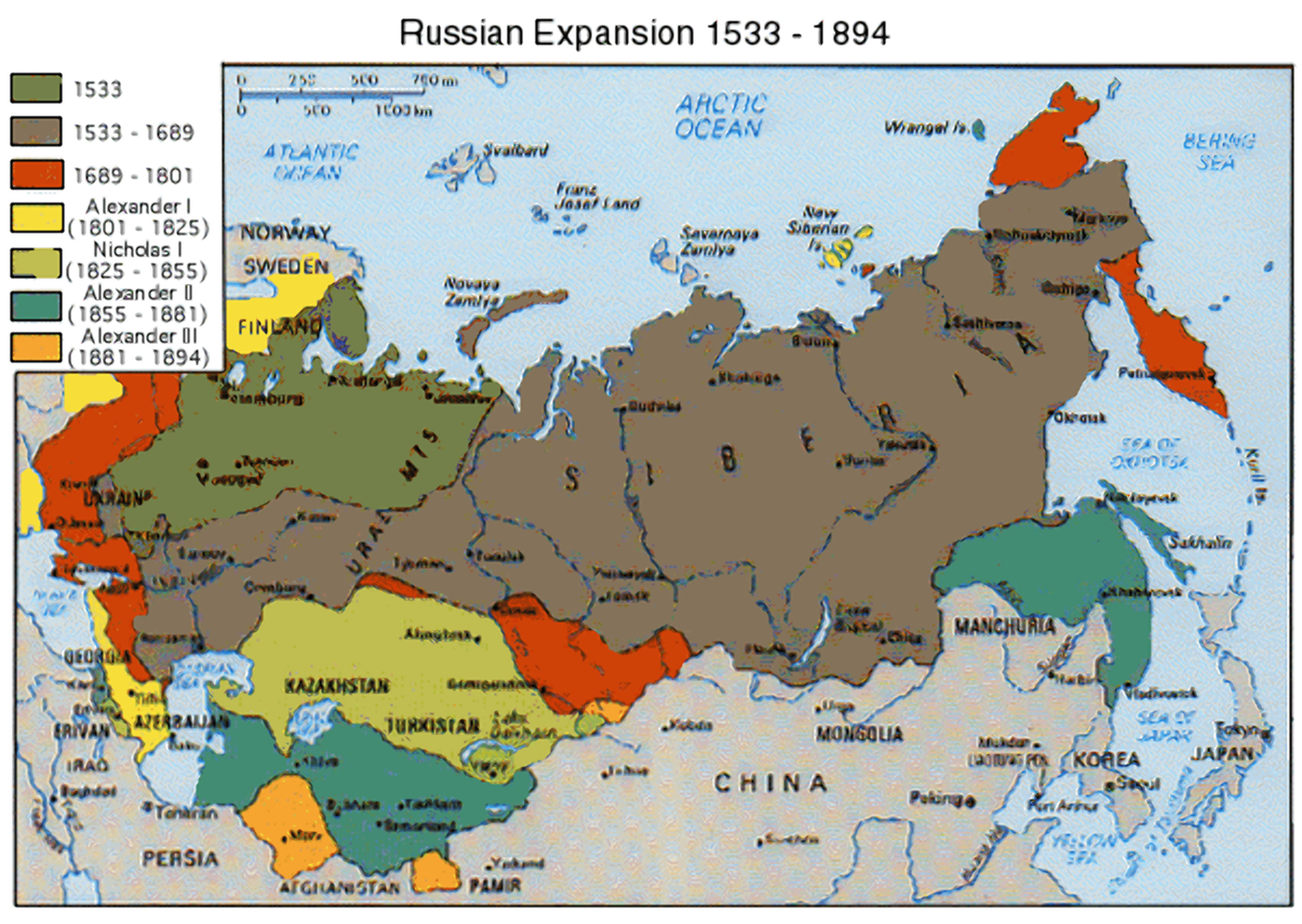
Map of Russia from 1533 to 1896

The conquest of Siberia also resulted in the spread of diseases. Historian John F. Richards wrote: "... it is doubtful that the total early modern Siberian population exceeded 300,000 persons. ... New diseases weakened and demoralized the indigenous peoples of Siberia. The worst of these was smallpox "because of its swift spread, the high death rates, and the permanent disfigurement of survivors." ... In the 1650s, it moved east of the Yenisey, where it carried away up to 80 percent of the Tungus and Yakut populations. In the 1690s, smallpox epidemics reduced Yukagir numbers by an estimated 44 percent. The disease moved rapidly from group to group across Siberia."

=== Effects on the indigenous peoples of Siberia ===
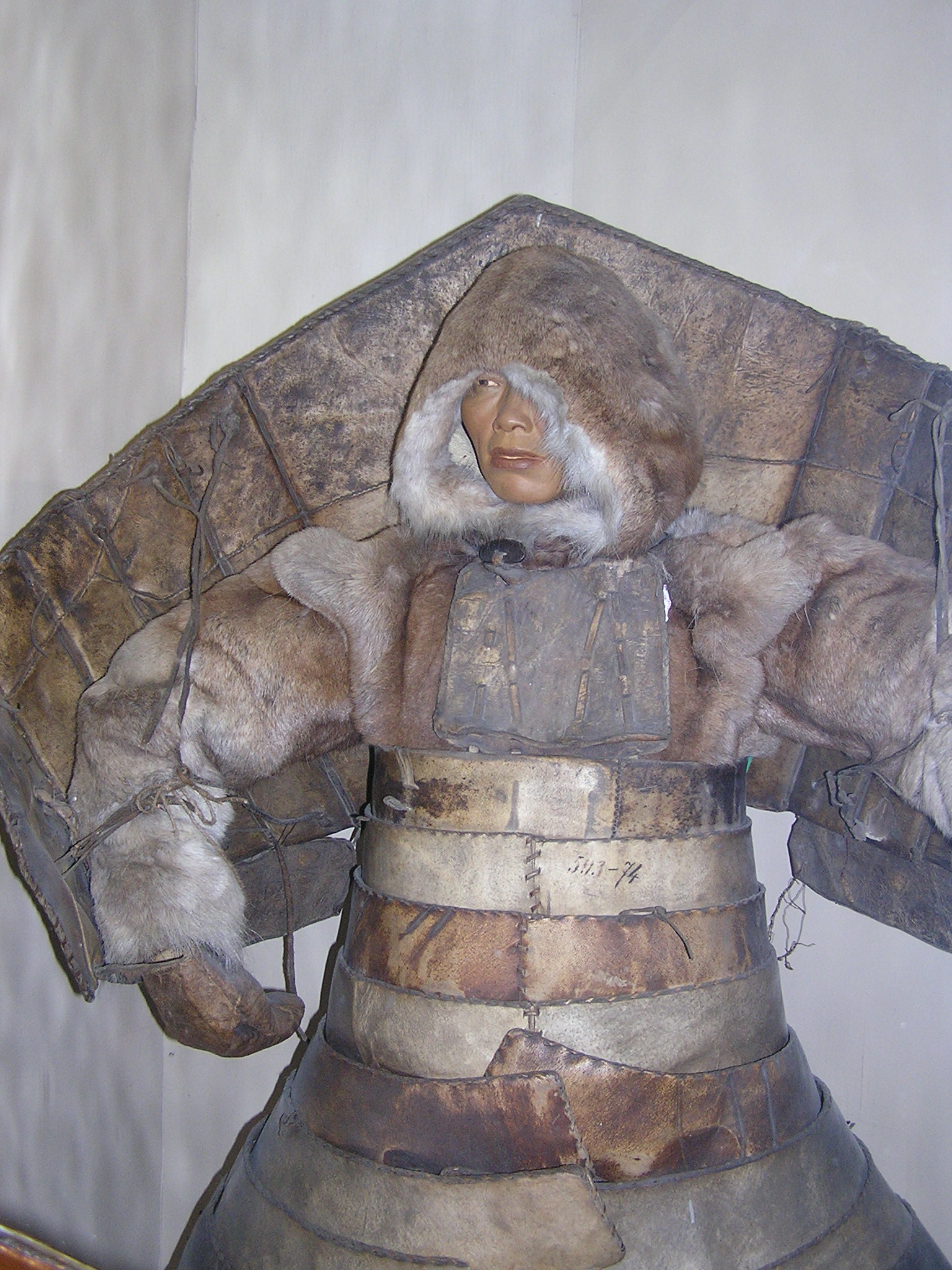
Laminar armour from hardened leather reinforced by wood and bones such as this was worn by native Siberians

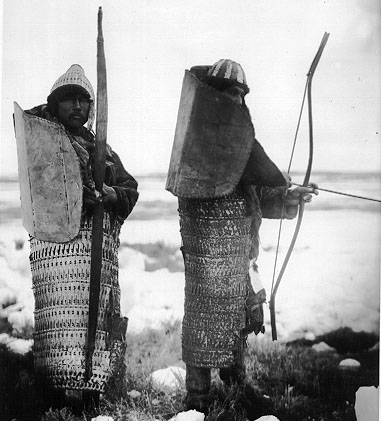
Lamellar armour traditionally worn by the Koryak people (circa 1900)

When the Cossacks' entreaties were rejected, they chose to respond with force. Under the leadership of Vasilii Poyarkov in 1645 and Yerofei Khabarov in 1650 many people, including members of the Daur tribe, were killed by the Cossacks. Out of a previous population of 20,000 in Kamchatka, 8,000 remained after the first half-century of the Russian conquest. The Daurs initially deserted their villages fearing the reported cruelty of the Russians the first time Khabarov came. The second time he came, the Daurs fought back against the Russians, but were slaughtered. In the 17th century, indigenous peoples of the Amur region were attacked by Russians who came to be known as "red-beards".

In the 1640s, the Yakuts were subjected to violent expeditions during the Russian advance into the land near the Lena River, and on Kamchatka in the 1690s the Koryaks, Kamchadals, and Chukchi were also subjected to this by the Russians according to Western historian Stephen Shenfield. When the Russians did not obtain the demanded amount of yasak from the natives, the governor of Yakutsk, Piotr Golovin, who was a Cossack, used meat hooks to hang the native men. In the Lena basin, 70% of the Yakut population declined within 40 years, native women were raped and, along with children, were often enslaved in order to force the natives to pay the yasak.

According to John F. Richards:

Smallpox first reached western Siberia in 1630. In the 1650s, it moved east of the Yenisey, where it carried away up to 80 percent of the Tungus and Yakut populations. In the 1690s, smallpox epidemics reduced Yukagir numbers by an estimated 44 percent. The disease moved rapidly from group to group across Siberia. Death rates in epidemics reached 50 percent of the population. The scourge returned at twenty- to thirty-year intervals, with dreadful results among the young.

In Kamchatka, the Russians crushed the Itelmen uprisings against their rule in 1706, 1731, and 1741. The first time, the Itelmens were armed with stone weapons and were badly unprepared and equipped but they used gunpowder weapons the second time. The Russians faced tougher resistance when from 1745 to 1756 they tried to subjugate the gun and bow equipped Koryaks until their victory. The Russian Cossacks also faced fierce resistance and were forced to give up trying to wipe out the Chukchi in 1729, 1730–1731, and 1744–1747. After the Russian defeat in 1729 at Chukchi hands, the Russian commander Major Pavlutskiy was responsible for the Russian war against the Chukchi and the mass slaughters and enslavement of Chukchi women and children in 1730–1731, but his cruelty only made the Chukchis fight more fiercely. Cleansing of the Chukchis and Koryaks was ordered by Empress Elizabeth in 1742 to totally expel them from their native lands and erase their culture through war. The command was that the natives be "totally extirpated" with Pavlutskiy leading again in this war from 1744 to 1747 in which he led the Cossacks "with the help of Almighty God and to the good fortune of Her Imperial Highness", to slaughter the Chukchi men and enslave their women and children as booty. However the Chukchi ended this campaign and forced them to give up by decapitating and killing Pavlutskiy.

The Russians were also launching wars and slaughters against the Koryaks in 1744 and 1753–1754. After the Russians tried to force the natives to convert to Christianity, the different native peoples like the Koryaks, Chukchis, Itelmens, and Yukaghirs all united to drive the Russians out of their land in the 1740s, culminating in the assault on Nizhnekamchatsk fort in 1746. Kamchatka today is European in demographics and culture with only 5% of it being native, around 10,000 from a previous number of 150,000, due to infectious diseases such as smallpox and mass slaughters by the Cossacks after its annexation in 1697 of the Itelmens and Koryaks throughout the first decades of Russian rule. The killings by the Russian Cossacks devastated the native peoples of Kamchatka. In addition to committing massacres the Cossacks also devastated the wildlife by slaughtering massive numbers of animals for fur. 90% of the Kamchadals and half of the Vogules were killed from the eighteenth to nineteenth centuries and the rapid slaughter of the indigenous population led to entire ethnic groups being entirely wiped out, with around 12 exterminated groups which could be named by Nikolai Yadrintsev as of 1882. Much of the slaughter was brought on by the Siberian fur trade.

The oblastniki in the 19th century among the Russians in Siberia acknowledged that the natives were subjected to immense violent exploitation, and claimed that they would rectify the situation with their proposed regionalist policies.

The Aleuts in the Aleutians were subjected to genocide and slavery by the Russian fur traders for the first 20 years of Russian rule, with the Aleut women and children captured by the Russians and Aleut men slaughtered.

The Slavic Russians outnumber all of the native peoples in Siberia and its cities except in the Republics of Tuva and Sakha, with the Slavic Russians making up the majority in the Buryat and Altai Republics, outnumbering the Buriat, and Altai natives. The Buryats make up only 33.5% of their own Republic, the Altai 37% and the Chukchi only 28%; the Evenk, Khanty, Mansi, and Nenets are outnumbered by non-natives by 90% of the population. The natives were targeted by the tsars and Soviet policies to change their way of life, and ethnic Russians were given the natives' reindeer herds and wild game which were confiscated by the tsars and Soviets. The reindeer herds have been mismanaged to the point of extinction.

The Ainu have emphasized that they were the natives of the Kuril Islands and that the Japanese and Russians were both invaders.

== Timeline of conquest ==
=== 16th century: Conquest of Western Siberia ===
- 1581–1585 – Siberian campaign of Ermak Timofeevich
- 1586 – Vasily Sukin founded Tyumen (the first Russian city in Siberia), on the site on the former capital of the Siberian Khanate
- 1587 – Tobolsk was founded on the Irtysh, which later became the "Capital of Siberia"
- 1590 – The first decree on the resettlement of the Russian population in Siberia (35 "arable people" from Solvychegodsk district "with their wives and children and with all the estate" were sent to settle in Siberia)
- 1593 – Berezov founded
- 1594 – Surgut and Tara founded
- 1595 – Obdorsk founded
- 1598 – Conquest of the Piebald Horde, Narym founded
- 1598 – Battle of Irmen, the final conquest of the Siberian Khanate.

=== 17th century: From the Yenisei to the Pacific Ocean, conflicts with China and Dzungar Khanate ===
Political map of Asia in 1636.

- 1601 – Mangazeya was founded (to control the West Siberian Samoyeds)
- 1604 – Tomsk was founded as a fortress against the Dzungars and the Yenisei Kirghiz
- 1607 – Turukhansk was founded (the first city on the Yenisei), the conquest of the Enets
- 1618 – Kuznetsk founded
- 1619 – Yeniseisk founded
- after 1620 – An unknown unsuccessful expedition to Taimyr (finds in Simsa Bay and the Thaddeus Islands)
- 1623 – Pyanda first reached the Lena River in the Kirensk region
- 1628 – Voivode Andrey Dubensky founded Krasnoyarsk on the Yenisei, Kansky Ostrozhek was founded
- 1630 – Vasily Bugor founded Kirensk on the Lena, Ivan Galkin founded the llim winter hut
- 1631 – Ataman Maxim Perfilyev founded the Bratsk prison on the Angara, the Ust-Kutsk prison was founded
- 1632 – Pyotr Beketov founded Yakutsk and Zhigansk. Two years later, the Yakuts defeated the Cossack detachment of Ivan Galkin on the Lena and laid siege to Yakutsk. Such a counterattack by the local population was largely due to the strife between the Cossack detachments (Mangazeya and Yenisei), who were in conflict over the collection of yasak
- 1633 – Ivan Rebrov discovered the mouth of the Lena and the Yana River
- 1638 – Yakut Voivodeship was established, the horse campaign of the centurion Ivanov to Indigirka against the Yukaghirs
- 1638 – Expedition of the stolnik Peter Golovin and clerk Efim Filatov to the Lena River to build a prison
- 1639 – Kopylov sent a detachment under the command of Ivan Moskvitin to the Sea of Lamsky
- 1643 – Ataman Vasily Kolesnikov reaches Lake Baikal while Mikhail Stadukhin reaches Kolyma
- 1643 – Vasily Poyarkov's expedition to the Amur region (Dauria), rafting down the Amur to the Sea of Okhotsk
- 1644–1645 – Campaign of the Cossacks against the Buryats in the Angarsk Steppe
- 1646 – Expedition of Vasily Poyarkov: a campaign from Yakutsk to the Sea of Okhotsk
- 1647 – Ivan Moskvitin founded Okhotsk
- 1648 – Semyon Dezhnev passes the Bering Strait, the first European to do so, 80 years before Vitus Bering.
- 1648–1653 – Yerofey Khabarov's campaigns in Dauria
- 1649–1689 – Russian-Qing border conflict
- 1652 – Battle of Achan prison
- 1653 – Chita and Nerchinsk were founded in Transbaikalia
- 1655 – Siege of Kumar prison
- 1661 – Irkutsk was founded on the Angara by Yakov Pokhabov
- 1665 – Selenginsky prison was founded by Gavrila Lovtsov on the Selenga
- 1665–1667 – Start of Dzungar–Russian conflicts
- 1665–1667 – Dzungar conquest of Yenisei, Russia looses significant parts of Siberia
- 1666 – On the Uda, at its confluence with the Selenga, the Uda winter hut was founded, later to be known as the Uda jail
- 1685–1686 – Siege of Albazin
- 1686 – An unsuccessful attempt to penetrate Taimyr (Ivan Tolstoukhov): the expedition went missing
- 1689 – China and Russia sign the Treaty of Nerchinsk
- 1692 – An expedition of Russian service people against the Yenisei Kirghiz, the defeat of the Tubinsky ulus. Up to 700 Kirghiz were killed in the battle.
- 1697–1698 – The annexation of Kamchatka by the expedition of Vladimir Atlasov
- 1699 – When returning to the Anadyr prison, the Seryukov detachment was destroyed

=== 18th century: Conquest of Chukotka and Kamchatka ===
- 1703–1715 – An uprising in Kamchatka against the Russians, during which the Bolsheretsky and Aklansky prisons were burned and about 200 Cossacks were killed; in 1705, the Koryaks destroyed a Cossack detachment led by Protopopov. In 1715, the Russians took the largest Koryak settlement, Bolshoy Posad.
- 1709 – Bikatun prison was set up in the foothills of Altai
- 1709–1710 – Dzungars invade Southern Siberia
- 1711 – Danila Antsiferov discovers the Kuril Islands
- 1712 – Revolt and murder of their chiefs (Atlasov, Chirikov, and Mironov) by the Cossacks in Kamchatka
- 1712 – Mercury Vagin discovers the New Siberian Islands
- 1716 – Omsk is founded
- 1716 – Siege of Yamyshev
- 1720 – Battle of Zaysan (1720)
- 1730s–1740s – Trips to Chukotka. Military expeditions of Russian detachments under the command of Pavlutsky.
- 1733–1743 – The Great Northern Expedition to explore the Siberian coast of the Arctic Ocean (Khariton Laptev, Semyon Cheyuskin): the deserted Taimyr was explored, the mountains of Byrranga and Cape Chelyuskin (The Northern tip of Siberia) were discovered
- 1740 – Petropavlovsk-Kamchatsky was founded
- 1747 – The Chukchi destroyed the detachment of the Anadyr commandant
- 1748–1755 – Seven military campaigns against the Chukchi
- 1752 – The Gizhiginskaya fortress was founded
- 1753 – Siege by the Koryaks of the Gizhiginskaya fortress
- 1778 – The final annexation of Chukotka

== Ideology ==
The core ideological justification for Russian expansion into Siberia stemmed from the interpretation that the legal incorporation of the Khanate of Sibir into the Russian realm gave Russia legal sovereignty over the entirety of the territory stretching from the Ural Mountains to the Pacific Ocean to the east. The actual boundaries of Siberia thus became very vaguely defined and open to interpretation; effectively, Russian dominion over the land ended only whenever Russia's claims to land conflicted with those of centralised states capable of opposing Russian expansion and consistently asserting their own sovereignty over a given territory, such as China and Mongolia. A second ideological pillar justifying Russian colonialism was the spread of Eastern Orthodox Christianity, although this pretext originated largely from explorers and settlers themselves as an ad hoc justification rather than being put forward by the Russian Orthodox Church itself.

== See also ==
- List of Russian explorers
- Russian irredentism
- Sino-Russian border conflicts
- Siberian regionalism
