= Andrey Voyeykov =

- Андрей Матвеевич Воейков
- Died: 1654
- Military career
- Allegiance: Russian
- Rank: Voyevoda
- Conflicts: Russo–Polish War (1654–1667); Russian conquest of Siberia: Battle of Irmen

Andrey Matveyevich Voyeykov (Russian: Андрей Матвеевич Воейков) (? – after 1654) was a Russian voyevoda. It is known that he was employed by tsar Feodor I of Russia and sent to Siberia as a military commander of Tara. He became famous for defeating the last Siberian khan Kuchum in the Barabinsk Steppe in 1598, whose entire family would be taken prisoner and sent to Moscow. After this event, there is no information on Andrey Voyevkov. His name is last mentioned in 1654, when he, already an old man, captured the city of Mogilev together with a voyevoda named Poklonsky during the Russo–Polish War (1654–67).
