= Battle of Irtysh River (1585) =

Decisive 16th century battle in Siberia

Battle of the Irtysh
- Part of the Russian conquest of Siberia
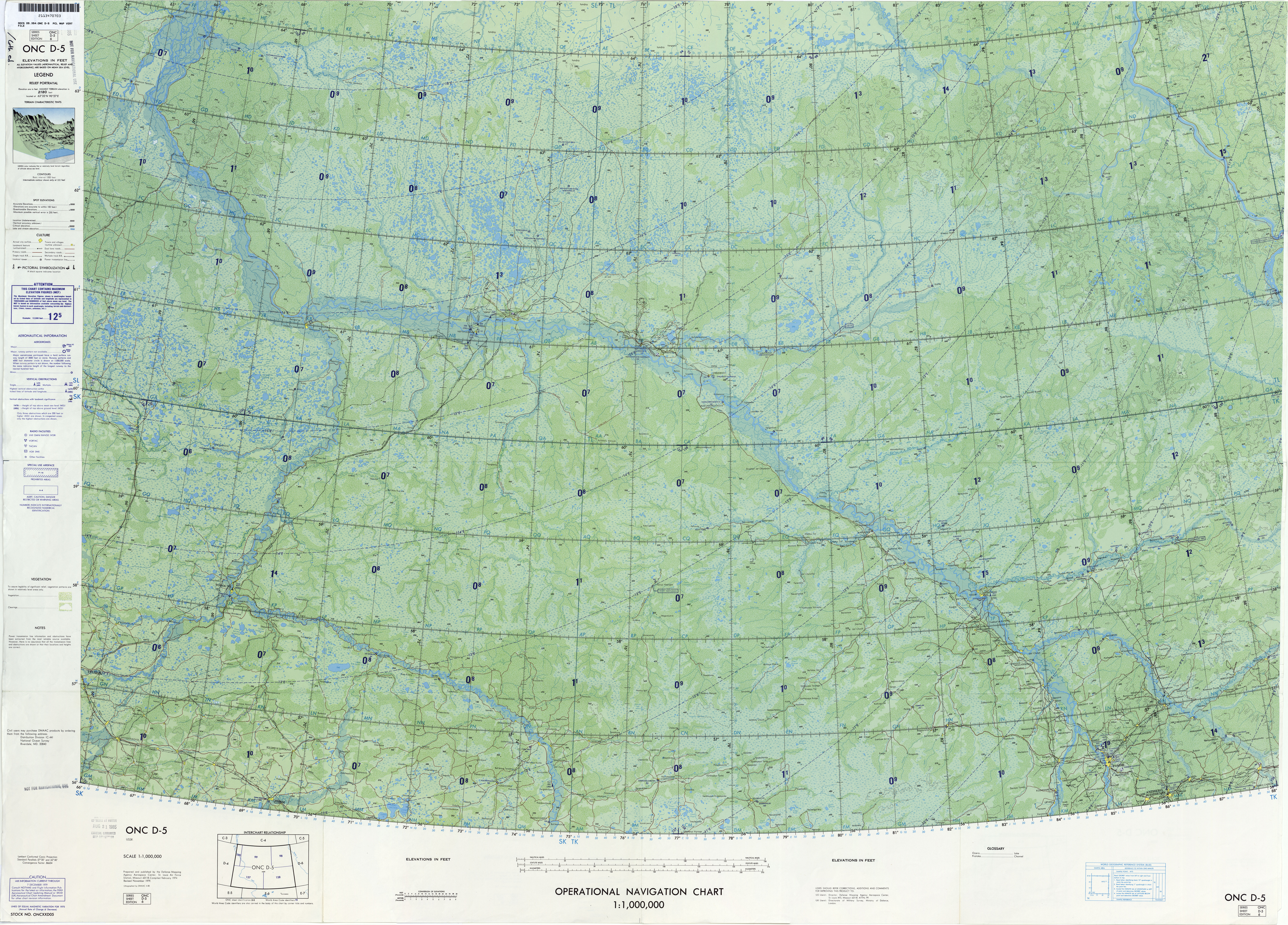
- Operational Navigation Chart of the Irtysh River
Date	August 6, 1585
Location	Bank of the Irytysh river (Modern-day Omsk) 54°59′N 73°22′E
Result	Decisive Sibir victory
Territorial changes	Reconquest of parts of Sibir by Kuchum Khan

Belligerents
Khanate of Sibir	Tsardom of Russia

Commanders and leaders
(Khanate of Sibir) Kuchum Khan	(Tsardom of Russia) Yermak Timofeyevich †

Strength
Unknown, more	633 men

Casualties and losses
Unknown, less	630 killed

The Battle of the Irtysh, also called the Battle of Omsk, was a decisive military engagement fought between the Khanate of Sibir and the Tsardom of Russia, and saw the death of Russian General Yermak Timofeyevich and the reconquest of Sibir by Kuchum Khan.

== Prelude ==
With the onset and worsening of the food shortage, Yermak's people had now entered a time of famine. Kuchum, knowing this, set a trap. The most common account is that Kuchum purposely leaked information to Yermak, in which it was claimed that Bukharan merchants from Central Asia, traveling with large amounts of food, were being prevented from moving by Kuchum's men. In August 1584, Yermak set out with a band of men to free the traders. Finding the reports to be false, Yermak ordered a return to Qashliq. Whether because of an ongoing storm or because the men were tired from rowing upstream, Yermak's force stopped on a small island formed by two branches of the Irtysh and set up camp on the night of August 4–5, 1584. Convinced that the river offered protection, Yermak's men fell asleep with no guard.

== Battle ==
Kuchum, however, had been following Yermak's party and was lying in wait. Kuchum's forces forded the river around midnight; their approach was hidden by the loudness of the storm and the dark of night. Kuchum's Tatars were upon Yermak's men so quickly that they could not use either their guns or weapons, and a slaughter ensued. In the ensuing chaos, it is reported that all but three men on the Russian side were killed, including Yermak. Legend has it that after fighting through the invaders and being wounded in the arm by a knife, Yermak, finding that their boats had been washed away in the storm, attempted to cross the river. Due to the weight of the armor gifted to him by the Tsar, Yermak sank to the bottom and drowned. At least one survivor, unburdened by such heavy armor, was able to flee across the river and return to Qashliq with news of Yermak's death.
