= Ubashi =

Ubashi (Mongolian: ᠤᠪᠠᠰᠢ), also spelled Ubasi, is a Mongolian given name, derived from Sanskrit upāsaka.

People with the given name include:

- Ubasi Khong Tayiji (died 1623), Altan Khan of the Khalkha
- Ubashi Khan (1744–1774), Khan of the Kalmyk Khanate
