= Khotogoid =

Mongol subgroup in northwestern Mongolia

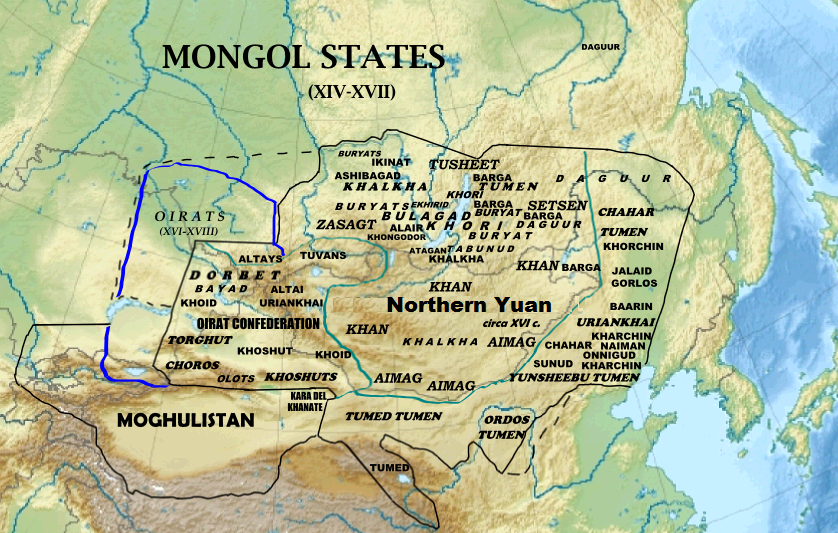
- Location of the Khotogoid

Regions with significant populations
- Mongolia: 15,460

Languages
- Khotogoid dialect of Mongolian

Religion
- Tibetan Buddhism, Mongolian shamanism

Related ethnic groups
- Mongols

Khotogoid or Khotgoid (Хотгойд [χɞtʰɢ̥ɞ́͜ɛt]) is a subgroup of the Mongols living in northwestern Mongolia. The Khotogoid people live roughly between Uvs Lake to the west and the Delgermörön river to the east. The Khotogoids belong to northwestern Khalkha and were one of the major groups that make up Khalkha.

The best-known ruler of Khotogoids probably was Ubasi Khong Tayiji, also known as Altan Khan of the Khotogoid (not to be confused with Altan Khan of Tumed) who was successful in subjecting Yenisei Kirghiz and pushing Oirats out of their domains in western Mongolia. The northern border of the Khotgoid Khanate reached modern Russian Krasnoyarsk city and the southern border reached the eastern Altay Mountains of Mongolia in the 17th century. The Khotogoid Khanate was not an independent state and its ruler was subject to Zasagtu khan aimag of Khalkha.

In mid 17th century, because of the conflicts with neighboring Zasagtu Khan, the Khotogoids disintegrated and ceased to exist as a separate political unit. As a result, Khotogoids were frequently invaded by both other Khalkhas and Oirats.

The Khotogoids moved into the area in the 16th century. In 1694, they were organized into the Zasaghtu Khan aimag's Erdeni Degüregchi Wang khoshuu. After Chingünjav's rebellion in 1756-57, this khoshuu was split up into five smaller entities: Erdeni Degüregchi Wang khoshuu, Akhai Beise khoshuu, Mergen Gong khoshuu, Dalai Gong khoshuu, and Tsogtoo Wang khoshuu.

Chingünjav (mentioned above) is probably another well-known Khotogoid besides Ubasji Huang Taizi.
