= Bumburjan =

Bumburjan (also Bumburjei) is a Mongol folk song well known among Kalmyks, Oirats and Khalkhas. The song was featured in the 1942 movie "Sukhbaatar". It is a humorous song about a certain boisterous and smart person called Bumburjei who runs into the ger of the singer after having thrown a bone to the dangerous guard dog in order to distract it. The song is known over a large area, ranging from eastern Europe (Kalmykia) to Mongolia. It is also sung by the Oirats in Xinjiang, China. Given its popularity among the Kalmyks in Europe, the song might date to at least the early 17th century, when the Kalmyks had not yet migrated to Europe.
