= Dmitry Pavlutsky =

Russian polar explorer, military commander

Dmitry Ivanovich Pavlutsky (Russian: Дмитрий Иванович Павлуцкий; died 21 March 1747) was a Russian polar explorer and leader of military expeditions in Chukotka, best known for his campaigns against the indigenous Chukchi people.

As early as 1641, Russian explorers came into contact with the Chukchi. The Russians showed little interest in the region until the late 17th century, when the potential wealth gained from reaching North America became known. However, expeditions to the Bering Strait were often attacked by the indigenous peoples inhabiting the region.

In 1725, Tsar Peter the Great ordered a Russian military expedition to conquer the Chukchi, but the expedition failed and its commander, Major Afanasy Shestakov (Афанасий Шестаков), was killed in March 1730 near the Paren River. Another expedition was ordered in 1731, this time led by Major Pavlutsky, who became feared by the Chukchi for his brutal punitive expeditions, using destructive tactics such wholesale slaughter, the burning of villages, driving off reindeer, and capturing women and children. The Chuvans, Koryaks, and Yukagirs eventually pledged loyalty to the Russian Empire and asked for protection against the Chukchi.

On 12 March 1747, a party of 500 Chukchi warriors raided the Russian stockade of Anadyrsk. Pavlutsky's regiment of 131 men, consisting of 96 Cossacks and 35 Koryak allies, set off in pursuit, catching up with the Chuchki near the settlement of Markovo. Pavlutsky ordered an attack despite lacking reinforcements, and his outnumbered regiment was defeated in a battle reminiscent of the Battle of the Little Bighorn. Pavlutsky, wearing iron chain mail armor, was able to escape the field unhurt but was surrounded on a small nearby hill (now called Major's Hill) and killed. His head was reportedly cut off and kept by the Chukchi for years afterward. Pavlutsky's body is buried in Yakutsk.

By 1750 it had become clear the Chukchi would be difficult to conquer. Saint Petersburg changed tactics, making formal peace with them in 1778. The Chukchi entered into peaceful trade with the Russians, and from 1788 onward there was an annual trade fair on the lower Kolyma. Although the Russian Empire declared the whole of Siberia subdued by the late 18th century, the Chukchi refused to accept Russian overlordship until after the Russian Revolution in 1917.

== See also ==
- Russian conquest of Siberia
