= Kuchum Khan =

Khan of Sibir from 1563 to 1598

- Khan
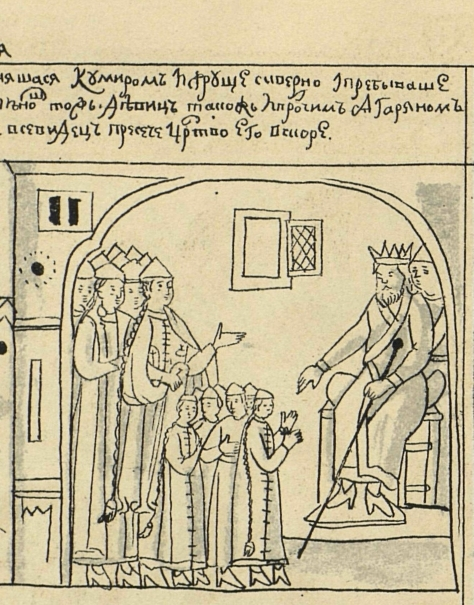
- Kuchum Khan in Qashliq

Khan of the Sibir Khanate
- Reign: 1563–1598
- Predecessor: Yadigar bin Qasim
- Successor: Monarchy abolished
- Born: 1527; Nogai Horde or Khanate of Sibir
- Died: c. 1605 (aged 78); Bukhara?
- Spouse: Suzge Khanum; Saltanym; Jandawlat; Syudejan; Aktulum; Ak-Syuiryun; Shevlel; Qubul; Chepshan
- Issue: Ali; Qanai; Azim; Ishim; Abdul-Khair; Asmanaq; Others
- Father: Murtaza ibn Ibak Khan
- Religion: Islam

Kuchum Khan (Turki and Persian: کوچم خان, Siberian Tatar: Kütsem; Күцем, Russian: Кучум; 1527-c. 1605) was the last khan of Siberia, reigning from 1563 to 1598.

Kuchum Khan's attempt to spread Islam and his cross-border raids met with vigorous opposition from Russian tsar Ivan the Terrible (r. 1547–1584).

== Background ==
Kuchum was the son of prince Murtaza from the Shayban dynasty (Şäyban) and a descendant of Hadji Muhammad. In 1554, he contested the throne of the Siberian Khanate against the incumbent brothers Yadegar (Yädegär) and Bekbulat, who were both Russian vassals.

In 1563, Yadegar was defeated and Kuchum assumed the throne. Kuchum adopted an anti-Russian stance on the basis of religion. Kuchum aimed to secure a military assistance from the Crimean Khanate and the Ottoman Empire. However, Kuchum's attempts at forcibly converting his non-Turkic subjects, including the Mansi, Khanty and Selkup, may have alienated them instead.

== War with Russia ==
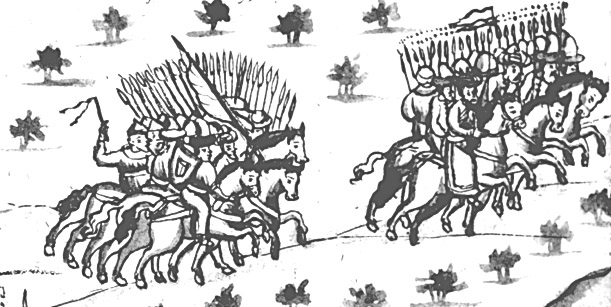
The fall of Qashliq to Yermak, and the flight of Kuchum. A miniature from the Kungur Chronicle

In 1572, Russian tsar Ivan the Terrible ordered the Stroganovs to have a Cossack ataman lead an expedition to force the natives into submission. The Stroganovs proposed an invasion of the Siberian Khanate, which Ivan agreed to and authorized the use of guns for the operation.

In 1582, the Siberian Khanate was attacked by the Cossack ataman Yermak, who defeated Kuchum's forces and captured the capital Qashliq. Kuchum retreated into the steppes, and over the next few years regrouped his forces. He suddenly attacked Yermak on August 6, 1584, in the dead of night, and killed Yermak and most of his army; regaining control of the now-ruined Qashliq. Kuchum attempted to unite the rival factions within the khanate's nobility but met resistance. After an unsuccessful attempt on his life by Qarachi Sayet Khan (Säyet), Kuchum was forced to move his horde to the steppe south of the Irtysh river. There he attempted to establish a new khanate, engaging in a war against the Russian governors.

In 1590, Kuchum raided the Tatars around Tobolsk who were paying yasak (tribute) to the Russians. In 1591, Koltsov caught Kuchum on the Ishym River and captured two of his wives and his son Abdul-Khair who was later given estates in Russia. In 1594, the fort at Tara was built in part to control Kuchum who was in the area. In 1595, Kuchum's followers were raided on the upper Irtysh. In 1597, Kuchum asked for negotiations and the Tsar and Abdul-Khair wrote from Russia offering estates in Russia in return for surrender. Before September 1598, Andrey Voyeykov caught a large group of his followers at a place called Ub Lake and later caught Kuchum on the Ob River. Kuchum fled, but the Russians killed two of his sons and captured five other sons, eight wives and eight daughters. A Muslim cleric was sent to negotiate. Kuchum replied, describing himself as deaf and blind and without subsistence and said that he had not submitted before and would not submit now. This was his last contact with the Russians. He is believed to have died c. 1605 in Bukhara. In 1620, his son Ishim-khan married a daughter of Kho Orluk who was then leading his people from Dzugharia to the Volga.

== Legacy ==
In 1591, Kuchum's son, Abul Khayir was the first of his dynasty to convert to Christianity. His conversion was followed by the conversion of his entire family who eventually assimilated into the Russian nobility. For instance, although Abul Khayir's son was known as Vasily Abulgairovich, his grandson's name, Roman Vasilyevich, could no longer be distinguished from a native Russian name.

In 1686, the tsar decreed that the dynasties of the ruler of Imeretia in the Caucasus along with the Tatar princes of Siberia and Kasimov were to be added into the Genealogical Book of the Russian nobility.

Around 1620, one of his sons named Ishim-khan, was married to a daughter of the Torghut prince Kho Orluk who moved from western Mongolia to establish the Kalmyk Khanate in the Volga region of European Russia. With the support received from the Oirats, Ishim's descendants from the Torghut princess continued his ressistance against the Russians. In 1661, Ishim's sons fought the Russians in Bashkiria. In 1739, during the Bashkir War, some said Karasakal to be a Kuchumid.

In 2025, a monument depicting his wife Suzge Khanum was installed in Tobolsk, then subsequently removed by authorities, who said that the installation was not approved.

== Sources ==
- Forsyth, James (1994). A History of the Peoples of Siberia Russia's North Asian Colony 1581-1990. Cambridge University Press. ISBN 9780521477710.

Kuchum Khan Shaybanid
Preceded by Yadegar	Khan of Sibir; 1563-1598	Succeeded by None
