= List of wars involving Mongolia =

The country of Mongolia has fought many wars from its first independence after the Mongolian Revolution of 1911 until the present day. The list gives the name, the date, combatants, and the result of these conflicts following this legend:

Mongolian victory
Mongolian defeat
Another result
(e.g. a treaty or peace without a clear result, result unknown or indecisive etc.)
Ongoing conflict

== Pre 1911 ==
See List of wars involving Mongolia (pre 1911)

== Beginning of the 20th century ==
This section contains list of wars and major battles involving different Mongolian states that existed in the first four decades of the 20th century (Mongolia (1911–1924), Buryat-Mongolia, Uryankhay Republic).

Date	Conflict	Combatant 1	Combatant 2	Result
1911–1912	Mongolian Revolution of 1911	Bogd Khanate of Mongolia	Qing dynasty Manchu	Victory: Establishment of an independent Mongolia
1917–1923	Russian Civil War — Eastern Front of the Russian Civil War	Buryat-Mongolia; Green Ukraine	White Movement Red Army	Defeat
1919–1921	Occupation of Mongolia	Bogd Khanate of Mongolia; Buryat-Mongolia; White Movement	Republic of China	Initial defeat, Later victory: Mongolian military defeat; Liberation of Mongolia by the White Army's Asiatic Cavalry Division
1921	Liberation of Urga	Bogd Khanate of Mongolia: Baron Ungern	Republic of China	Victory
1921	Mongolian Revolution of 1921	Bogd Khanate of Mongolia; White Movement	RPGOM; Red Army	Defeat of the Bogd Khaanate: Creation of the Mongolian People's Republic; Liberation of Mongolia from Goomindan; Independence of Mongolia secured

== Mongol United Autonomous Government and the Mengjiang ==
This section contains list of wars involving Mongol United Autonomous Government and the Mengjiang state.

Date	Conflict	Combatant 1	Combatant 2	Result
1935–1937	Suiyuan Campaign	Mongol Military Government; Japan	China	Defeat
August-October 1937	Operation Chahar	Mongol Military Government; Japan; Manchukuo	China	Victory
September 1 – November 9 1937	Battle of Taiyuan	Mongol Military Government; Japan	China	Victory
November 1939 – April 1940	1939–1940 Winter Offensive	Mengjiang; Japan	China	Victory
December 1939	Battle of Baotou	Mengjiang; Japan	China	Victory: The Chinese army was unsuccessful in capturing the city of Baotou and eventually retreated voluntarily
January 1940 – February 1940	Battle of West Suiyuan	Mengjiang; Japan	China	Defeat
9 August–2 September 1945	Soviet invasion of Manchuria	Mengjiang; Japan	Soviet Union; Mongolia	Defeat: Collapse of Mengjiang or Menggukuo capitulated

== Mongolian People's Republic ==
This section contains list of wars involving Mongolian People's Republic.

Date	Conflict	Combatant 1	Combatant 2	Result
1932	Khuvsgul Uprising	Mongolian People's Republic	Buddhist lamas Tibet (alleged); Empire of Japan (alleged)	Victory
1935	Battle of Khalkhyn Temple	Mongolian People's Republic	Empire of Japan	Victory
1939	Battles of Khalkhin Gol	Union: Mongolian People's Republic	Empire of Japan / Manchukuo	Victory
1945	Soviet–Japanese War	Union: Soviet Union / Mongolian People's Republic	Empire of Japan / Mengjiang	Victory
Aug 1945 - September 1945	Soviet invasion of Manchuria	Union: Soviet Union / Mongolian People's Republic	Empire of Japan / Mengjiang; Manchukuo	Victory
Aug 1945 -Sep 1945	Khingan–Mukden Operation	Union: Soviet Union / Mongolian People's Republic	Empire of Japan; Manchukuo	Victory
1946–1948	Battle of Baitag Bogd	Mongolian People's Republic	China	Inconclusive

== Sources ==
- Halperin, Charles J. (1987). Russia and the Golden Horde: The Mongol Impact on Medieval Russian History. Indiana University. p. 222. ISBN 9781850430575. (e-book).
- Martin, Janet (2007). Medieval Russia: 980–1584. Second Edition. E-book. Cambridge: Cambridge University Press. ISBN 978-0-511-36800-4.
- Ostrowski, Donald (1993). Why did the Metropolitan Move from Kiev to Vladimir in the Thirteenth Century. Christianity and the Eastern Slavs. Vol. I: Slavic Cultures in the Middle Ages. Berkeley: University of California Press. pp. 83–101. ISBN 9780520360198.
- Vásáry, István (2012). "The Crimean Khanate and the Great Horde (1440s–1500s): A Fight for Primacy" (PDF). In Meinolf Arens; Denise Klein (eds.). Das frühneuzeitliche Krimkhanat (16.-18. Jahrhundert) zwischen Orient und Okzident. Harrassowitz: Wiesbaden. pp. 13–26.
- http://gumilevica.kulichki.net/HPH/index.html
