= Badma Erdeni Khong Tayiji =

Badma Erdeni Khong Tayiji (Mongolian: Бадма Эрдэнэ Хунтайж) was a 17th century Mongol prince of the Altan Khan dynasty. Son of Ubashi Khong Tayiji, the first Altan Khan of Khalkha. In 1652, he abdicated the throne and his son Erinchin Lobsang Tayiji succeeded.

Preceded by Ubasi Khong Tayiji	Altan Khan of Khalkha; 1623-1652	Succeeded by Erinchin Lobsang Tayiji
