= Ubasi Khong Tayiji =

17th-century Mongol prince of Khotogoid Altan Khanate of the Khalkha Mongols

Ubashi Khong Tayiji
- Altan Khan of the Khalkha

Altan Khan of the Khotogoid Altan Khanate
- Reign: ?–1623
- Predecessor: Title established
- Successor: Badma Erdeni Khong Tayiji
- Died: 1623
- Issue: Badma Erdeni Khong Tayiji
Names
- Sholoi Ubashi Altan Khan (ᠱᠣᠯᠥᠢ ᠣᠪᠠᠰᠢᠠᠯᠲᠠᠨ ᠬᠠᠭᠠᠨ; Шолой Убаши алтан хаан)
- House: Borjigin
- Dynasty: Khotogoid branch of the Khalkha
- Father: Tümendara Dayiching

Ubashi Khong Tayiji (Mongolian: Убаши хунтайж), more fully Sholoi Ubashi Khong Tayiji (Mongolian: Шолой Убаши хунтайж; died 1623), was a 17th-century Mongol prince of the Khotogoid branch of the Khalkha Mongols. He was the first Altan Khan of the Khalkha, ruling in northwestern Mongolia around the Uvs Nuur Basin, and was known in Russian sources as the Altyn Tsar.

Ubashi belonged to the Right Wing of the Khalkha Mongols and was related to the line of the Zasagt Khans, but his own Khotogoid branch developed a strong autonomous power in the northwestern Khalkha region. His authority extended toward the western Mongolian and southern Siberian frontier, where the interests of the Khalkha, the Oirat Mongols, the Yenisei Kyrgyz, Tuvans, Telengits, Kazakhs, and Russian Siberian officials overlapped.

His reign was dominated by war with the Four Oirat Confederation. Ubashi sought to expand Khotogoid influence over Oirat pasturelands and the Siberian tribute routes, while the Oirat princes fought to preserve their own influence in the Irtysh, Yamysh, Ala-Köl, and southern Siberian regions. After several campaigns between 1608 and 1623, the united Oirat Mongol forces defeated and killed him in 1623.

== Names and titles ==
The ruler is known by several forms of his name, including Ubashi Khong Tayiji, Ubasi Qong Tayiji, Sholoi Ubashi Khong Tayiji, and Sholoi-Ubashi Khungtaiji. The title Khong Tayiji derives from Chinese huang taizi, meaning "imperial heir-apparent", but among the Mongols it was used as a high aristocratic title for only Chinggisid princes.

Russian sources called him and his successors Altyn Tsar, corresponding to Altan Khan, or "Golden Khan". This title should not be confused with Altan Khan, the sixteenth-century ruler of the Tümed. In the Khalkha context, the title refers to the Khotogoid rulers of northwestern Mongolia, beginning with Ubashi Khong Tayiji.

== Lineage and political position ==
Ubashi Khong Tayiji was a descendant of Dayan Khan through Dayan Khan's youngest son Geresenje, the ancestor of the Khalkha princely houses. Geresenje's sons divided the Khalkha into hereditary appanages. According to Miyawaki's reconstruction, the descendants of Asiqai, Noyantai, Deldeng, and Samu belonged to the Right Wing, while the descendants of Noyonuqu and Amin belonged to the Left Wing.

Ubashi descended from Asiqai, the eldest son of Geresenje. His lineage was:

- Dayan Khan
  - Geresenje
    - Asiqai
      - Tümendara Dayiching
        - Ubashi Khong Tayiji

The leading khan of the Right Wing was Laiqur Khan, a grandson of Asiqai and founder of the Jasagtu Khan line. Ubashi was a kinsman of Laiqur. Although the Khotogoid Altan Khans were formally connected to the Right Wing and to the Jasagtu Khans, they built a powerful base in northwestern Khalkha and obeyed the Jasagtu Khans only nominally.

== Rule in northwestern Khalkha ==
Ubashi ruled the Khotogoid, a Khalkha group based in northwestern Mongolia. His main territory lay around Uvs Lake and the surrounding steppe and mountain zones. This area was strategically important because it connected the Khalkha lands to the east, the Oirat lands to the west, the Altai and Irtysh regions to the southwest, and the Russian Siberian frontier to the north.

At the beginning of the seventeenth century, Ubashi extended his influence over neighboring peoples. Mongolian and Russian materials describe him as collecting tribute from some groups of the Yenisei Kyrgyz, the Telengits, and Tuvans of the Tagna Mountains. These peoples were also claimed by Oirat rulers and, increasingly, by Russian Siberian officials.

Control over this frontier was central to Ubashi's power. His authority depended not only on the Khotogoid core around Uvs Lake, but also on pasturelands, tribute routes, salt lakes, and access to trade with Siberian towns.

== Relations with Russia ==
The expansion of Russia into western and southwestern Siberia created a new political situation for both the Khotogoid and the Oirats. Russian forts and towns such as Tobolsk, Tara, Tomsk, Kuznetsk, and Krasnoyarsk became centers of diplomacy, trade, tribute collection, and military competition.

Ubashi sought relations with Russia partly because he wanted access to trade and diplomacy without Oirat interference. Russian sources record that he considered the Oirats, especially Khara Khula of the Zunghar, to be an obstacle between himself and Russia. In 1619, he proposed that Russian forces attack Khara Khula from one side while he attacked from the other, so that the road between the Khotogoid and Russia would be opened.

The Oirat princes also tried to maintain relations with Russia. Both sides sent envoys, gave gifts, made promises, and tried to prevent the other from gaining Russian support. Russia replied that it would protect either side only if they swore allegiance to the tsar. In practice, both the Khotogoid and the Oirats attempted to use Russia as a rear ally in their struggle against one another.

A Russian envoy report from 1616 described Khalkha envoys collecting livestock tribute from the Oirats, including camels, horses, and sheep. The report indicates that the Jasagtu Khan line and the Khotogoid ruler claimed authority over the Oirats at that time. The later course of the war shows that this authority was contested and was broken by the Oirat victory of 1623.

== Wars with the Oirats ==
=== Background ===
The conflict between Ubashi Khong Tayiji and the Oirats belonged to a longer rivalry between the eastern Mongols and the Oirats after the fall of the Yuan dynasty. From the sixteenth century onward, Mongol and Khalkha campaigns pushed the Oirats westward from much of Mongolia. By the early seventeenth century, Oirat groups were concentrated around the Irtysh, Emil, Yamysh, Ala-Köl, and neighboring regions.

The Four Oirat Confederation emerged in this period as a loose military and political alliance of Oirat aristocracies, especially the Dörbet Oirat, Khoshut, Torghut, and Zunghar. It was not yet the centralized Dzungar Khanate of the later seventeenth and eighteenth centuries. Its princes acted as semi-independent rulers who cooperated in major wars but also competed among themselves.

The Oirat–Khotogoid conflict was driven by several connected issues: control of pasturelands, control of the Yenisei Kyrgyz and other Siberian frontier peoples, tribute collection, access to Russian trade, and the question of whether the Oirats would remain under Mongol pressure or act independently.

=== Oirat counterattack of 1608 ===
In the early seventeenth century, Ubashi attacked the Oirats and pushed them westward. Some Oirat groups moved closer to Siberian towns as a result of Khotogoid pressure. In 1608, Oirat nobles united their forces and launched a counterattack against him.

Russian reports state that in December 1608 the Oirat nobles told Russian envoys that they were preparing to attack the Khotogoid Altan Khan. The attack was successful. The Oirats pushed Ubashi back from the lands where he was wintering and forced him toward his earlier territory.

This counterattack did not end the conflict. Instead, it began a longer period of warfare in which both sides raided, retreated, sought allies, and tried to secure Russian support.

=== Renewed conflict, 1615–1619 ===
By the mid-1610s, several important Oirat leaders had moved northward or westward under pressure from the Khotogoid. Baibaghas Khan of the Khoshut was recorded near Tyumen and later near Tobolsk and Ufa. Khara Khula of the Zunghar moved between the Ob and Tom rivers, while other Oirat leaders appeared near Baraba, the Om, the Irtysh, and other Siberian frontier regions.

Khara Khula became one of Ubashi's most important opponents. He resisted Khotogoid expansion and tried to preserve Oirat influence over the peoples of southwestern Siberia. In 1619, both Ubashi and Khara Khula sent envoys to Moscow seeking Russian support against the other. Ubashi's message described Khara Khula as the main obstacle between himself and Russia and proposed a joint attack against him.

This diplomacy shows that the war was not simply a local tribal conflict. It was tied to the larger political transformation of Inner Asia, where Mongol, Oirat, Kazakh, and Russian interests overlapped.

=== Crisis of 1620–1622 ===
Around 1620, the Four Oirat Confederation faced a serious military crisis. Oirat forces attacked both the Kazakhs and the Khotogoid Mongols, but these campaigns failed. Kazakh forces under Esim Khan defeated Oirat troops, while Ubashi's Khotogoid forces defeated Oirat forces led by Khara Khula of the Zunghar and Mergen-Temene of the Torghut.

In one major clash, Khara Khula and Mergen-Temene attacked the Khotogoid center around Lake Uvs and returned with captives. Ubashi responded by dividing his forces and attacking them from more than one direction. Four thousand Khotogoid troops struck from the front, while another force of three thousand attacked from the rear. The Oirats were defeated, and Khara Khula fled northward. His wife and children were captured by Ubashi.

After these defeats, several Oirat groups moved toward the Ob, Tom, Chumysh, Ishim, Tobol, and Kamyshlov regions. By 1622, Khotogoid forces had reached or occupied the Lake Yamysh area, one of the important Oirat pasture and salt zones. The loss of this area was a major blow to the Oirats and helped provoke their united campaign of 1623.

=== Battle of 1623 ===
In 1623, the Oirat princes gathered their forces for a decisive campaign against Ubashi Khong Tayiji. Russian sources describe the Oirat forces assembling between the Ishim and Irtysh rivers and moving toward the Kamyshlov and Lake Yamysh region. The leaders involved included Dalai Taishi of the Dörbet, Baibaghas Khan of the Khoshut, Khoo-Örlög of the Torghut, Cöökör of the Khoshut, and other Oirat princes.

The immediate goal of the northern Oirat campaign was to recover the Yamysh region. Lake Yamysh was not only a pasture zone but also an important salt lake. Its occupation by the Khotogoid threatened the northern part of the Oirat domains and cut into the territory of Baibaghas Khan, whose sphere extended from the Yamysh area southward toward Ala-Köl. Baibaghas therefore became the main figure linking the northern and southern fronts of the war.

The Oirat literary tradition preserved in The Tale of Ubashi Khong Tayiji describes the war from a southern perspective. It places Oirat forces around the upper Irtysh, the Khoboq-Sair region, the Emil River, the Jinjilig River, and Lake Ala-Köl. In this account, Sain-Serdengki, son of Mangghad of the Dörbet, serves as the vanguard with two thousand soldiers; Sain Kiya of the Khoid is stationed near the source of the Irtysh with four thousand soldiers; Khara Khula of the Zunghar commands six thousand; Sain-Temene Batur, identified with Mergen-Temene of the Torghut, commands eight thousand; and Baibaghas Khan of the Khoshut is positioned in the rear with sixteen thousand soldiers.

The northern and southern accounts describe different geographic zones but belong to the same wider campaign. In the north, the Oirats moved from the Ishim and Kamyshlov region toward Lake Yamysh. In the south, Oirat forces faced Ubashi around the Emil, Jinjilig, and Ala-Köl region. This suggests that the war of 1623 was not a single small engagement, but a broad campaign across the frontier between the Khotogoid and Oirat domains.

According to the Oirat tradition, Ubashi crossed the Irtysh and marched south through the Shara-Khulusun area near the mouth of the Emil River before reaching the headwaters of the Bacai and Jinjilig rivers, where he stationed his troops. In the final battle, the Oirats defeated the Khotogoid forces, and Ubashi was killed by Sain-Serdengki of the Dörbet.

The Oirat victory of 1623 reversed the Khotogoid advance. It allowed the Oirats to recover territories around and south of Lake Yamysh and ended the strongest phase of Khotogoid pressure over the Oirat confederation. The conflict between the Khotogoid and the Oirats continued in some form until 1628, but after Ubashi's death the balance of power shifted in favor of the Oirats.

== Death and succession ==
Ubashi Khong Tayiji was killed in 1623 after his defeat by the united Oirat forces. He was succeeded by his son Badma Erdeni Khong Tayiji, the second Altan Khan of the Khalkha. The next ruler in the line was Rinčin, also known as Lobsang Tayiji, who became the third Altan Khan.

The Khotogoid–Oirat conflict did not immediately disappear after Ubashi's death. According to material connected with the Mongol-Oirat Code of 1640, hostilities between the Khotogoid Mongols and the Oirats lasted from the fire-snake year to the earth-dragon year, corresponding to 1617–1628. In 1629, under pressure from Ligdan Khan of the Chahar, Ubashi's successor Ombo-Erdene reconciled with the Oirats.

== Legacy ==
Ubashi Khong Tayiji was one of the most important Khalkha rulers on the western frontier in the early seventeenth century. His campaigns represented the last major phase of Khalkha and Khotogoid pressure against the Oirats before the rise of later Oirat powers.

His defeat in 1623 was a turning point. It weakened Khotogoid influence over the Oirats and helped the Four Oirat Confederation consolidate its position in the Irtysh, Yamysh, and Ala-Köl regions. The Oirats' victory also contributed to the later political development of the western Mongolian steppe, although the centralized Dzungar Khanate emerged only later in the seventeenth century.

The Khotogoid–Oirat wars also affected the Russian advance into southwestern Siberia. Ubashi and the Oirat princes both tried to use Russia as a diplomatic and military counterweight against each other. Their rivalry created opportunities for Russian forts and officials to expand influence among the peoples of the Siberian frontier. As a result, the conflict contributed to the gradual weakening of Mongol and Oirat control over parts of southwestern Siberia.

Ubashi's descendants remained known as the Altan Khans of the Khalkha. Although formally connected with the Jasagtu Khan line of the Right Wing Khalkha, the Altan Khans formed a powerful Khotogoid branch whose history was closely tied to the Oirat frontier and to Russian Siberian relations.

== Family ==
Ubashi Khong Tayiji belonged to the Borjigin dynasty. His known line of descent was:

- Dayan Khan
  - Geresenje
    - Asiqai
      - Tümendara Dayiching
        - Ubashi Khong Tayiji
          - Badma Erdeni Khong Tayiji

His son and successor was Badma Erdeni Khong Tayiji, the second Altan Khan of the Khalkha. Badma Erdeni was followed by Rinčin, also known as Lobsang Tayiji, the third Altan Khan.

== See also ==
- Altan Khan of the Khalkha
- Khotogoid
- Zasagt Khan
- Oirat Confederation
- Oirats
- Kharkhul
- Dzungar Khanate
- Yenisei Kyrgyz
- Uvs Lake
