= Tara, Republic of Bashkortostan =

Tara Тара
- Selo
- Location within Bashkortostan Location within Russia
- Coordinates: 53°43′N 57°22′E
- Country: Russia
- Region: Bashkortostan
- District: Beloretsky District
- Time zone: UTC+5:00

Tara (Russian: Тара) is a rural locality (a selo) in Tukansky Selsoviet, Beloretsky District, Bashkortostan, Russia. The population was 59 as of 2010. There are 6 streets.

== Geography ==
Tara is located 95 km southwest of Beloretsk (the district's administrative centre) by road. Zapadnaya Maygashlya is the nearest rural locality.
