= Siege of Yamyshev =

1716 conflict in Pavlodar Region, Kazakhstan

- Part of the Dzungar–Russian conflicts of Russian conquest of Central Asia
Date	1716
Location	Pavlodar Region, Kazakhstan
Result	Dzungar victory: Failure of Buchholz's expedition; Sack of Russian military supplies; Destruction of the Fortress

Belligerents
Dzungar Khanate	Tsardom of Russia

Commanders and leaders
(Dzungar Khanate) Tseren Dhondup	(Tsardom of Russia) Buchholz

Strength
10,000	Unknown

Casualties and losses
Unknown	3,000: 2,300 starved or from disease; 700 POW

The Siege of Yamyshev was a military siege by the Dzungar Khanate against the Tsardom of Russia's expedition led by Buchholz. This was from orders by the Peter I of Russia, to Buchholz in 1714. The goal was to capture the gold deposits of Erket (Yarkend). The expedition was a Russian failure.

Later, another expedition from Likharev arrived to Dzungaria; however, the Dzungars battled the Russian expedition force on the Lake Zaysan (1720), and set the boundaries between the Dzungars and the Russians.

== Background ==
In 1714, Buccholz received orders from to capture Erket (Yarkend)'s gold deposits. In 1715, a Russian detachment arrived to start the construction of the Yamyshev fortress, instead of going deeper as Buchholz sent a letter to Peter I that going further is dangerous with a small army—however the letter didn't arrive until August 7th of 1716. During that Tsewang Rabtan, the ruler of the Dzungar Khanate sent an ultimatum to Buchholz to leave — in which Buchholz had rejected the offer.

== Siege ==
On February 9th, Tsewang Rabtan had sent his brother, Tseren Dhondup to siege the fortress with forces of 10,000 men. On the siege, Russians had lost about 2,300 men from disease and starvation, as the Dzungars blocked Russian supply forces. In which they attacked a caravan from Tobolsk, seizing supplies and taking 700 men from them. Soon Buchholz had fled from the fortress as the Dzungars started demolishing the fortress and razed buildings and infrastructure and sacked the supplies present on the fortress.
