= Altan Khan of the Khalkha =

Mongol leaders (17th century)

Realm of the Altan Khan in 1636

The Altan Khans (or Golden Khans) ruled over the Khotogoids in northwestern Mongolia from about 1609 to 1691. They belonged to the Left Wing of the Khalkha Mongols. Although they claimed to be khans, Mongolian chronicles call them Khong Tayiji, which was a noble rank equivalent to prince.

== Background ==
After the death of Dayan Khan some time after 1517 his empire was split between his descendants and became a kind of family federation. His grandson, a different Altan Khan (1507–1582) of Tumet had successful military campaigns against the Oirats. Dayan Khan's youngest son, Gersendze Huangtaizi, was given lands approximately matching the territory of present-day Mongolia. By the early 17th century most of Outer Mongolia was held by his descendants. These formed four khanates, from west to east:

- The Altan Khan (great-grandson of Geresandza) in the far west.
- Dzasagtu-khan, khanate founded by Laikhor-khan, a cousin of the Altan Khan.
- Tüsheet Khan at Örgöö (ᠥᠷᠭᠦᠭᠡ/Өргөө, today Ulaanbaatar) founded by Abtai Sain Khan, another grandson. This was the senior branch.
- Sechen-khan at the eastern end of modern Mongolia, founded by Shului, a great-grandson.

The Altan Khan was important in c. 1609–1682. The Tushetu Khan, with his control of the religious capital, was long the leading figure in Khalkha.

In the 17th century, to the west, the Oirat Dzungar Khanate was gradually consolidated in modern-day Xinjiang; to the north, the Russians increased their hold over the Siberian forests; and, to the east, the Manchus moved south to conquer the Ming dynasty, eventually forming the Qing dynasty.

== Rulers ==
- Ubasi Khong Tayiji (Shului Ubasha Khong Tayiji) (?-1623) was the first to take the name Altan Khan. Ubasi was killed by the Oirats in 1623 and was succeeded by his son Badma Erdeni Khong Tayiji.
- Badma Erdeni Khong Tayiji (1623-?) his son. In 1652, he abdicated the throne and his son Erinchin Lobsang Tayiji succeeded.
- Erinchin Lobsang Tayiji (or Lobdzang or Rinchen Sayin Khong Tayiji) (ca.1658-91): In 1662 he attacked, captured and put to death his eastern neighbor, the Dzasagtu Khan. This led the senior Tushetu Khan (Chaghun Dorji) to form a league and drive out the Altan-khan. With the help of the Dzungar and Qing (divide and conquer), he was able to reinstate himself, but in 1682 he was captured by the Dzasagtu Khan. In 1691 he, and his khanate, disappeared from the records.
