= Battle of Zaysan (1720) =

Part of Dzungar-Russian conflicts

- Part of the Dzungar–Russian conflicts of Russian conquest of Central Asia
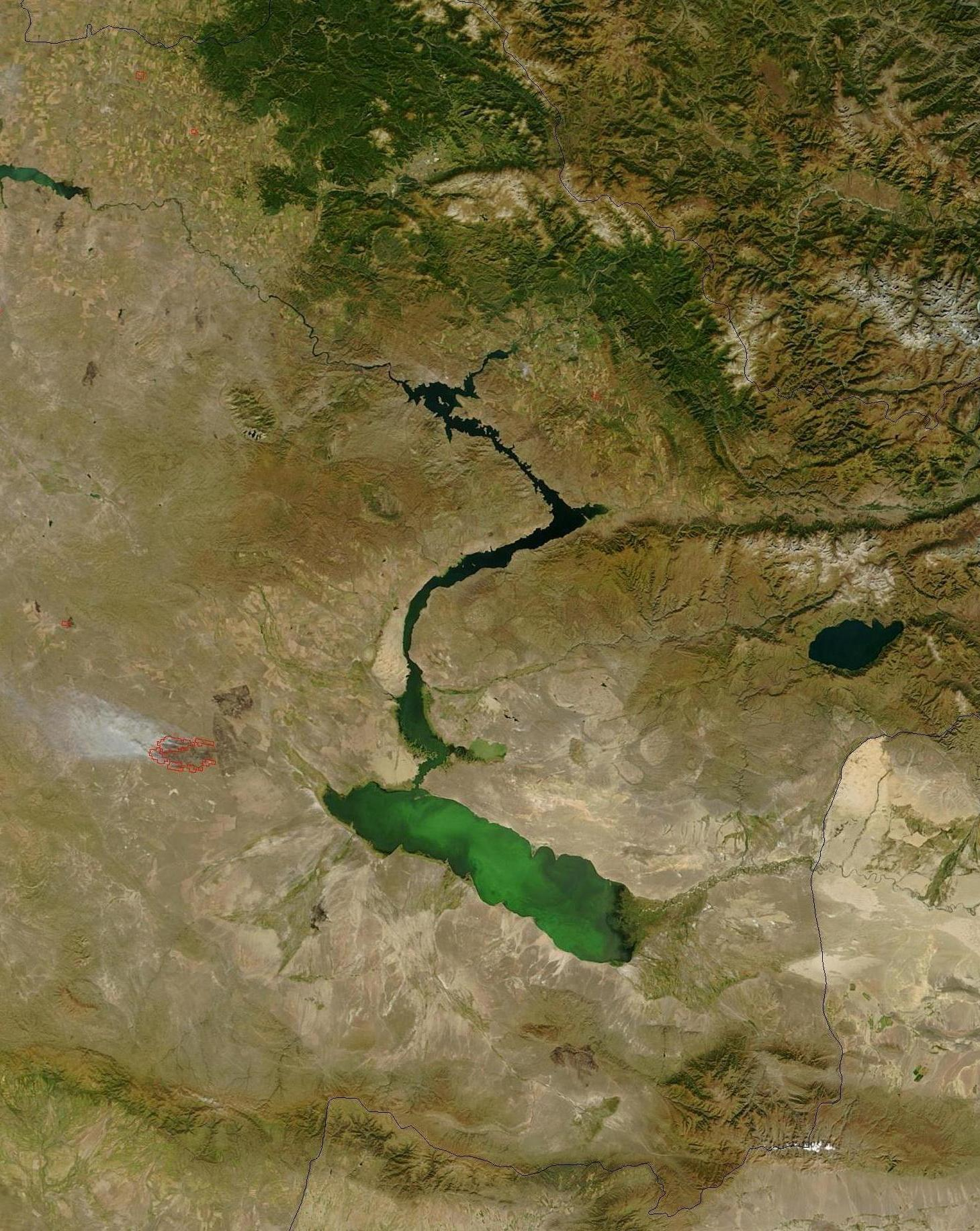
- View of the Lake
Date	1720
Location	Zaysan Lake, Kazakhstan
Result	Dzungar victory: Likharev's expedition fails
Territorial changes	Dzungar–Russian border fixed on the Yenisei and Irtysh River

Belligerents
Dzungar Khanate	Tsardom of Russia

Commanders and leaders
(Dzungar Khanate) Galdan Tseren	(Tsardom of Russia) Likharev

Strength
20,000	Unknown

The Battle of Zaysan was a military battle between the Dzungar Khanate and the Tsardom of Russia on the Lake Zaysan on 1720. This followed the failed expedition led by Buchholz who arrived in Yamyshevsky salt lake or on modern-day Pavlodar region. Seeking to find gold deposits in the city of Erket, where he constructed the Yamyshev fortress. However, Tsewang Rabtan—the Khong Tayiji of the Dzungar Khanate was irritated by the arrival of Russian troops and sieged the city for about 2 months. Which forced Buchholz to flee from the fortress and the destruction of the fortress as well. Soon an expedition later arrived in 1719, arriving at Lake Zaysan at 1720.

Tsewang had sent his son, Galdan Tseren with a force of 20,000 men to attack them as he was dealing with the Qing Dynasty on Tibet, and a possible Russian–Qing coalition against them. The Dzungars were equipped with bows, and with despite the Russian advantage of firearms, the Dzungars had managed to swarm their forces and cause Likharev to flee to Tobolsk.

The Dzungars later fixed their border with Russia on at the fort of Ust-Kamenogorsk, on the Irtysh river and the Yenisei river. Tsewang Rabtan also had requested the Russians for aid against the Qing, in which they refused as Tsewang had nothing to offer.
