= Tara, Russia =

Tara (Russian: Тара) is the name of several inhabited localities in Russia.

Urban localities

- Tara, Omsk Oblast, a town in Omsk Oblast; administratively incorporated as a town of oblast significance; 56°53′N 74°22′E

Rural localities

- Tara, Republic of Bashkortostan, a selo in Tukansky Selsoviet of Beloretsky District in the Republic of Bashkortostan; 53°44′N 57°22′E
