= Mongolian nobility =

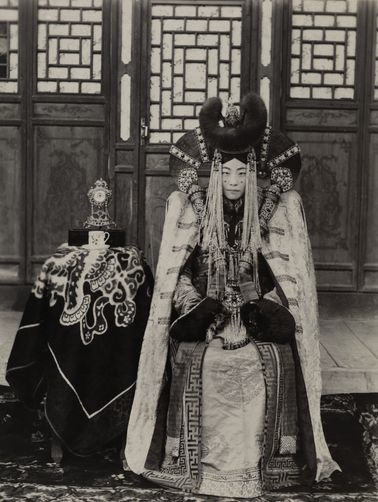
A Khalkha Mongol noblewoman (c. 1908)

The Mongolian nobility (Mongolian: ᠢᠵᠠᠭᠤᠷᠲᠠᠨ; yazgurtan; ᠰᠤᠷᠪᠤᠯᠵᠢᠲᠠᠨ survaljtan) arose between the 10th and 12th centuries, became prominent in the 13th century, and essentially governed Mongolia until the early 20th century.

Many Mongol elites would end up assimilating into their Turkic subjects, adopting Islam and Turkic culture while retaining Mongol political and legal institutions. These new Turco-Mongol elites would establish several successor states across the Muslim World.

The Mongolian word for nobility, Yazgurtan, derives from the Mongol word yazgur, meaning "root".

== Mongol Empire (1206–1368) and Yuan dynasty (1271–1368) ==
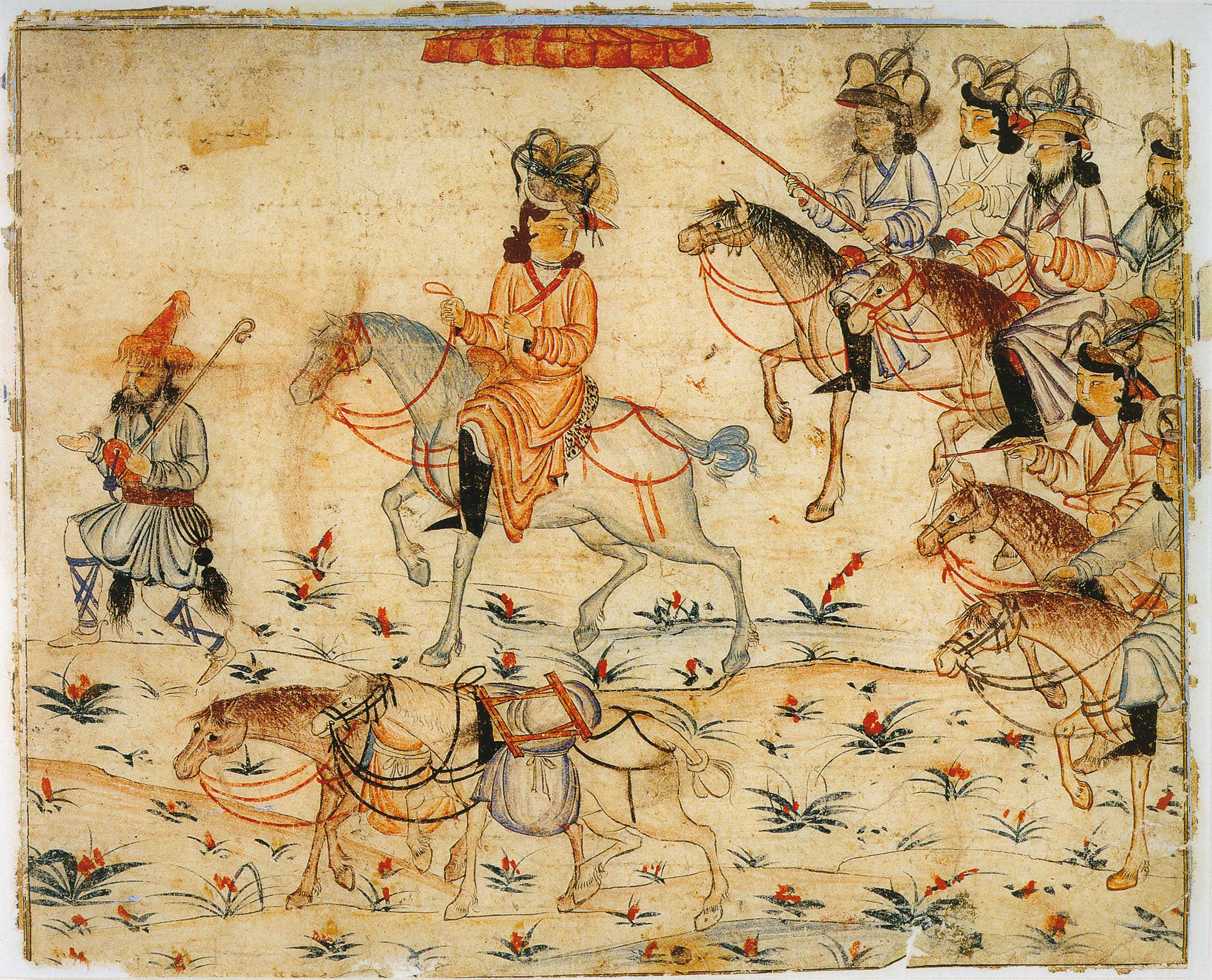
A Mongol ruler on his way through the empire. Illustration of Rashid al-Din's Jami' al-tawarikh.

=== Nobility titles ===
- Khaan (Khagan, ᠬᠠᠭᠠᠨ), the supreme ruler of the Mongol Empire.
- Noyon (ᠨᠣᠶᠠᠨ), meaning "King of a State", a ruler of a vassal/tributary state under the Mongol Empire.
- Jinong (ᠵᠢᠨᠤᠩ), meaning "Crown Prince", the heir apparent of the Great Khaan. During the Yuan dynasty, the Jinong resided in Kharakhorum and administered ceremonial events.
- Khan Khuu (ᠬᠠᠨ ᠬᠦᠦ), meaning "Prince".
- Mirza, a Persian term meaning "Prince".

=== Military Ranks ===
- Boyan, the military general to the Khan, given an Ordu to command.
- Orlok, commander of an Ordu, a unit of 30,000 or more troops.
- Tumetu-iin Noyan, meaning "Commander of a Tümen". A tümen was a military unit of 10,000 troops. There were initially only nine tümens in the Mongol Empire in 1206, but by 1368 there were 40 Mongol tümens and four Oirat tümens.
- Mingghan-u Noyan, meaning "Commander of a Mingghan". A mingghan was a military unit of 1,000 troops.
- Jagutu-iin Darga, meaning "Commander of a Zuut". A zuut was a military unit of 100 troops.
- Arban-u Darga, meaning "Commander of an Aravt". An aravt was a military unit of 10 troops.
- Nokud, the basic troop unit of the Mongolian army, Mongol warriors themselves were, considered nokud, for example.
- Kheshig, an imperial guard unit, composed of nobility and nokuds.
- Cherbi, a title for a Kheshig commander.
- Bahadur, noble Mongol warriors, of whom were likely to be drafted into the Kheshig.
- Yurtchi, the quartermaster for an Ordu. A Yurtchi would have to manage, organise equipment, and other duties to keep the Ordu running smoothly.
- Beg, a Turkic term meaning "Chieftain".

=== Female titles ===
- Khatun (ᠬᠠᠲᠤᠨ; 可敦), meaning "Empress" or "Queen".
- Begum or Behi (别姬), referred to a noble lady, a Turkic term used to refer to the wife or daughter of a bey.
- Gonji (ᠭᠦᠩᠵᠦ; 公主), referred to a princess or noble lady.

== Northern Yuan dynasty (1368–1635) ==
=== Nobility titles ===
- Khaan (Khagan), the supreme ruler of the Northern Yuan Empire.
- Khan, a title for a Mongol feudal lord. By the mid-16th century, there were a number of khans in Mongolia as local feudal lords started calling themselves khan. Note that this khan is different from khaan; khaan was reserved for the supreme ruler only.
- Jinong (ᠵᠢᠨᠤᠩ, the crown prince or heir apparent of the Khaan. He resided in the Inner Mongolia region. From the 15th century, the title became a hereditary one and was no longer reserved exclusively for the heir apparent of the Khaan.
- Khong Tayiji (ᠬᠤᠨ
  ᠲᠠᠶᠢᠵᠢ;, originated from the Chinese term huangtaizi (皇太子; "Imperial Crown Prince"). It was used to refer to a descendant of Genghis Khan who had his own fief.
- Taiji (ᠲᠠᠶᠢᠵᠢ;), a title for a descendant of Genghis Khan.
- Wang, a title for a descendant of Qasar or any of Genghis Khan's brothers who had his own fief.
- Taishi (ᠲᠠᠢᠱᠢ; Grand Preceptor), a title for a noble of non-Borjigit descent who had his own fief. Such nobles included the descendants of Tumetu-iin Noyans.

=== Female titles ===
- Taihu, the Khaan's consort.
- Khatun, referred to a queen consort or noble lady of equivalent status.
- Gonji, referred to a princess or noble lady of equivalent status.
- Behichi (Beiji), referred to a princess consort or noble lady of equivalent status.

== Qing dynasty (1691–1911) and Bogd Khaganate (1911–1924) ==
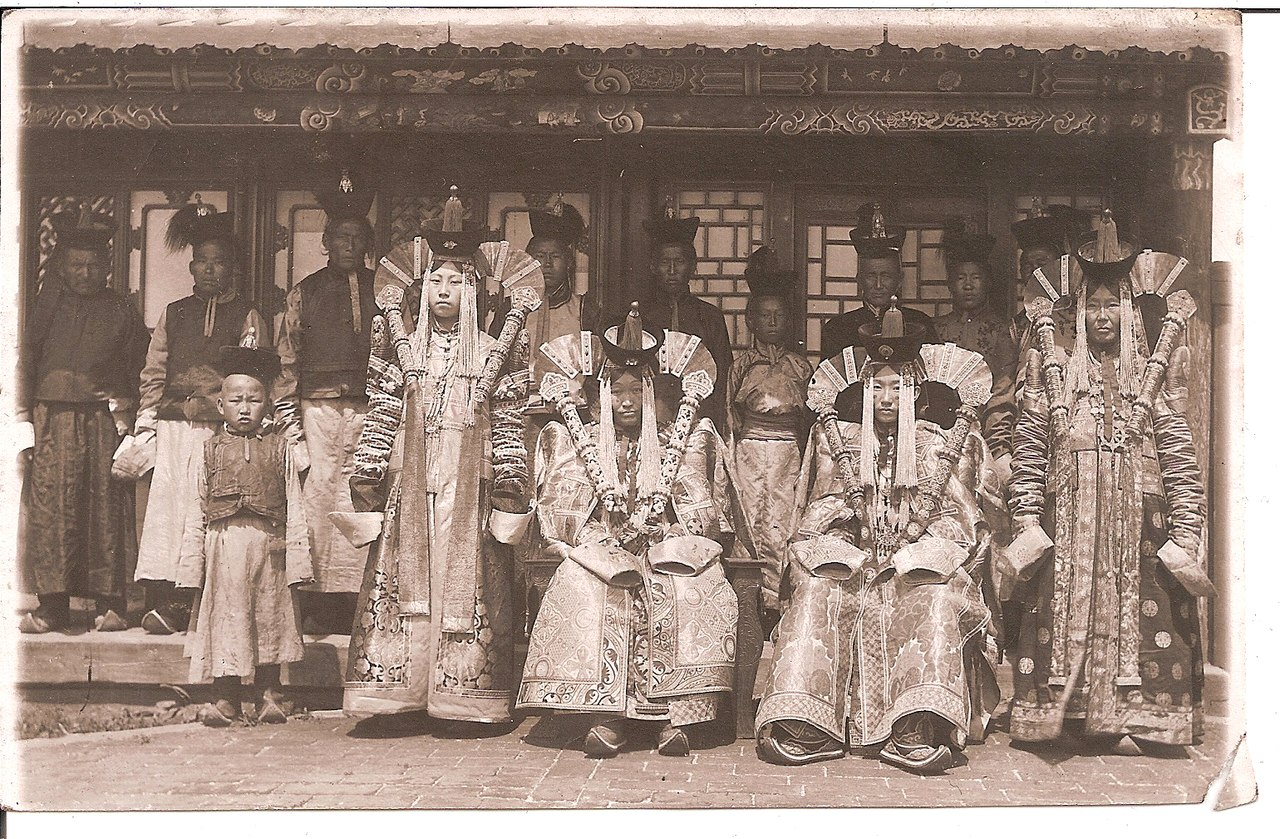
Ladies at the court of the Bogd Khan.

=== Nobility titles ===
- Khan (Хан), referred to the lord of a hoshun. Note that this title is of a lower status than the Khaan or Khagan used in earlier times. Among the Khalkha Mongols, there were four khans: Tushietu Khan, Zasagtu Khan, Secen Khan and Sain Noyan Khan. In the Kobdo region, there were two khans: Tögs Hülüg Dalai Khan and Ünen Zorigtu Khan. Despite the association of the four aimags with these titles, the khan's power was restricted to only within his hoshun. The khan would communicate with the Qing Emperor just as any other Jasagh (hoshun lord).
- Ashan-i hafan (男爵; equivalent of baron), a special title awarded to foreigners (e.g. Alexander Zanzer I) during the reign of Bogd Khan. The baron drew an annual income of 3,500 taels of silver and 60 rolls of silk.

The following six titles were the same as those used by members of the Manchu nobility. (See here for details.) These titles were usually hereditary, and were decorated with styles to form a longer title (e.g. Khorchin Jasagh Darhan Chin-Wang 科爾沁扎薩克達爾罕親王) to indicate which hoshun the noble was from.

- Chin Wang (ᠴᠢᠨ ᠸᠠᠩ 親王), referred to the lord of a hoshun. A chin wang drew an annual income of 2,600 taels of silver and 40 rolls of silk, and held 60 serfs.
- Giyün Wang (ᠭᠢᠶᠦᠢᠨ ᠸᠠᠩ 郡王), referred to the lord of a hoshun. A giyün wang drew an annual income of 1,200–2,000 taels of silver and 15–25 rolls of silk, and held 50 serfs.
- Beile (ᠪᠡᠶᠢᠯᠡ 貝勒), referred to the lord of a hoshun. A beile drew an annual income of 600 taels of silver and 13 rolls of silk, and held 40 serfs.
- Beis (ᠪᠡᠶᠢᠰᠡ 貝子), referred to the lord of a hoshun. A beis drew an annual income of 500 taels of silver and 10 rolls of silk.
- Tushiye Gong (ᠲᠦᠰᠢᠶ᠎ᠡ
  ᠬᠦᠩ 鎮國公), referred to the lord of a hoshun. A tushiye gong drew an annual income of 300 taels of silver and nine rolls of silk.
- Tusalagchi Gong (ᠲᠤᠰᠠᠯᠠᠭᠴᠢ
  ᠬᠦᠩ 輔國公), referred to the lord of a hoshun. A tusalagchi gong drew an annual income of 200 taels of silver and seven rolls of silk.
- Hohi Taiji (ᠲᠠᠢᠵᠢ 台吉) referred to a Mongol noble who did not hold any of the above six titles. It was subdivided into four ranks:
  - Terigun Zereg-un Taiji (ᠲᠡᠷᠢᠭᠦᠨ
    ᠵᠡᠷᠭᠡ ᠢᠢᠨ
    ᠲᠠᠢᠵᠢ ), first-rank hohi taiji who was eligible for a hereditary lordship over a hoshun. He drew an annual income of 100 taels of silver and four rolls of silk.
  - Ded Zereg-un Taiji (ᠳᠡᠳ᠋
    ᠵᠡᠷᠭᠡ ᠢᠢᠨ
    ᠲᠠᠢᠵᠢ ), second-rank hohi taiji who was also eligible for a hereditary lordship over a hoshun. He drew an annual income of 90 taels of silver and three rolls of silk.
  - Gutugaar Zereg-un Taiji (ᠭᠤᠲᠤᠭᠠᠷ
    ᠵᠡᠷᠭᠡ ᠢᠢᠨ
    ᠲᠠᠢᠵᠢ ), third-rank hohi taiji.
  - Dötugeer Zereg-un Taiji (ᠳᠥᠲᠦᠭᠡᠷ
    ᠵᠡᠷᠭᠡ ᠢᠢᠨ
    ᠲᠠᠢᠵᠢ), fourth-rank hohi taiji who drew an annual income of 40 taels of silver and held four serfs.

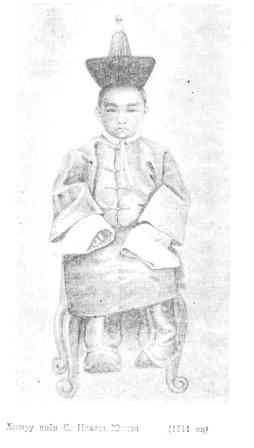
A Mongolian noble child in 1914

=== Generic titles ===
Apart from the above ranks, the nobles were also divided into two types:

- Töröl Taiji (literally "related nobles"), members of the 'Altan Urug' and descendants of Genghis Khan.
- Khariyatu Taiji (literally "subject nobles"), descendants of Qasar, Belgutei and Genghis Khan's brothers, or of Tooril Khan and Tumetu-iin Noyans.

Other titles used to refer to Mongolian nobles include:

- A-ge (ᠠᠭᠡ 阿哥), a son of a noble family.
- Tabunang (ᠲᠠᠪᠤᠨᠠᠩ 塔布囊), a son-in-law of a noble family.

=== Non-noble titles ===
- Soumon Albatu (сумын албат), referred to a serf in general
- Hamjilga (хамжлага), referred to a serf of a noble family
- Shabi (шавь), referred to a servant of a hotogtu (ᠬᠤᠲᠤᠬᠲᠤ; a title awarded by the Dalai Lama or Panchen Lama)

== See also ==
- History of Mongolia
- List of Mongol states
- Royal and noble ranks of the Qing dynasty
- Timeline of Mongolian history
- Mirza dynasty
