= Altanbulag, Selenge =

District in Selenge Province, Mongolia

Coordinates: 50°19′00″N 106°29′39″E

Altanbulag District Алтанбулаг сум ᠠᠯᠲᠠᠨᠪᠤᠯᠠᠭᠰᠤᠮᠤ
- District
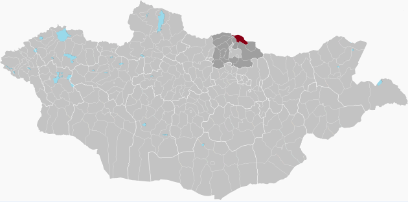
- Altanbulag District in Mongolia
- Country: Mongolia
- Province: Selenge Province

Area
  - Total: 2,100.30 km^{2} (810.93 sq mi)
- Time zone: UTC+8 (UTC + 8)
- Climate: Dwb

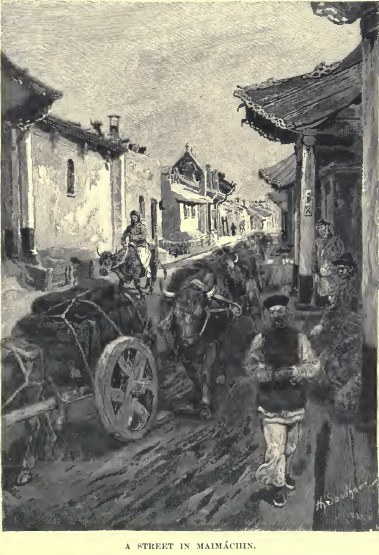
Altanbulag, 1885

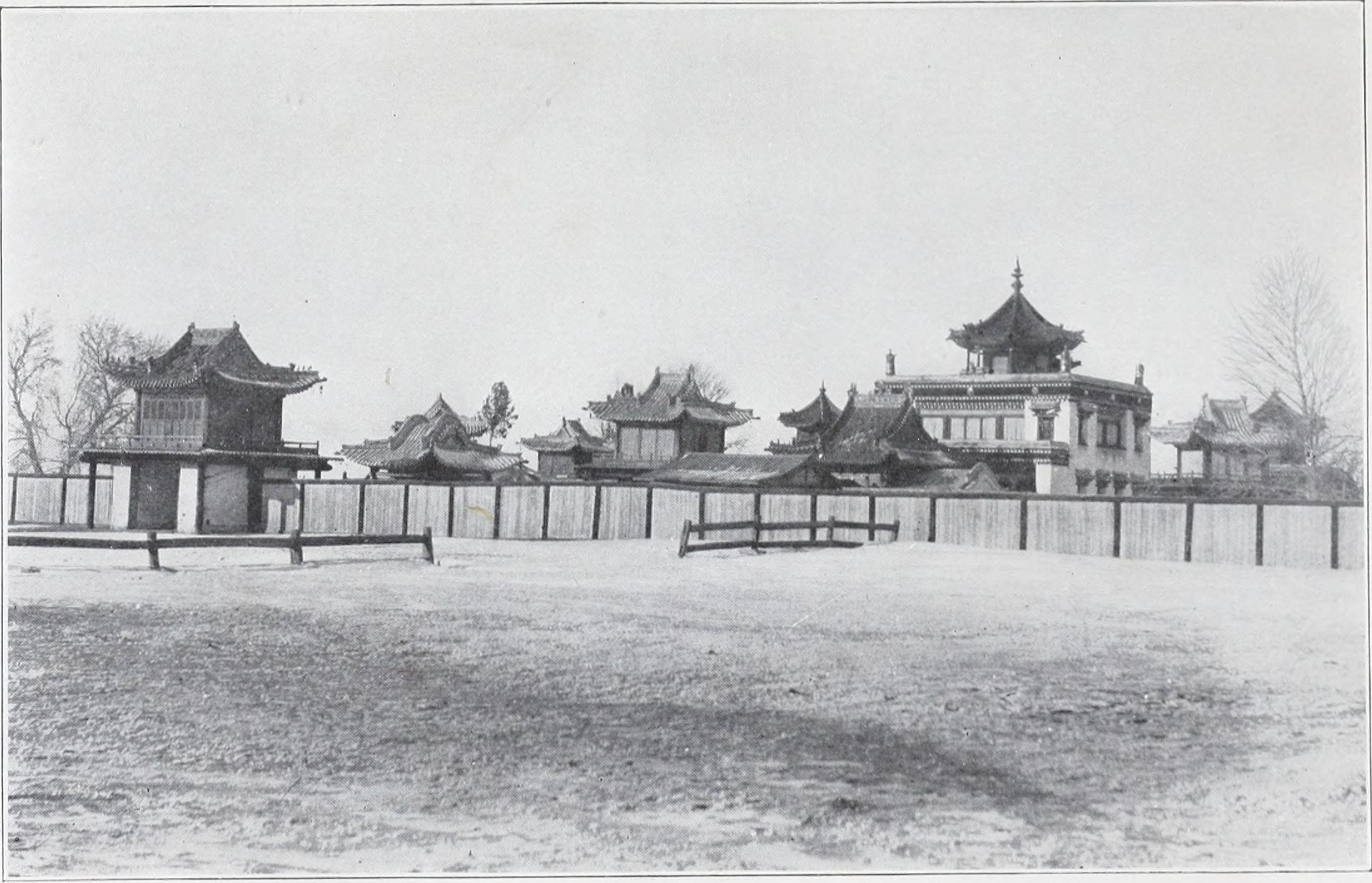
Altanbulag, 1910

Altanbulag (Mongolian: Алтанбулаг [áɬtʰəmpʊ́ɮəq]; lit. 'Golden Spring') is a district of Selenge Province in northern Mongolia. It is located about 25 km from the provincial capital of Sükhbaatar, on the border with Russia opposite the town of Kyakhta. Altanbulag is the location of the Altanbulag Free Trade Zone (Алтанбулаг худалдааны чөлөөт бүс, Altanbulag khudaldaanii chölööt büs).

== History ==
Altanbulag began as a trading outpost across the Kyakhta River from the Russian town of Kyakhta during Qing rule of Mongolia in 1730. The name of that city was called Maimaicheng (Mongolian: Худалдаачин, lit: City of Buying and Selling) at the first and later renamed to Kyakhta (Mongolian: Хиагт Khiagt). Also people used other names such as "Mongolian Khyahta" and "Southern Kyakhata".

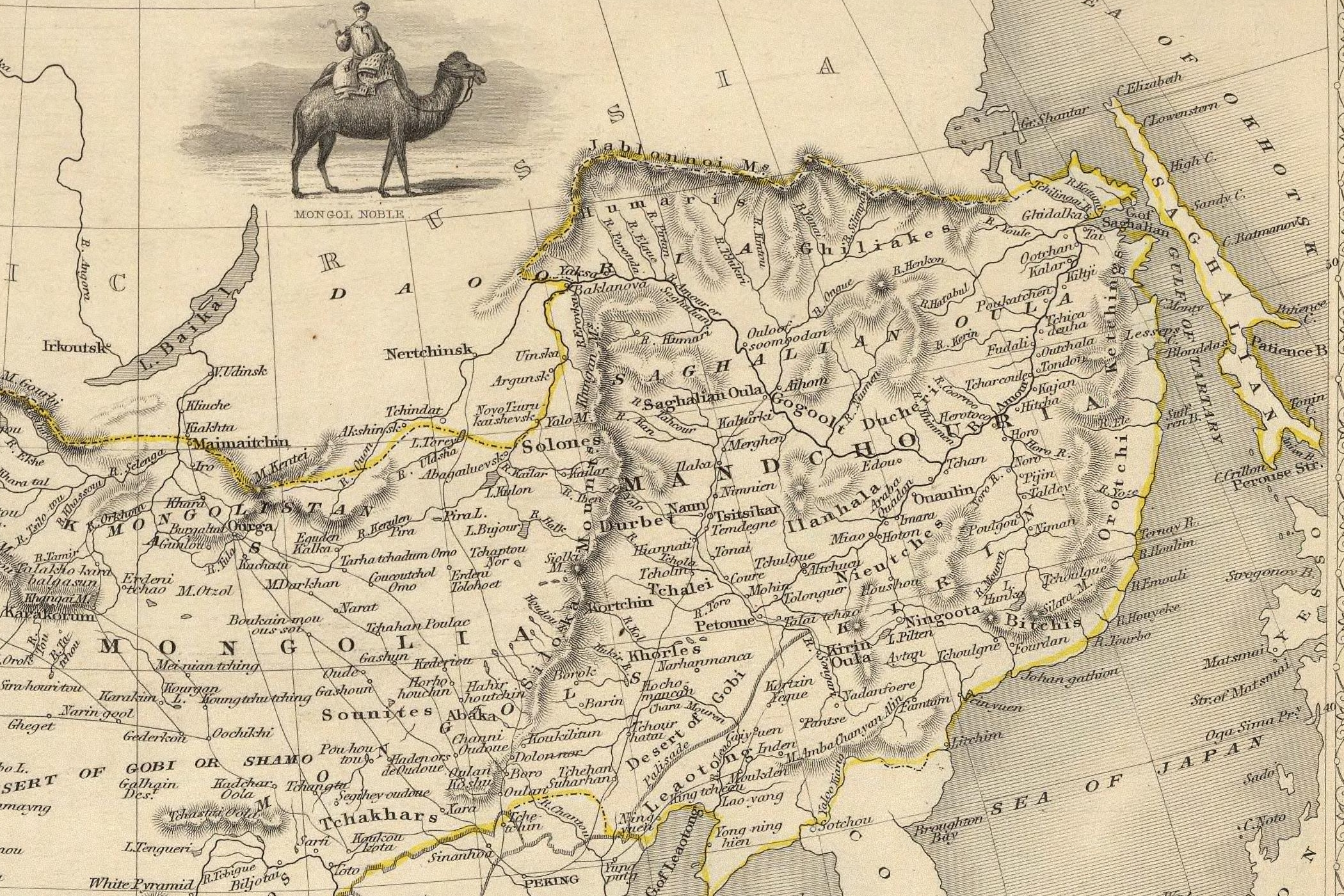
The twin towns of Kyakhta and Maimaicheng can be seen on this 1851 map, on the shortest route from Irkutsk to Peking

Following the Treaty of Kyakhta in 1727 each side built a trading post on its side of the border. Construction began in 1730. It was perhaps 500 to 700 feet south of Kyakhta, upstream on the small Kyakhta River. The town was square, with wooden walls and, after 1756, a three-foot wide ditch. Each wall had a gate which led to two major streets which intersected in the center. Each gate had a 25-foot watchtower manned by members of the Mongol garrison. The main avenues were about 25 feet wide, but the other streets and alleys were narrow. The larger houses had interior courtyards where trading was done. These courtyards were generally better kept than the public areas. The southwestern quarter of town was occupied by "Bukharans" as the Russians called traders from Central Asia. Women were forbidden to live in the town, apparently to keep Chinese merchants from becoming permanent residents. The rule was evaded but still in force in 1908. The post was administered by the 'Dzgarguchei' who was replaced by the Lifanyuan every two years. For some purposes the Dzarguchei dealt with the Tushetu Khan in Urga who was partly supervised by a Manchu resident.

On 13 March 1921, a Soviet-backed People's Provisional Government of Mongolia was established at Altanbulag. This government went on to oust the government of Roman Ungern von Sternberg and later formed the Mongolian People's Republic in 1924.

== Names ==
Today, the town is known as Altanbulag in both the Mongolian and Buryat languages.

During the Qing dynasty, the town was known as Maimaicheng (Mongolian: Наймаа хот (Худалдаачин), Naimaa khot, Наймаачин (Худалдаачин), Naimaachin, Маймаа хот, imaa khot, Маймаачин, Maimaachin, etc.; Маймачен in Russian), City of Buying and Selling in English) which derived from the Chinese name Mǎimàichéng. In Mongolian, it was known as Övör Khiagt (Өвөр Хиагт, South Kyakhta).

== Administrative divisions ==
The district is divided into three bags, which are:

- Burgedei
- Suvarga
- Tsukh

== See also ==
- Kyakhta trade
