= Lorenz Lange =

Swedish diplomat and explorer (c. 1690 – 1752)

Lorenz or Lorents Lange (Russian: Лоренц (Лаврентий) Ланг; c. 1690 – 1752) was a Swedish explorer and diplomat in Russian service. He was an official in 18th-century Siberia who dealt with Russo-Chinese trade and diplomacy. His reports were a major influence on Russian policy and an important early source of European knowledge of Siberia, Mongolia and China. He is usually said to have been a cornet in the Swedish cavalry who was taken prisoner at the Battle of Poltava in 1709.

At this time, Russo-Chinese trade and diplomacy went through the western border to Manchuria since Mongolia was not fully under Chinese control. When the Manchus gained control of Mongolia after the First Oirat-Manchu War, this created a long undefined border and opened a more practical trade route through the future Kyakhta.

Lange entered Russian service in 1712 as an engineer lieutenant. In 1715–1717 he was sent by Peter the Great as a special envoy to China, his mission being to promote Russian commercial interests. A Scottish medical doctor, Thomas Garvine, accompanied him and treated the Kangxi Emperor of China. His journal was one of the most important early European descriptions of the Gobi Desert. In 1719 he returned to Peking on the staff of the Ismailov mission and lived there as a trade agent until 1722 when the Manchus blocked trade to force a settlement of the Mongolian border. At about this time he accompanied Tulishen to the border to investigate the problem of "deserters", as the Manchus called Mongols who crossed the border without permission. In 1724 he was appointed to negotiate with the Manchus, but the next year he was made second to the more senior Sava Vladislavich. This led to the Treaty of Kyakhta in 1727.

He accompanied the state caravans from Kyakhta to Peking in 1727, 1731 and 1736. Lange was made vice-governor of Irkutsk (1739–1749) and met many of the famous explorers of the time, including Vitus Bering, Johann Georg Gmelin and George Wilhelm Steller. In 1739, he proposed that Siberian trade be given over to a private monopoly on the model of the Dutch East India Company. The proposal was accepted by the government, but had to be dropped when no merchants could be found to invest in it.

== Works and collections ==
His journal of his 1715–1717 travels was first published in German as part of Friedrich Christian Weber's "Das veränderte Russland", and translated into English as "Journal of Laurence Lange's Travels to China" in 1723. A French report of his 1720-22 sojourn appeared in 1726, an English translation in 1763. The Izmailov mission was described by Georg Johann Unverzagt (1725). His state caravan journeys were reported on in Peter Simon Pallas' "Neue Nordische Beyträge" (1781).

During his travels to China Lange acquired an important collection of objects, which were added to the collections of the Imperial Kunstkamera in St. Peterburg. Gottlieb Siegfried Bayer described these objects in his "Museum Sinicum" (1730).

== Literature ==
- Lange, Lorenz, Reise nach China. Mit einem Nachwort von Conrad Grau und 12 zeitgenössischen Illustrationen. Berlin: Akademie-Verlag 1986. Review by Harmut Walravens, Berlin, NOAG 1989: http://www.uni-hamburg.de/oag/noag/noag_1989_rez_04.pdf
- Lange, Lorenz, Journal of Laurence Lange's Travels to China. In: Friedrich Christian Weber, The Present State of Russia. London: Taylor, vol. 2, 1723.
- Lange, Lorenz, Journal de la residence du Sieur Lange, agent […] à la cour de la Chine. Leyde [Leiden] 1726.
- Unverzagt, Georg Johann, Die Gesandtschaft Ihro Käyserl. Majest. von Groß-Rußland an den Sinesischen Käyser. Lübeck: Schmidt, 1725.
- Lorenz Lange, Journal of the Residence of Mr. de Lange, Agent of his Imperial Majesty of all the Russias, Peter the Great, at the Court of Pekin, During the Years 1721 & 1722. In: John Bell, Travels from St. Petersburg in Russia to Diverse Parts of Asia. Vol. 2, 1763, pp. 169–321. Translated from the French report of 1726.
- Lange, Lorenz, in Peter Simon Pallas (Hg.) Neue Nordische Beyträge 2 (1781): Tagebuch einer in den Jahren 1727 und 1728 über Kjachta nach Peking unter Anführung des Agenten Lorenz Lange gethanen Karawanenreise, pp. 83–159; Tagebuch einer im Jahr 1736 unter Anführung des Kanzleyraths Lange und des Commissars Firsof von Zuruchaitu durch die Mongoley nach Peking verrichteten Karawanenreise, pp. 160–207.

== Sources ==
- "Ланг, Лоренц" . Brockhaus and Efron Encyclopedic Dictionary (in Russian). 1906.
- Foust, Clifford M, "Muscovite and Mandarin: Russia's Trade with China and its Setting, 1727-1805", 1969
- Mancall, Mark, Russia and China: Their Diplomatic Relations to 1728. Cambridge, MA: Harvard University Press, 1971.
