= China proper =

Geopolitical term

China proper 中國本土 (Chinese)
- Region
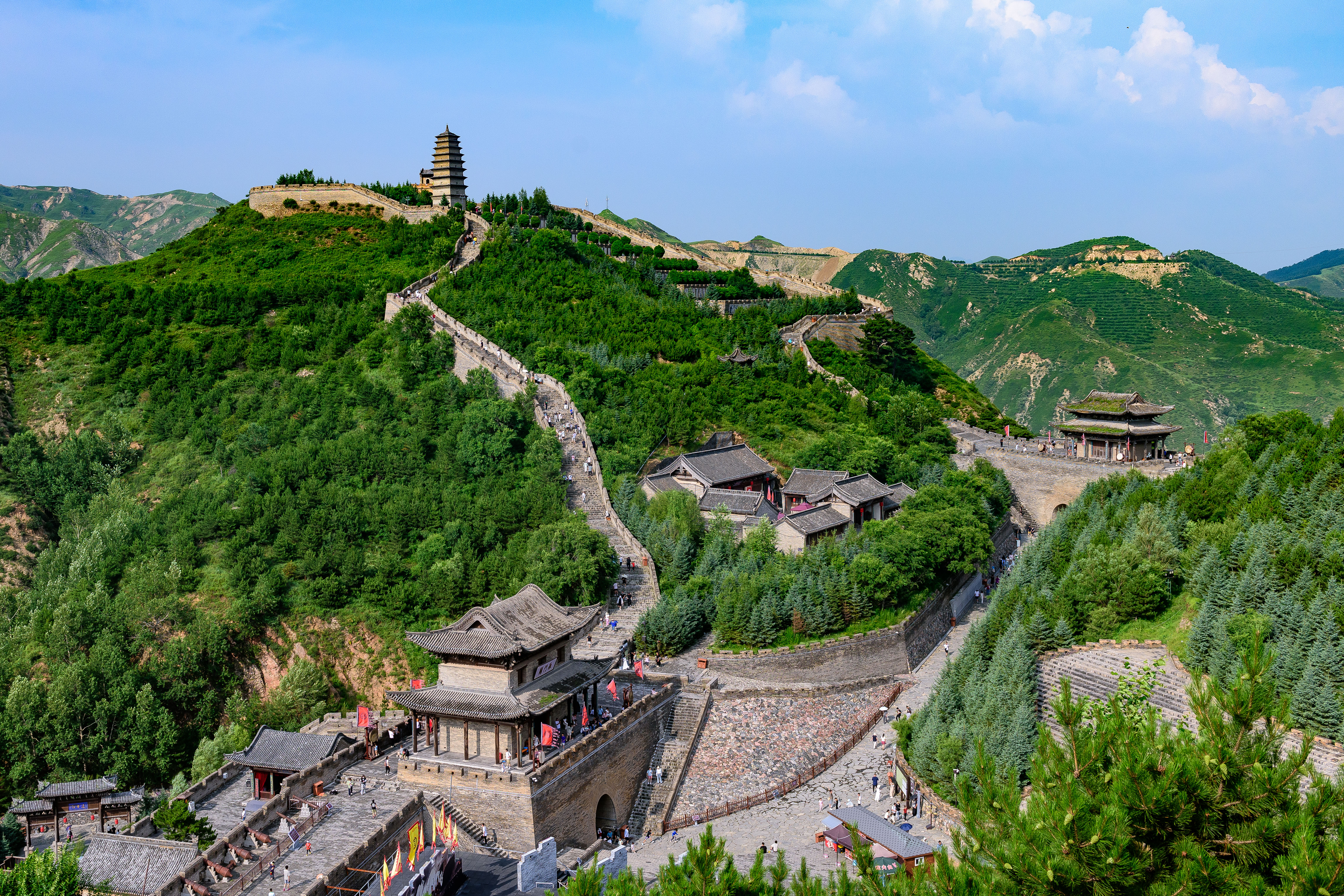
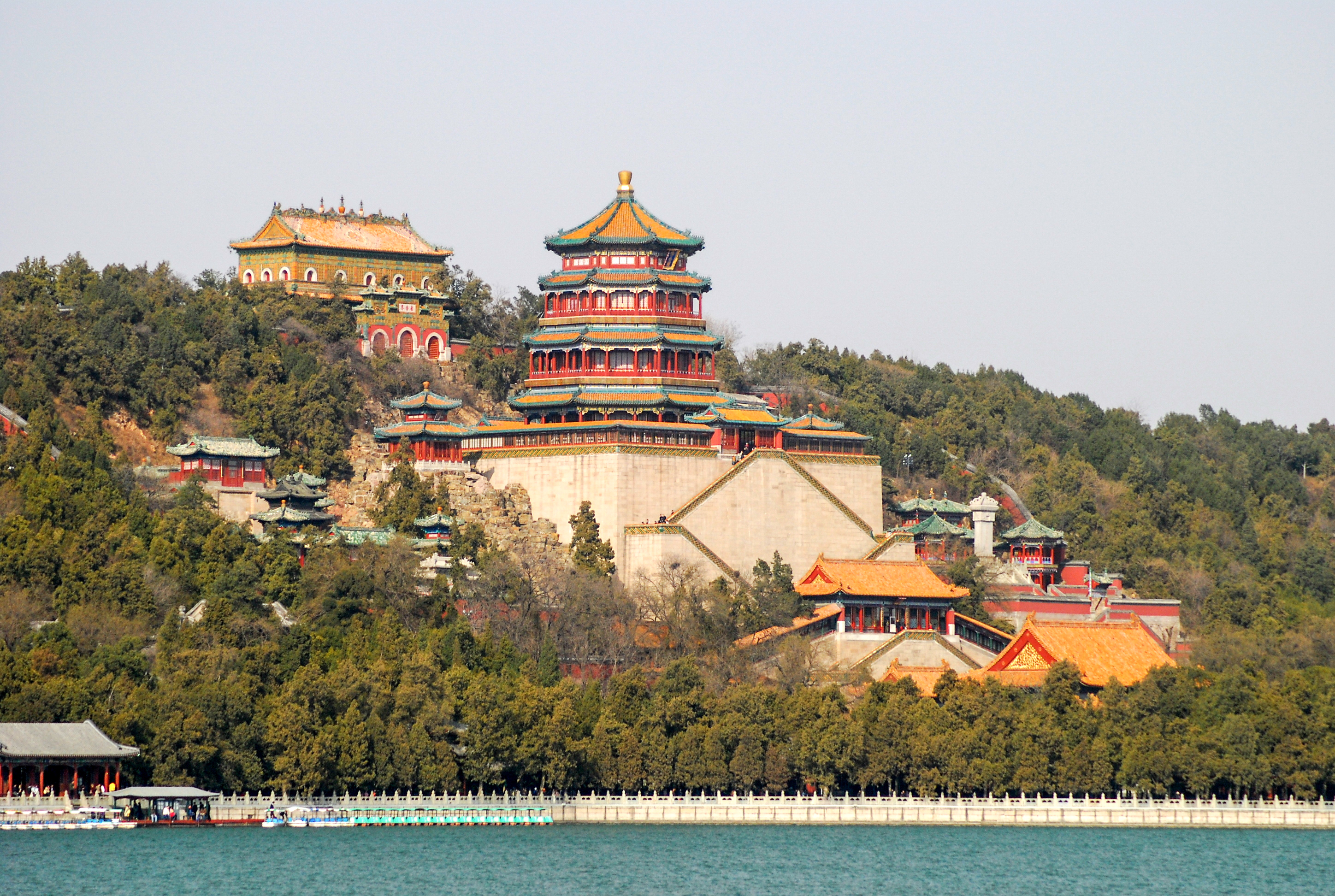
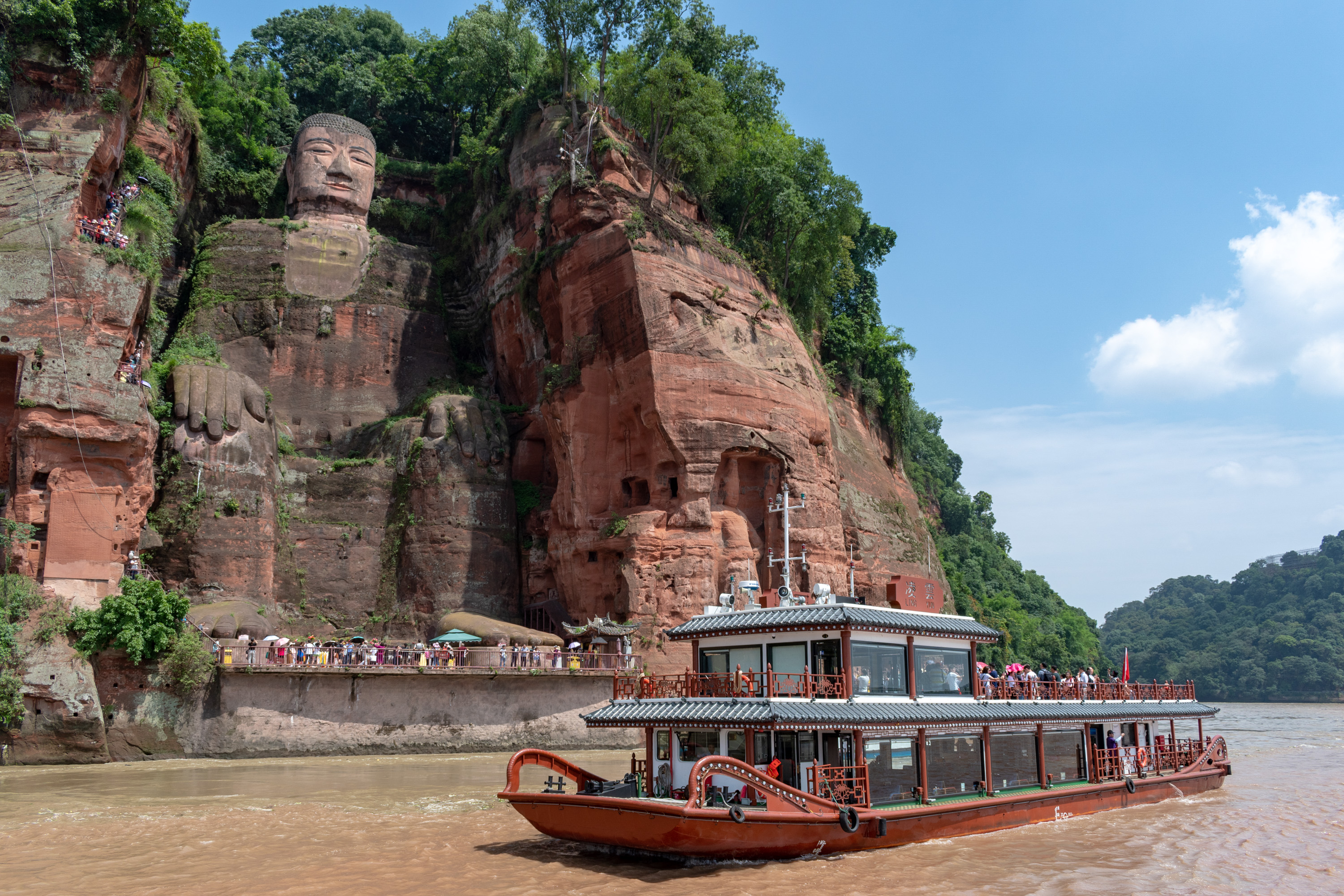
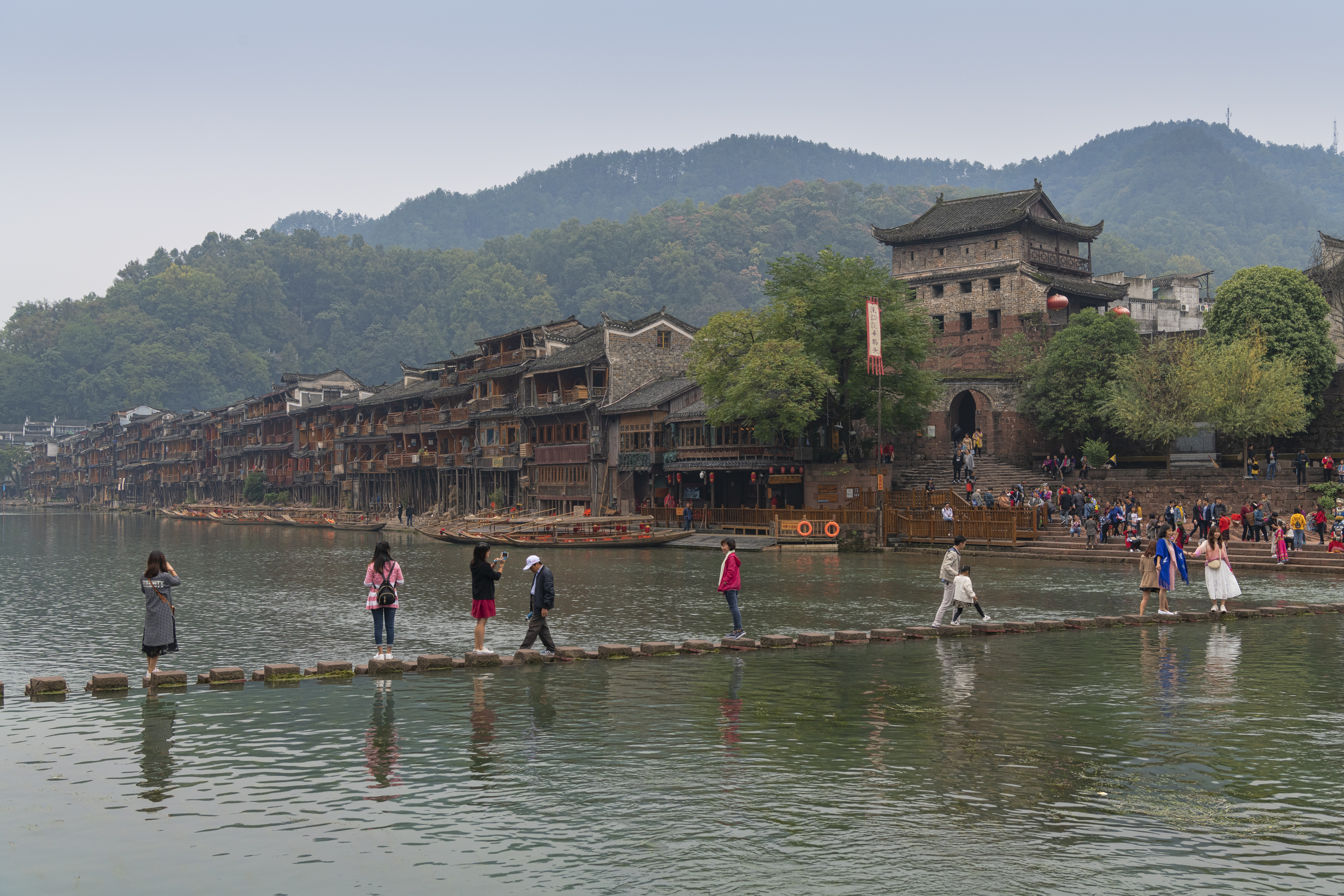
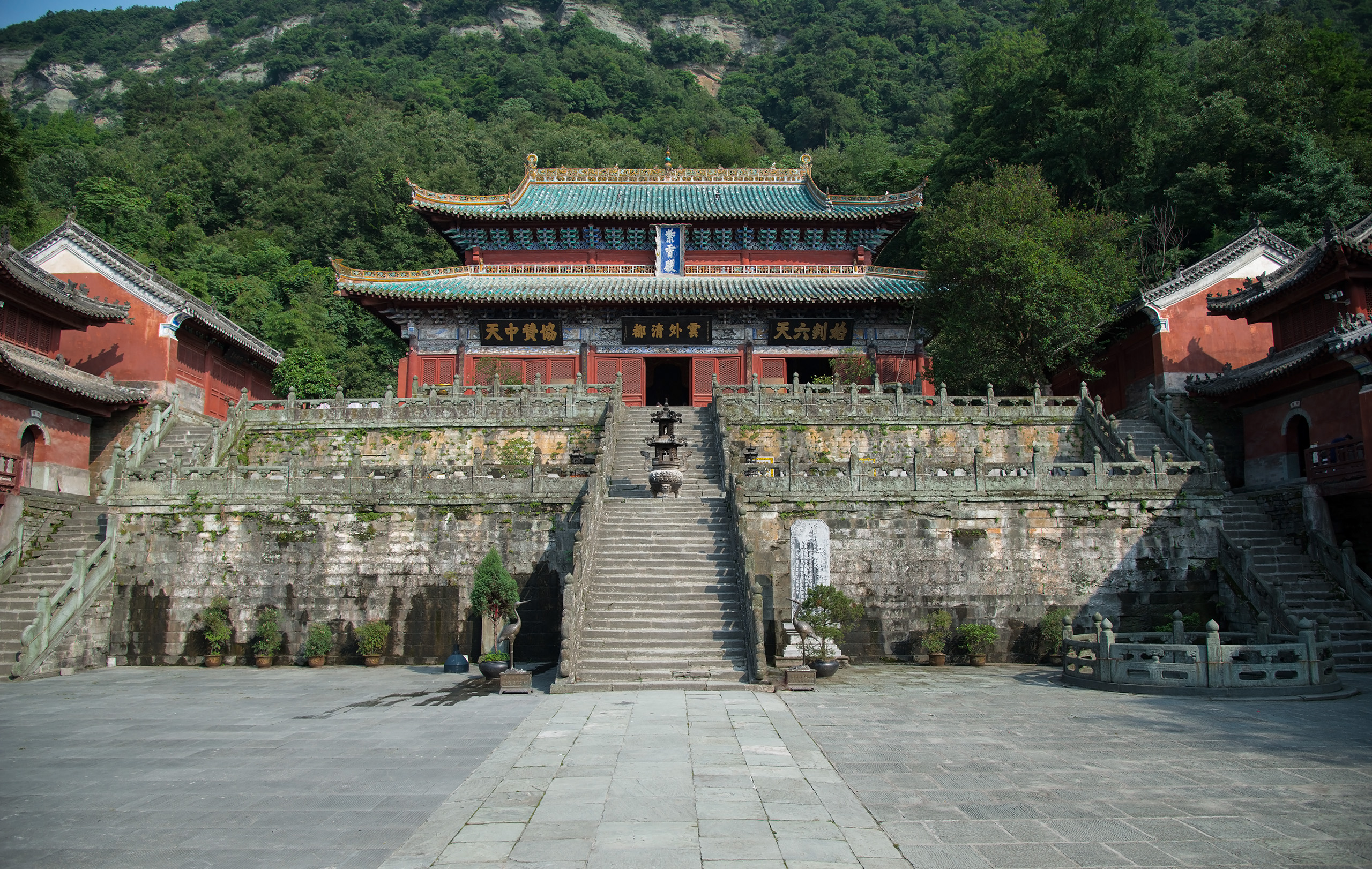
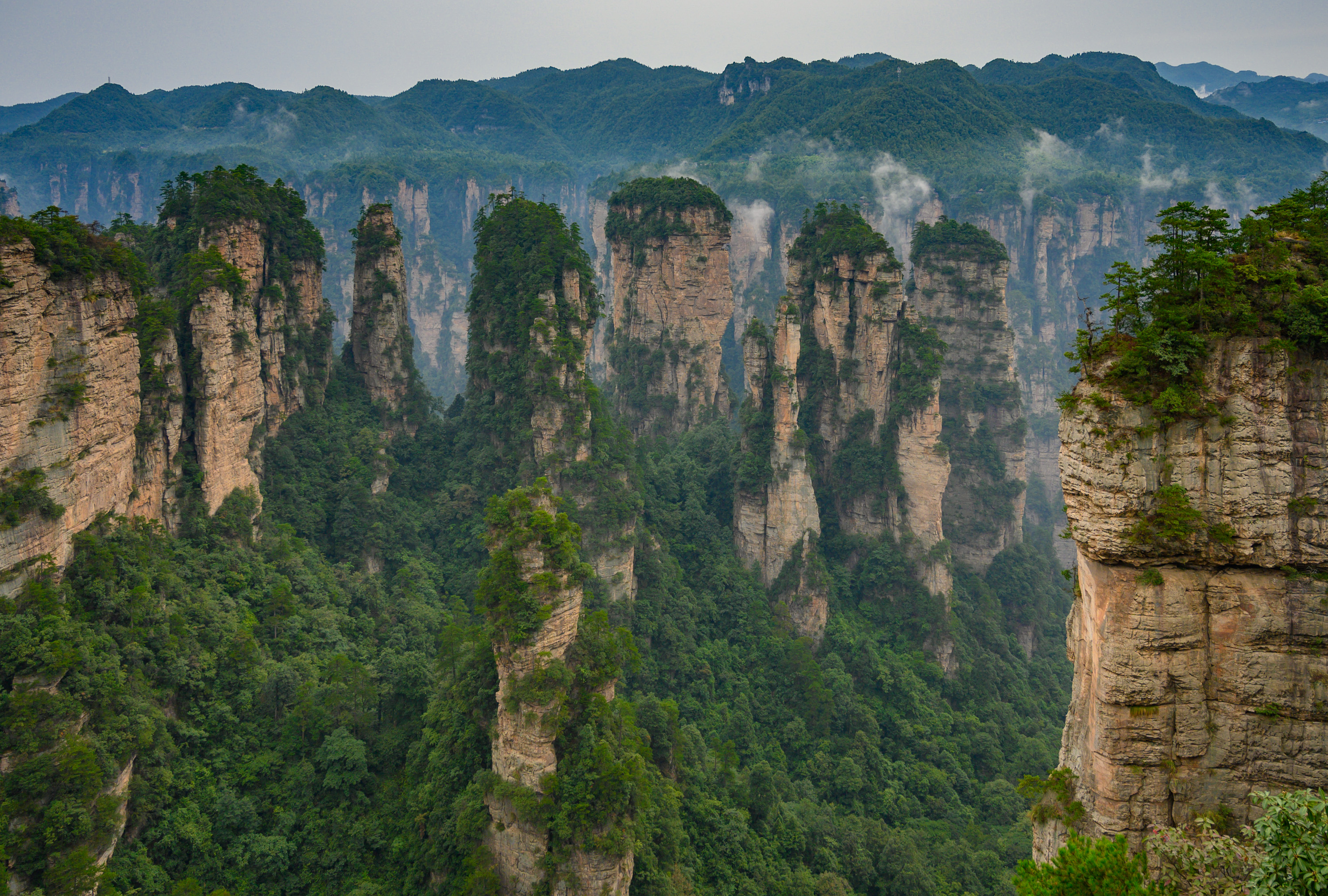
- Great Wall of China Summer Palace Leshan Giant Buddha Fenghuang Ancient Town Wudang Mountains Wulingyuan

- Location of China proper
- Country: China
- Largest city: Shanghai
- Subdivisions: Anhui, Beijing, Chongqing, Fujian, Gansu, Guangdong, Guangxi, Guizhou, Hainan, Hebei, Henan, Hubei, Hong Kong, Hunan, Jiangsu, Jiangxi, Macau, Shaanxi, Shandong, Shanghai, Shanxi, Sichuan, Tianjin, Yunnan, Zhejiang

Area
  - Total: 1,513,905 sq mi (3,920,996 km^{2})

Population (2020)
  - Total: 1,246,587,565
  - Density: 823.4252/sq mi (317.9263/km^{2})

China proper
- Traditional Chinese: 中國本土
- Simplified Chinese: 中国本土
- Hanyu Pinyin: zhōngguó běntǔ
- Literal meaning: China proper
Transcriptions
Standard Mandarin
- Hanyu Pinyin: zhōngguó běntǔ
- Wade–Giles: Chung^{1} Kuo^{2} Pen^{3} T'u^{3}

Alternative Chinese name
- Traditional Chinese: 中國本部
- Simplified Chinese: 中国本部
- Hanyu Pinyin: zhōngguó běnbù
- Literal meaning: China core
Transcriptions
Standard Mandarin
- Hanyu Pinyin: zhōngguó běnbù
- Wade–Giles: Chung^{1} Kuo^{2} Pen^{3} Pu^{4}

Second alternative Chinese name
- Chinese: 十八行省
- Hanyu Pinyin: shíbā xíngshěng
- Literal meaning: Eighteen Provinces
Transcriptions
Standard Mandarin
- Hanyu Pinyin: shíbā xíngshěng

Third alternative Chinese name
- Traditional Chinese: 關內十八省
- Simplified Chinese: 关内十八省
- Hanyu Pinyin: guānnèi shíbā shěng
- Literal meaning: Eighteen Provinces inside Shanhaiguan
Transcriptions
Standard Mandarin
- Hanyu Pinyin: guānnèi shíbā shěng

Fourth alternative Chinese name
- Traditional Chinese: 內地十八省
- Simplified Chinese: 内地十八省
- Hanyu Pinyin: nèidì shíbā shěng
- Literal meaning: Eighteen Provinces in mainland
Transcriptions
Standard Mandarin
- Hanyu Pinyin: nèidì shíbā shěng

Fifth alternative Chinese name
- Traditional Chinese: 中原漢地
- Simplified Chinese: 中原汉地
- Hanyu Pinyin: zhōngyuán hàndì
- Literal meaning: Han territory in Central Plain
Transcriptions
Standard Mandarin
- Hanyu Pinyin: zhōngyuán hàndì

China proper, also called Inner China, are terms used primarily in the Western world in reference to the traditional "core" regions of Chinese civilization centered around the Yellow River and Yangtze River valleys in East Asia. There is no fixed definition for China proper as many administrative, cultural and territorial shifts have occurred throughout history. One definition refers to the original heartland regions of the Chinese civilization, the Central Plain (southern North China Plain around the lower Yellow River valley) as well as the historical Nine Provinces; another to the Eighteen Provinces inside Shanhai Pass (Note: 关内十八省; 關內十八省, used in reference to the eighteen provinces within the bounds of the Ming Great Wall, i.e. Hebei, Henan, Shandong, Shanxi, Shaanxi, Gansu, Sichuan, Hubei, Hunan, Jiangsu, Zhejiang, Anhui, Jiangxi, Fujian, Guangdong, Guangxi, Guizhou, and Yunnan.) designated by the Qing regime. In contrast, Outer China is a term usually includes the peripheral marchland regions such as the Gobi Desert, (Note: Sometimes including the Mongolian Plateau as a whole.) Tarim Basin, Northeast China, Dzungaria, Tibetan Plateau, and Yungui Plateau, which were historically autonomous regions with unstable allegiance to the authority of Chinese monarchs.

The term was first used by the Europeans during the 17th century to distinguish the historical "Han lands" (Chinese: 漢地, i.e. regions long dominated by the majority Han Chinese population) from "frontier" regions of China where Han populations intermix with other indigenous ethnicities (e.g. Turkic peoples such as Uyghurs, Kazakhs, and Uzbeks, Mongolic peoples, and Tibeto-Burmese peoples such as Tibetans, Yi, and Bai) and newer foreign immigrants (e.g. Slavic colonists such as Russians and Ukrainian Cossacks), sometimes known as "Outer China". There was no direct translation for "China proper" in the Chinese language at the time due to differences in terminology used by the Qing regime to refer to the regions.

== Etymology ==
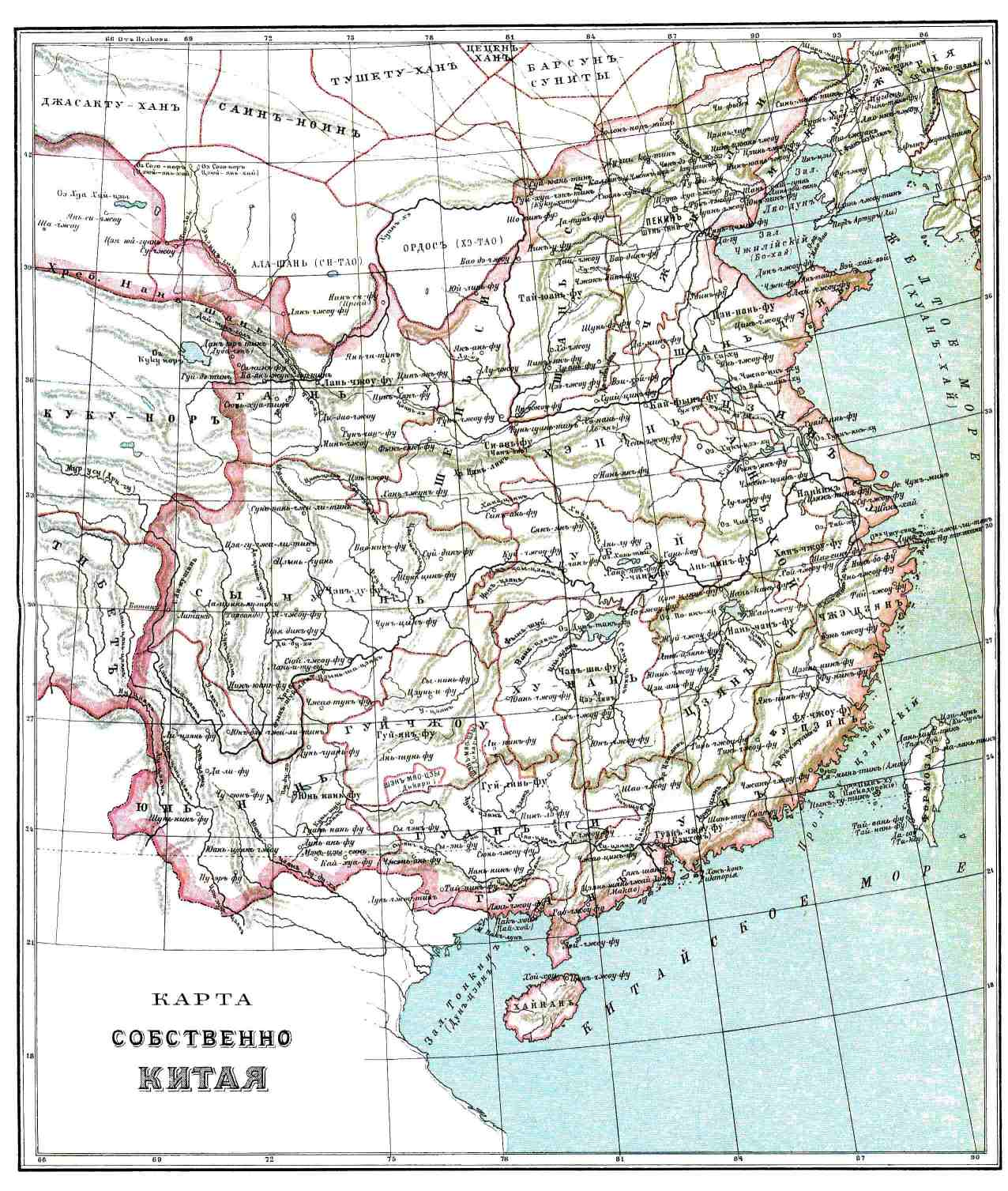
Map of China proper in 1900 from the Brockhaus and Efron Encyclopedic Dictionary.

According to Harry Harding, the concept can date back to 1827. But as early as in 1795, William Winterbotham adopted this concept in his book. When describing the Chinese Empire under the Qing dynasty, Winterbotham divided it into three parts: China proper, Chinese Tartary, and the states tributary to China. He adopted the opinions of Du Halde and Grosier and suspected that the name of "China" came from Qin dynasty. He then said: "China, properly so called,... comprehends from north to south eighteen degrees; its extent from east to west being somewhat less..."

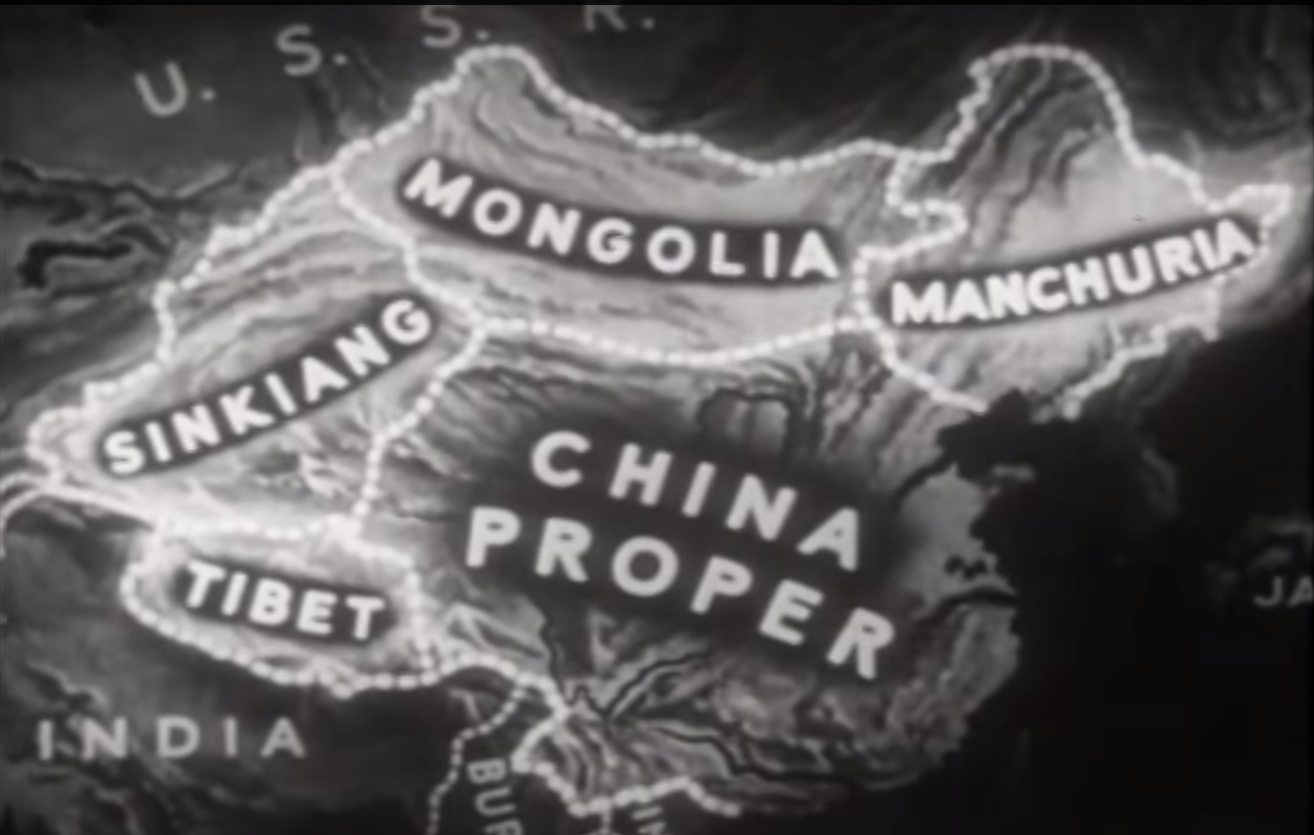
A 1944 map of China Proper (including some of Inner Mongolia), Mongolia (Outer Mongolia), Manchuria, Xinjiang (Sinkiang), and Tibet from the War Information Office propaganda film Why We Fight: The Battle of China. The outer borders include several areas claimed by the Republic of China.

The concept of "China proper" also appeared before this 1795 book. It can be found in The Gentleman's Magazine, published in 1790, and The Monthly Review, published in 1749. In the nineteenth century, the term "China proper" was sometimes used by Chinese officials when they were communicating in foreign languages. For instance, the Qing ambassador to Britain Zeng Jize used it in an English language article, which he published in 1887.

"Dulimbai Gurun" is the Manchu name for China (中國, Zhongguo; "Middle Kingdom"). After conquering the Ming, the Qing identified their state as "China" (Zhongguo), and referred to it as "Dulimbai Gurun" in the Manchu language. The Qing emperors equated the lands of the Qing state (including both "China proper" and present day Manchuria, Xinjiang, Mongolia, Tibet and other areas) as "China" in both the Chinese and Manchu languages, defining China as a multiethnic state, rejecting the idea that China only meant Han-populated areas in "China proper", proclaiming that both Han and non-Han peoples were part of "China", using "China" to refer to the Qing in official documents, international treaties, and foreign affairs, and the "Chinese language" (Dulimbai gurun i bithe) referred to Chinese, Manchu, and Mongol languages, and the term "Chinese people" (中國人, Zhongguo ren; Manchu: Dulimbai gurun i niyalma) referred to all Han, Manchu, and Mongol subjects of the Qing.

When the Qing conquered Dzungaria in 1759, they proclaimed that the new land was absorbed into "China" (Dulimbai Gurun) in a Manchu language memorial. The Qing expounded on their ideology that they were bringing together the "outer" non-Han peoples like the Manchus, Mongols, Uighurs and Tibetans together with the "inner" Han people, into "one family" united under the Qing state, showing that the diverse subjects of the Qing were all part of one family, the Qing used the phrase "Zhong Wai Yi Jia" (中外一家) or "Nei Wai Yi Jia" (內外一家, "interior and exterior as one family"), to convey this idea of "unification" of the different peoples. A Manchu language version of a treaty with the Russian Empire concerning criminal jurisdiction over bandits called people from the Qing as "people of the Central Kingdom (Dulimbai Gurun)".

In the Manchu official Tulisen's Manchu language account of his meeting with the Torghut Mongol leader Ayuki Khan, it was mentioned that while the Torghuts were unlike the Russians, the "people of the Central Kingdom" (dulimba-i gurun; 中國, Zhongguo) were like the Torghut Mongols, and the "people of the Central Kingdom" referred to the Manchus.

While the Qing dynasty used "China" (Zhongguo) to describe non-Han areas, some Han scholar-officials opposed the Qing emperor's use of Zhongguo to refer to non-Han areas, using instead Zhongguo to mark a distinction between the culturally Han areas and the territories newly acquired by the Qing empire. In the early 19th century, Wei Yuan's Shengwuji (Military History of the Qing Dynasty) calls the Inner Asian polities guo, while the seventeen provinces of the traditional heartland, that is, "China proper", and three eastern provinces of Manchuria are called "Zhongguo". Some Ming loyalists of Han ethnicity refused to use Zhongguo to refer to areas outside the borders of Ming China, in effect refusing to acknowledge the legitimacy of the Qing dynasty. Han Chinese intellectuals gradually embraced the new meaning of "China" and began to recognize it as their homeland.

== Political use ==
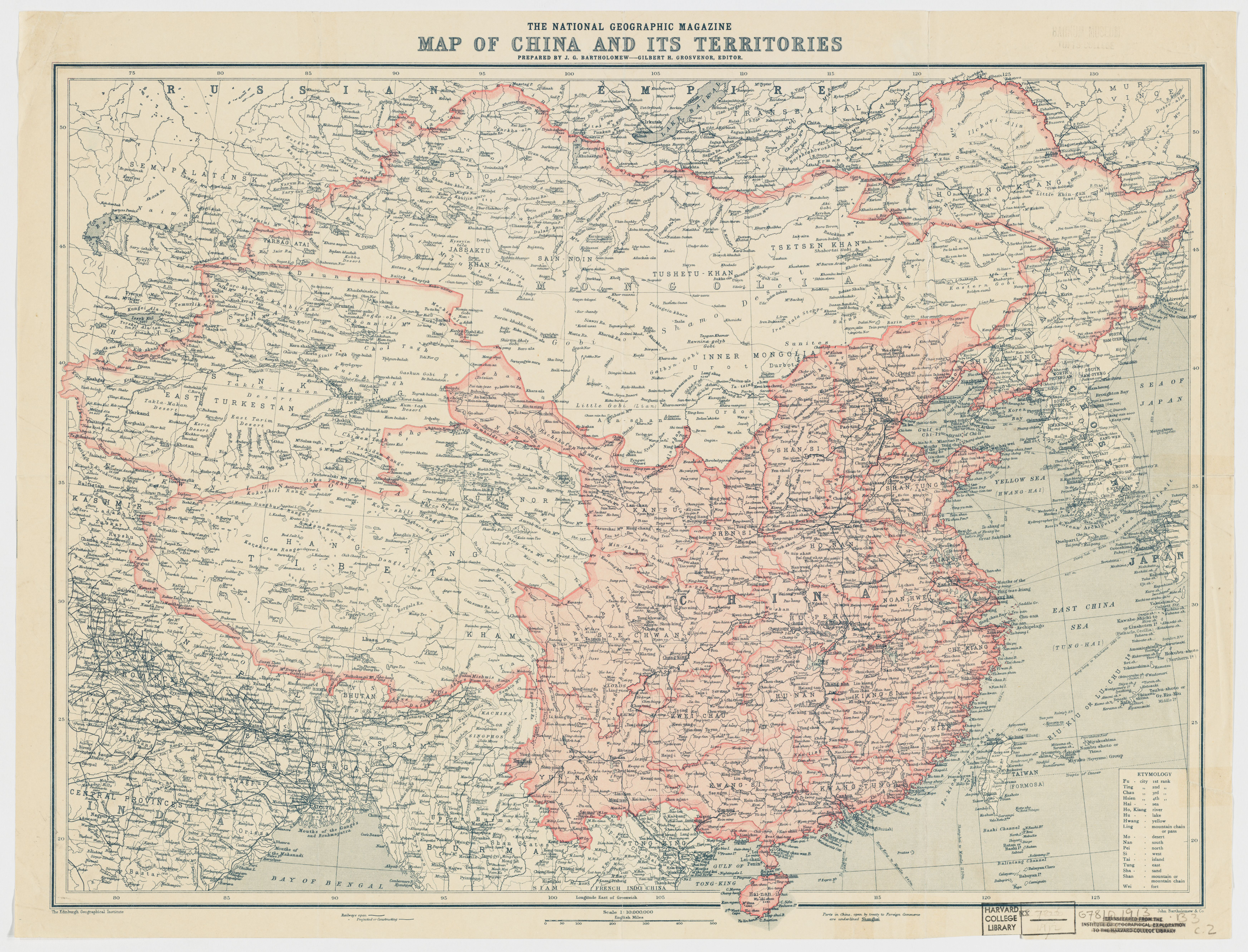
A 1912 map from an issue of National Geographic magazine showing the Republic of China. China proper is shaded in pink, while other Chinese territories have pink borders.

In the early 20th century, a series of Sino-Japanese conflicts had raised Chinese people's concern for national unity, and the concept of a unified, undivided Chinese nation became more popular among Chinese scholars. On 1 January 1939, Gu Jiegang published his article "The term 'China proper' should be abolished immediately", which argued that the widely accepted area covered by "China proper" is not the actual territory of any of the Chinese dynasties. Gu further theorized that "中国本部", the Chinese and Japanese term equal to "China proper" at the time, actually originated from Japan and was translated into "China proper", hence the concept of "China proper" was developed by Japanese people, and it had become a tool to divide Chinese people, making way for the Japanese invasion of Mongolia, Manchuria, and other parts of China. Gu's article sparked a heated debate on the definition and origin of "Zhonghua minzu" (Chinese nation), which contributed to unifying the Chinese people in the Second Sino-Japanese War, and to an extent shaped the later established concept of Zhonghua minzu.

== Modern ==
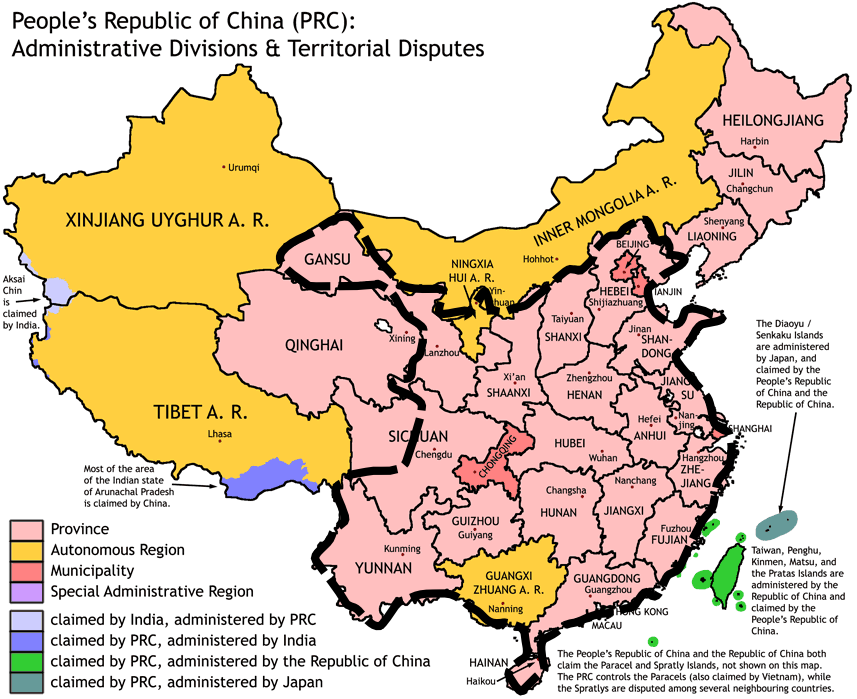
Framed by a dashed line, the provinces of "China proper". This definition excludes Inner Mongolia, Northeast China (Inner Manchuria), Taiwan, Tibet, and Xinjiang.

Today, China proper is a controversial concept in China itself, since the current official paradigm does not contrast the core and the periphery of China. There is no single widely used term corresponding to it in the Chinese language. According to Sinologist Colin Mackerras, foreign governments have generally accepted Chinese claims over its ethnic minority areas, because to redefine a country's territory every time it underwent a change of regime would cause endless instability and warfare. Also, he asks, "if the boundaries of the Qing were considered illegitimate, why should it go back to the much smaller Ming in preference to the quite extensive Tang dynasty boundaries?"

== Extent ==
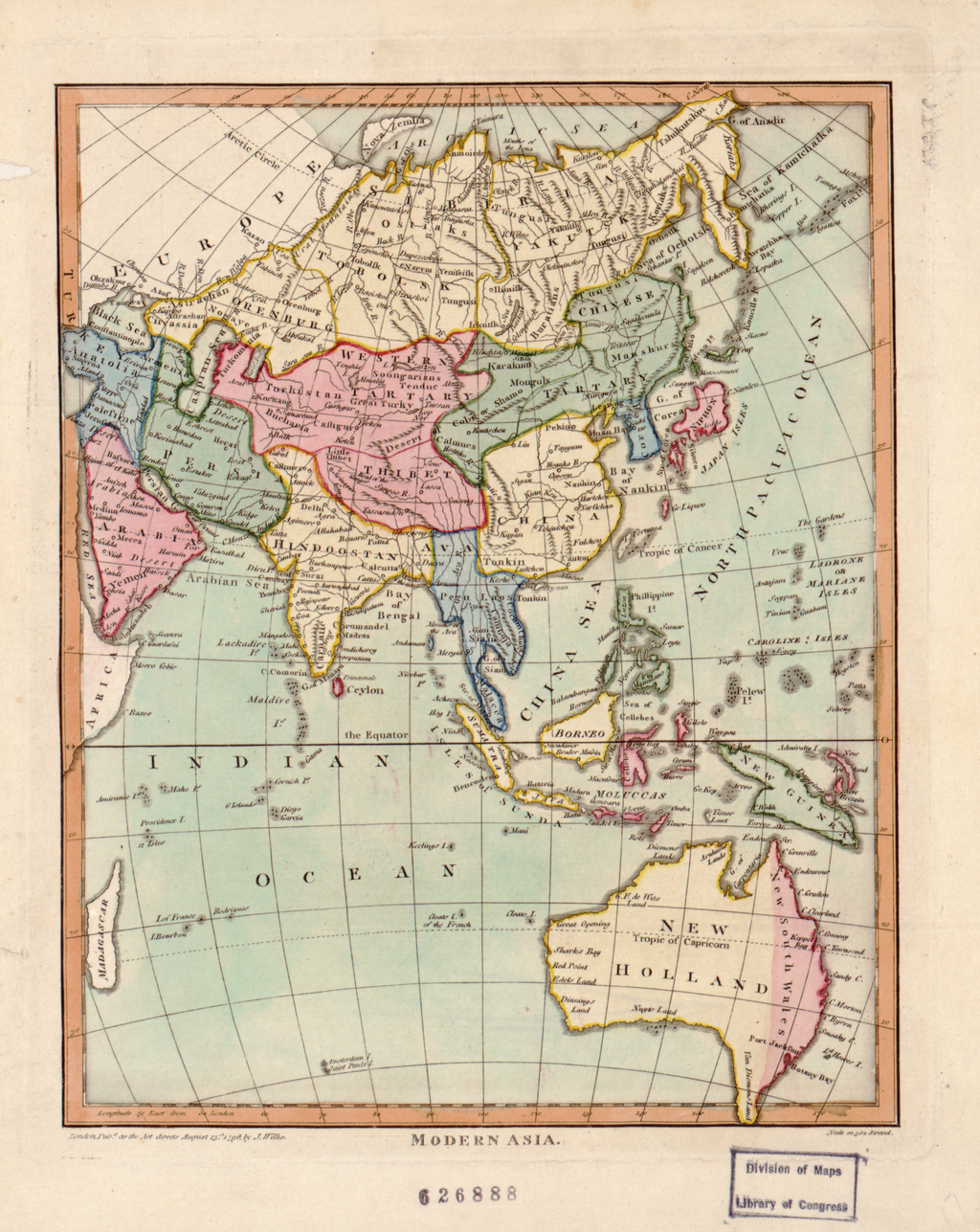
Map of Asia from 1796, with China proper coloured in yellow as "China"

There is no fixed geographical extent for China proper, as it is used to express the contrast between the core and frontier regions of China from multiple perspectives: historical, administrative, cultural, and linguistic. The Great Wall of China is often used as an approximate boundary between Han Chinese-dominated core regions and other frontier regions, which roughly corresponds to the so-called "400 mm (16 in) annual precipitation line" that delineates arid/semi-arid regions largely unsuitable for agricultural activities from those with more rainfall and thus more adaptable to agrarian societies (such as those of the Han Chinese).

=== Historical perspective ===
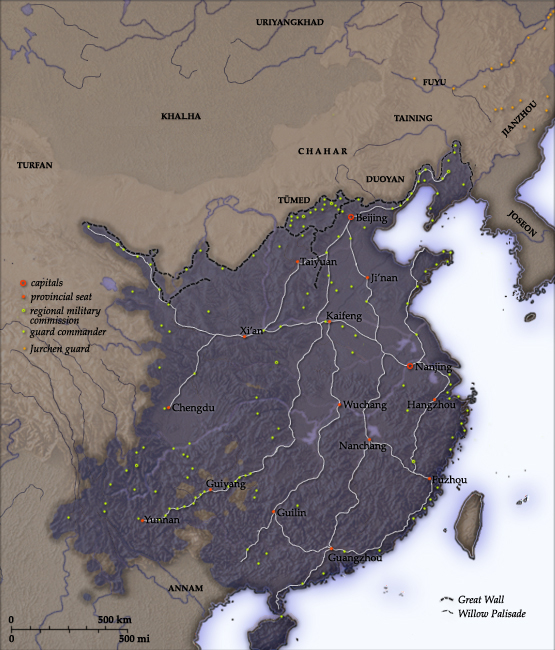
The approximate extent of China proper during the late Ming dynasty, the last dynasty of China ruled by the Han people. Liaodong Peninsula was still administered as part of China proper before it was conquered by the Manchus.

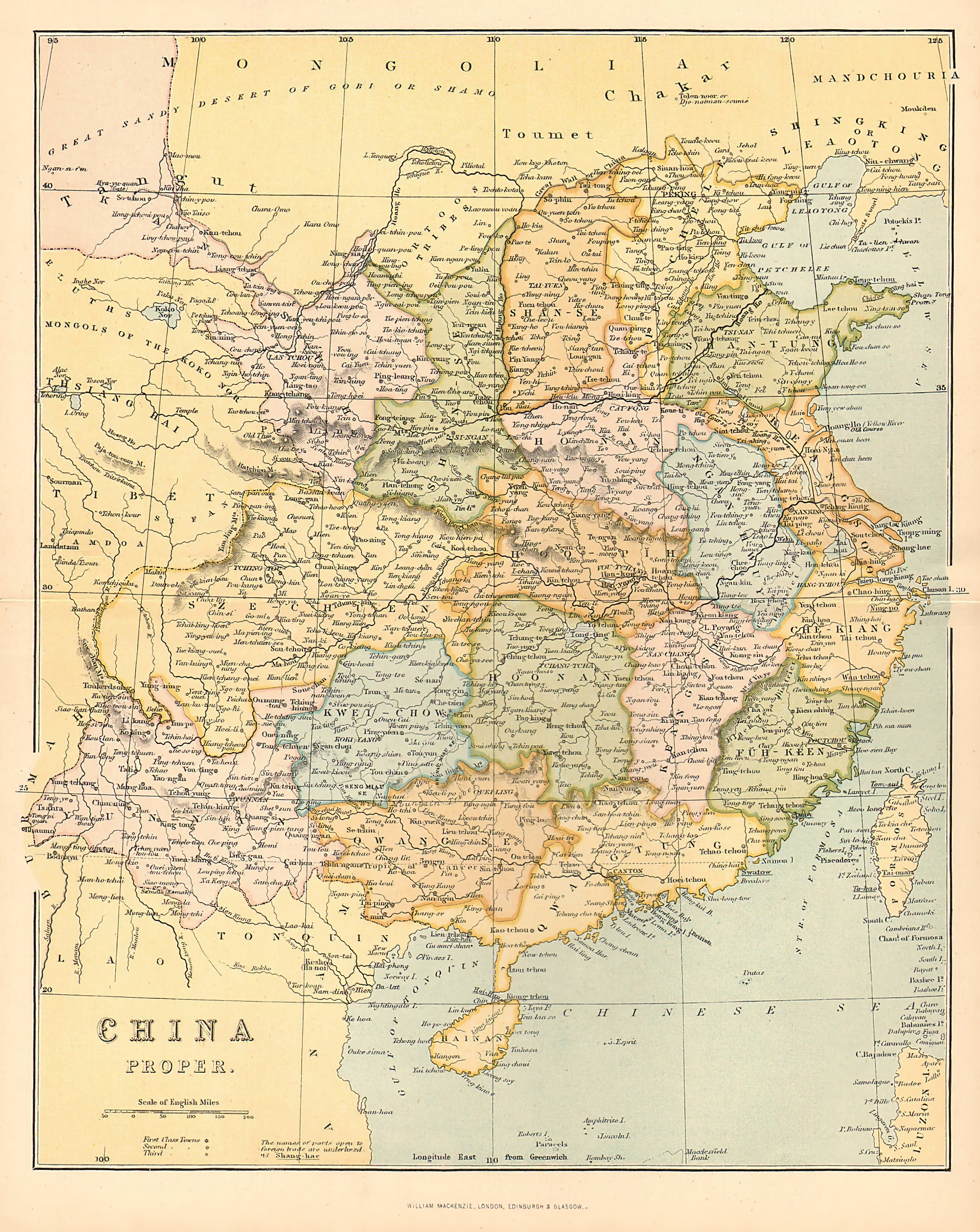
The Eighteen Provinces of China proper in 1875, before Taiwan's separation from Fujian in 1885 and its annexation by Japan in 1895

One way of thinking about China proper is to refer to the long-standing territories held by dynasties of China founded by the Han people. Chinese civilization developed from a core region in the North China Plain, and expanded outwards over several millennia, conquering and assimilating surrounding peoples, or being conquered and influenced in turn. Some dynasties, such as the Han and Tang dynasties, were particularly expansionist, extending far into Inner Asia, while others, such as the Jin and Song dynasties, were forced to relinquish the North China Plain itself to rivaling regimes founded by peoples from the north.

The Ming dynasty was the last strictly Chinese dynasty of ethnic Han origin and the second-last imperial dynasty of China. It governed fifteen administrative entities, which included thirteen provinces (Chinese: 布政使司; pinyin: Bùzhèngshǐ Sī) and two "directly-governed" areas. After the Manchu-led Qing dynasty succeeded the Ming dynasty in China proper, the Qing court decided to continue to use the Ming administrative system to rule over former Ming lands, without applying it to other domains under Qing rule, namely Manchuria, Mongolia, Xinjiang, Taiwan and Tibet. The 15 administrative units of the Ming dynasty underwent minor reforms to become the "Eighteen Provinces" (一十八行省; Yīshíbā Xíngshěng, or 十八省; Shíbā Shěng) of China proper under the Qing dynasty. It was these eighteen provinces that early Western sources referred to as China proper.

There are some minor differences between the extent of Ming China and the extent of the eighteen provinces of Qing China: for example, some parts of Manchuria were Ming possessions belonging to the province of Liaodong (now Liaoning), which is inside the Ming Great Wall; however, the Qing conquered it before entering the Central Plain and did not administer as part of a regular province of China proper. On the other hand, Taiwan was a new acquisition of the Qing dynasty, and it was placed under the administration of Fujian, one of the provinces of China proper. Eastern Kham in Greater Tibet was added to Sichuan, while much of what now constitutes northern Burma was added to Yunnan.

Near the end of the Qing dynasty, there was an effort to extend the province system of China proper to the rest of the empire. Taiwan was converted into a separate province in 1885, but was ceded to Japan in 1895. Xinjiang was reorganized into a province in 1884. Manchuria was split into the three provinces of Fengtian, Jilin and Heilongjiang in 1907. There was discussion to do the same in Tibet, Qinghai (Kokonor), Inner Mongolia, and Outer Mongolia, but these proposals were not put to practice, and these areas were outside the provincial system of China proper when the Qing dynasty fell in 1912.

The Provinces of the Qing Dynasty were:

Eighteen provinces
| Postal | Pinyin | Chinese | Postal | Pinyin | Chinese | Postal | Pinyin | Chinese |
|---|---|---|---|---|---|---|---|---|
| Anhwei | Ānhuī | 安徽省 | Hunan | Húnán | 湖南省 | Kweichow | Guìzhōu | 貴州省 |
| Chekiang | Zhèjiāng | 浙江省 | Kansu | Gānsù | 甘肅省 | Shansi | Shānxī | 山西省 |
| Chihli | Zhílì | 直隸省 | Kiangsu | Jiāngsū | 江蘇省 | Shantung | Shāndōng | 山東省 |
| Fukien | Fújiàn | 福建省 | Kiangsi | Jiāngxī | 江西省 | Shensi | Shǎnxī | 陝西省 |
| Honan | Hénán | 河南省 | Kwangtung | Guǎngdōng | 廣東省 | Szechwan | Sìchuān | 四川省 |
| Hupeh | Húběi | 湖北省 | Kwangsi | Guǎngxī | 廣西省 | Yunnan | Yúnnán | 雲南省 |
Additional provinces in late Qing dynasty
| Fengtien | Fèngtiān | 奉天省 | Heilungkiang | Hēilóngjiāng | 黑龍江省 | Kirin | Jílín | 吉林省 |
| Sinkiang | Xīnjiāng | 新疆省 | | | | | | |

Some of the revolutionaries who sought to overthrow Qing rule desired to establish a state independent of the Qing dynasty within the bounds of the Eighteen Provinces, as evinced by their Eighteen-Star Flag. Others favoured the replacement of the entire Qing dynasty by a new republic, as evinced by their Five-Striped Flag. Some revolutionaries, such as Zou Rong, used the term Zhongguo Benbu (中国本部) which roughly identifies the Eighteen Provinces. When the Qing dynasty fell, the abdication decree of the Xuantong Emperor bequeathed all the territories of the Qing dynasty to the new Republic of China, and the latter idea was therefore adopted by the new republic as the principle of Five Races Under One Union, with Five Races referring to the Han, Manchus, Mongols, Muslims (Uyghurs, Hui etc.) and Tibetans. The Five-Striped Flag was adopted as the national flag, and the Republic of China viewed itself as a single unified state encompassing all five regions handed down by the Qing dynasty. The People's Republic of China, which was founded in 1949 and replaced the Republic of China on mainland China, has continued to claim essentially the same borders, with the only major exception being the recognition of an independent Mongolia. As a result, the concept of China proper fell out of favour in China.

The Eighteen Provinces of the Qing dynasty still largely exist, but their boundaries have changed. Beijing and Tianjin were eventually split from Hebei (renamed from Zhili), Shanghai from Jiangsu, Chongqing from Sichuan, Ningxia autonomous region from Gansu, and Hainan from Guangdong. Guangxi is now an autonomous region. The provinces that the late Qing dynasty set up have also been kept: Xinjiang became an autonomous region under the People's Republic of China, while the three provinces of Manchuria now have somewhat different borders, with Fengtian renamed as Liaoning.

When the Qing dynasty fell, Republican Chinese control of Qing territories, including of those generally considered to be in "China proper", was tenuous, and non-existent in Tibet and Mongolian People's Republic (former Outer Mongolia) since 1922, which were controlled by governments that declared independence from China. The Republic of China subdivided Inner Mongolia in its time on the mainland, although the People's Republic of China later joined Mongol-inhabited territories into a single autonomous region. The PRC joined the Qamdo area into the Tibet area (later the Tibet Autonomous Region). The Republic of China officially recognized the independence of Mongolia in 1946, which was also acknowledged by the PRC government since its founding in 1949.

=== Ethnic perspective ===
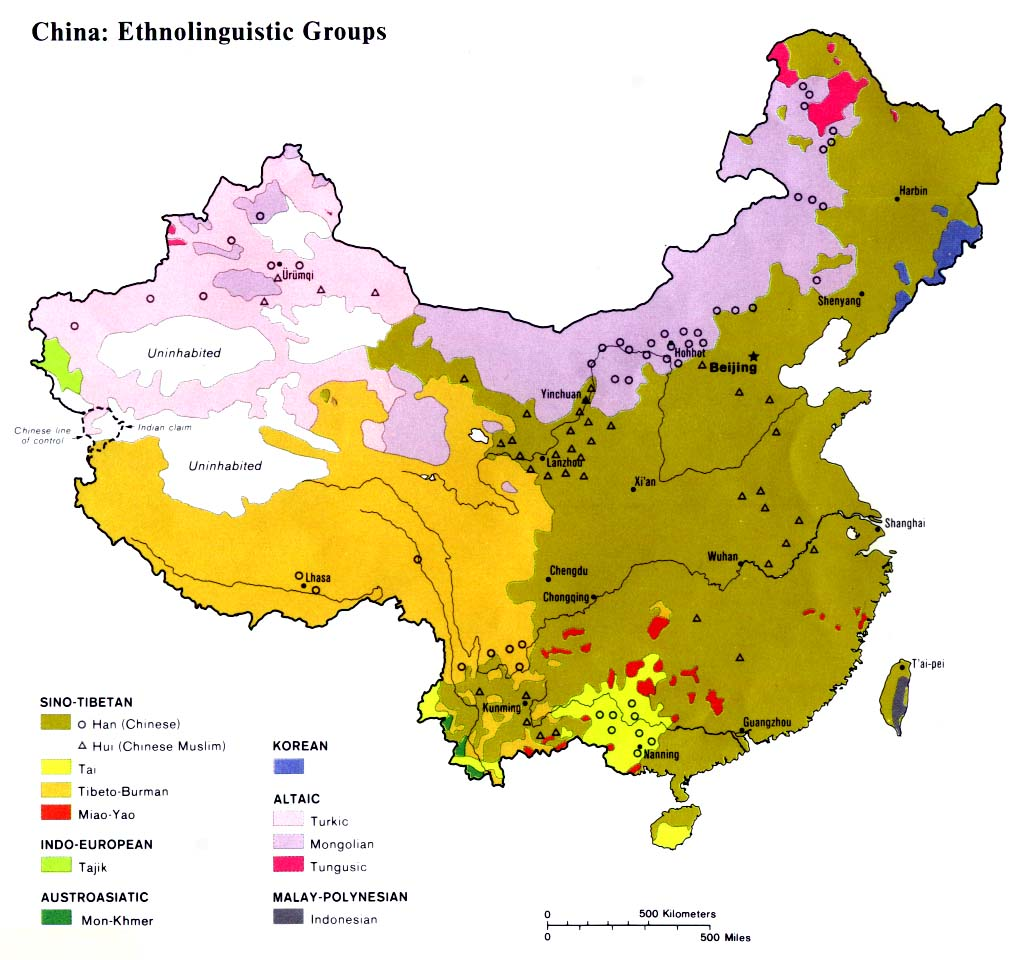
The approximate extent of the Han ethnicity in China and Taiwan as of 1983, denoted in brown. (Note: Source: United States Central Intelligence Agency, 1983. The map shows the distribution of ethnolinguistic groups according to the majority ethnic group by region in 1983. This map does not represent the current distribution of ethnic groups due to internal migration and assimilation.) Scattered distribution is denoted by circles.

Much of the regions outside of China proper are autonomous regions.

China proper is often associated with the Han people, the majority ethnic group of China and with the extent of the Chinese languages, an important unifying element of the Han ethnicity.

However, Han regions in the present day do not correspond well to the Eighteen Provinces of the Qing dynasty. Much of southwestern China, such as areas in the provinces of Yunnan, Guangxi, and Guizhou, was part of successive dynasties of ethnic Han origin, including the Ming dynasty and the Eighteen Provinces of the Qing dynasty. However, these areas were and continue to be populated by various non-Han minority groups, such as the Zhuang, the Miao people, and the Bouyei. Conversely, Han people form the majority in most of Manchuria, much of Inner Mongolia, many areas in Xinjiang and scattered parts of Tibet today, not least due to the expansion of Han settlement encouraged by the late Qing dynasty, the Republic of China, and the People's Republic of China.

Ethnic Han is not synonymous with speakers of the Chinese language. Many non-Han ethnicities, such as the Hui and Manchu, are essentially monolingual in the Chinese language, but do not identify as ethnic Han. The Chinese language itself is also a complex entity, and should be described as a family of related languages rather than a single language if the criterion of mutual intelligibility is used to classify its subdivisions.

In polls the majority of the people of Taiwan call themselves "Taiwanese" only with the rest identifying as "Taiwanese and Chinese" or "Chinese" only. Most of the people of Taiwan are descendants of immigrants from mainland China since the 1600s, but the inclusion of Taiwan in the definition of China proper, is still a controversial subject. See History of Taiwan and Political status of Taiwan for more information.

== See also ==
- Names of China
- Annam
- Chinese world
  - Greater China
- Heihe–Tengchong Line
- Mainland China
- Metropole
- North China Plain
- Chinese Empire
- Inner Asia
  - Ming dynasty in Inner Asia
  - Qing dynasty in Inner Asia
- Outer Mongolia
- Outer Manchuria
- Sinocentrism
- Zhonghua Minzu
- Chinese macro-regions—Socio-economic divisions of China proper
  - Zhongyuan
- Willow Palisade
- Great Wall of China
- Serbia proper
- Russia proper
- Mainland India
