= Kyakhta trade =

Historic trade route between Siberia and China

Chinese Trader in Kyakhta (Russian painting, 17th century).

The Kyakhta Trade (Russian: Кяхтинская торговля, Kyahtinskaya torgovlya, Chinese: 恰克图商路) refers to the trade between Russia and China through the town of Kyakhta on the Mongolian border south of Lake Baikal from 1727. The trade was mostly Siberian furs for Chinese cotton, silk, tobacco and tea.

== The earlier Nerchinsk trade 1689–1722 ==
Russia and China came into direct contact after Russians made themselves masters of the Siberian forests between 1582 and 1639. In 1689 the Treaty of Nerchinsk delineated the Russo-Chinese border in "Manchuria". This treaty said nothing about Mongolia since this area had not yet come under Chinese/Manchu control. The fifth article of the treaty allowed trade with proper documents but was otherwise vague. Russian merchants began organizing caravans to travel from Nerchinsk (east of Chita) to Beijing (Russian: Пекин, romanized: Pekin), the round trip usually taking 10 to 12 months. In 1692–93 Eberhard Isbrand Ides went on a commercial-diplomatic mission to Beijing. He left Beijing in February 1694 and reached Moscow 11 months later. Tsar Peter I of Russia now decided that trade should be a state monopoly. Fourteen Russian state caravans travelled to Beijing in the period between 1689 and 1722. Private trade continued, much of it going short distances to places like Urga (present-day Ulaanbaatar) and Qiqihar. In 1721 Lorenz Lange estimated that the Urga trade alone was four times greater than that of the state caravans. The first state caravan left Moscow in 1697 and returned two years later. The fourth, under Ivan Savateev, left Moscow in 1702, used the usual Nerchinsk route but returned via Urga and Selenginsk, which took only 70 days. It carried a letter from the Lifanyuan (the Chinese regional authority) suggesting that this become the standard route since Mongolia was now under Manchu control and local relations could be managed by the Tushetu Khan at Urga. There was a fifth caravan under Petr Khudiakov in 1705–09. The First Oirat-Manchu War of 1687 to 1697 had forced the Dzungar Khanate out of Mongolia and made border control more important. The journey of Tulishen in 1712-15 gave the Manchus more knowledge of the western regions. From 1717 the Manchus began to pressure the Russians to delineate the Mongol border. In 1717–20 Lev Vasil'yevich Izmailov went to Beijing to negotiate a trade treaty, but this attempt failed because of the border problem. A caravan under one "Ifin" was stopped at the Great Wall and another under Fedor Istopnikov was detained in 1718. In 1722 the Manchus blocked trade pending settlement of the border problem. This led to the Treaty of Kyakhta of 1727.

== The foundation of Kyakhta ==
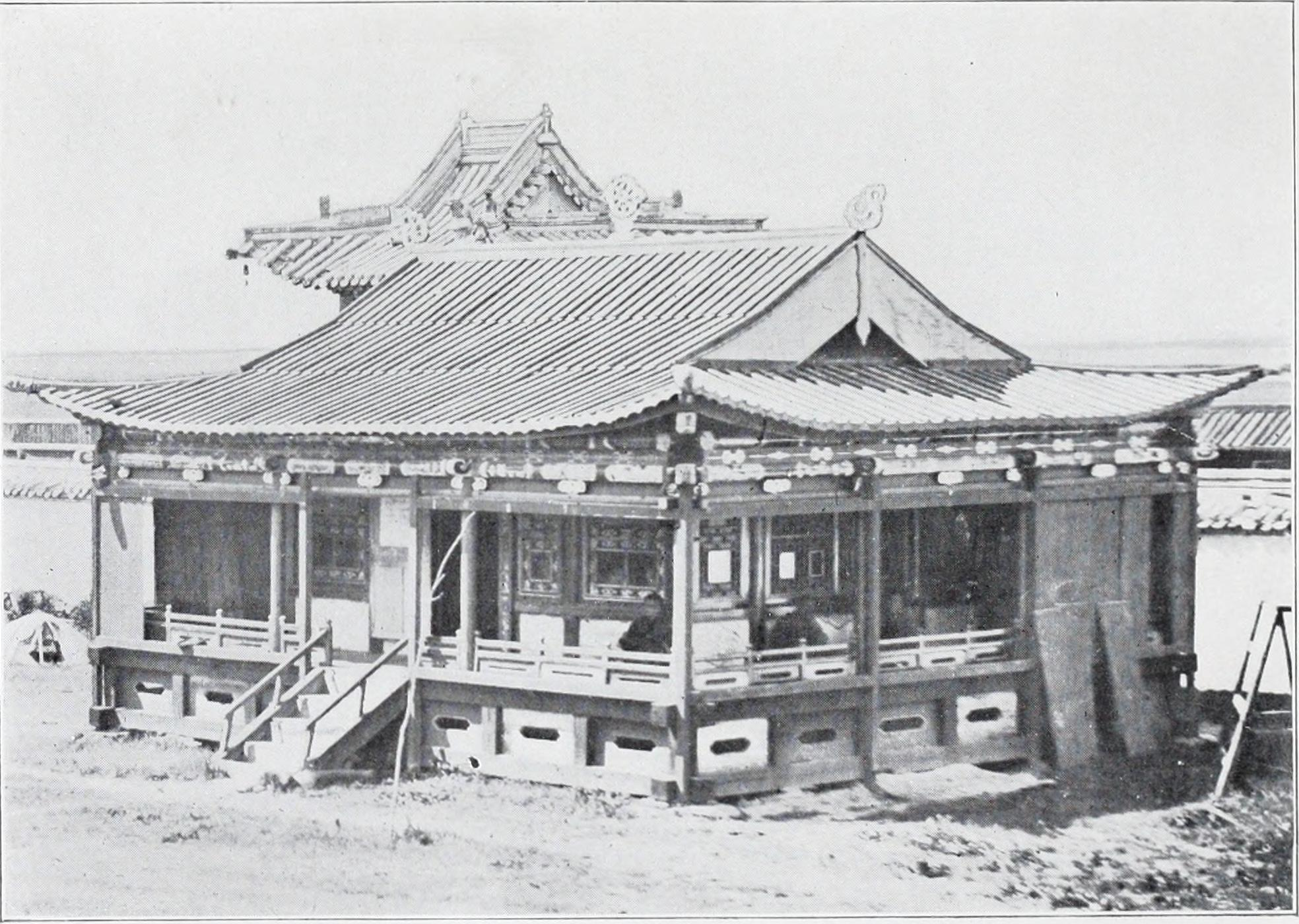
The temple of Maimaicheng in 1910

The Treaty of Kyakhta (1727) specified that all official trade between the two empires would pass through points near Kyakhta and Tsurukaitu on the Manchurian border. Tsurukaitu never became important because the Kyakhta route was much better than the long journey east from Lake Baikal. Before the treaty the Russians in the area were centered at Selenginsk and the Manchus worked through the Tushetu Khan at Urga. Kyakhta was the approximate point where the treaty was negotiated and the point where the border delimitation began. The Russians quickly built the post of Kyakhta at the border and the Manchus built the fort of Maimaicheng a few hundred feet south on their side. Officials on both sides dealt with diplomatic exchanges between the two empires, trade disputes and the usual police matters to be expected on a long border inhabited by nomads who cared little about rules imposed by distant empires. The chief Manchu official was called the Dzarguchei and Maimaicheng was managed by the Lifanyuan which dealt with the western grasslands. The Russians were mainly interested in trade and the Chinese mainly wanted to control the border and prevent Russian interference with their westward expansion toward the Dzungar Khanate. The Manchus would sometimes prevent trade to put pressure on the Russians. The longest interruption was 1785–92 over a Buryat robber that the Russians had failed to execute.

== Route ==
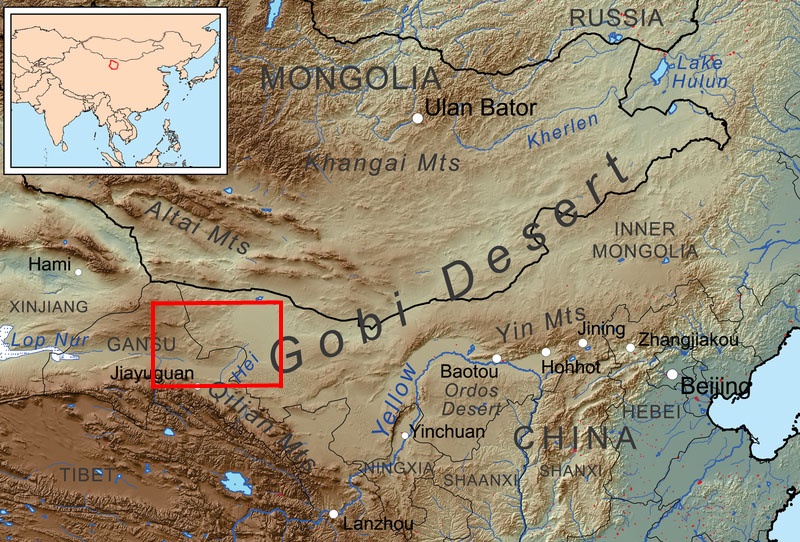
Urga (Ulaanbaatar), Gobi Desert, Kalgan (Zhangjiakou) and Beijing. Kyakhta is directly north of Urga

The trade route followed the usual route to Irkutsk, by flatboat across Lake Baikal, and south by poling up the Selenge River past Selinginsk. Near the mouth of the Chikoy River at a place called Strelka or Petropavlovsk goods were loaded onto carts and carried south to Kyakhta where caravans were assembled or goods bartered. Much barter was done at Kyakhta during the winter and Chinese goods were shipped west when the rivers melted. From the 1760s the overland route from Yekaterinburg began to replace the Siberian rivers. When the ground was frozen solid this might take 70 or 80 days. Later in the century furs from Russian-America were sent via Okhotsk and Yakutsk to Kyakhta.

To the south the route went south to Urga, southeast to Kalgan on the Great Wall and then Beijing. The crossing of the Gobi took at least 30 to 40 days. The second state caravan followed the Kerulen River east, but this was not repeated. A round trip on the route might take from one to three years.

== The state caravans ==
The treaty said that caravans would be three years apart. There were six state caravans from Kyakhta between 1727 and 1760. At Beijing the caravan leaders dealt with diplomacy, the Russian church in Beijing and the few Russian students who were there to learn Manchu and Chinese. The leader often had an audience with the Emperor.

1. 1727: Molokov, Lorenz Lange as diplomat: Outbound Sep-Dec 1727, stayed in Beijing 6 months, returned Jul-Sep 1728. They set out with 205 men, 1,650 horses, 475 goods carts, 162 provision carts and 665 cattle for food. They had 285,404 rubles in goods including 2,100,000 pelts. Between Selenginsk and Kalgan they lost 489 horses and 258 cattle. At Kalgan they left their extra horses to be picked up on the way back. In Beijing they stayed at the Russian House or Lifan Yuan. Numerous 'guards' soon appeared. Trade went slowly and the Russians blamed the Chinese officials. Before leaving Lange had an audience with the Emperor. They returned with 125,000 yards of silk, 570,000 yards of cotton, 30,000 pounds of tea (much less than later), 65,000 rubles in gold and silver and 404,000 unsold pelts. In 1731-33 excess goods were bartered at the border for about 125,000 rubles at Moscow prices. 335,301 rubles of Chinese goods were brought to Moscow for sale, some remaining unsold until 1735. Cost of caravan estimated at 62,687 rubles.
2. 1731: Molokov+Lange: Nov '31-Mar '32, returned Sep '32-Sep '33. 113 men, about 100,000 rubles in goods and 140,000 in coin. They returned with 214,699 rubles of Chinese goods at Moscow prices. Lange had another audience with the Emperor. Outbound, to avoid the Gobi desert, they followed the Kerulen River where they were robbed. They returned north to Tsurukaitu and were again robbed. The bandits were captured and the Manchus sent the heads of nine bandits to Kyakhta as a token of good will. The journey from Beijing to Tsurukaitu lasted from Sep '32 to Apr '33. At Tsurukaitu they had difficulty finding storage space and laborers. It took them all summer to travel west to Irkutsk. This route was not used again.
3. 1736: Firsov+Lange: Jul? 36-Nov ’36, return May-Aug '37. 100,000 rubles in goods. Goods sold in St Petersburg rather than Moscow.
4. 1741: Firsov: Jun-Sep '41 Apr 42-?. About 100,000 rubles. Sold at St Petersburg
5. 1745: Lebratovsky: Aug 45-Dec '45 Jun? 46-?
6. 1753?: Vladykin ?-Dec' 53?, Jul? 54-?

There were no further caravans because of the Dzungar wars. In 1762 Catherine replaced state caravans with free trade. Russian goods would be sold or bartered at Kyakhta.

== Goods and money ==
There was some amount of illegal and informal trade, but we have no numbers. There were many regulations prohibiting the export of certain goods and making others a state monopoly. The regulations changed frequently. Trade was mostly by barter and both sides sometimes tried to prevent the export of coined money.

Money value: The money value of goods had to be estimated, accounting practices were imperfect and there was some bribery. After the period of state caravans the value of goods exported was about: 600,000 rubles in 1755, 1,000,000 in 1768, 2,700,000 in 1780, 4,200,000 in 1800, and 5,700,000 in 1805. Tax revenue was about 20% of exports. The Kyakhta trade was perhaps 7% of Russian foreign trade. Another writer says that the annual trade in 1824-30 was between 5.5 and 7.8 million rubles and by mid-century it had reached 16 million rubles, but it is not clear whether this is exports, imports or both.

Exports: Furs were 70-85% by value, with the percentage tending to decline, especially as European-made goods increased. Squirrel was the largest by quantity, about 2-4 million pelts annually. Furs were followed by leather and hides, Russian and later foreign cloth and then miscellaneous goods. In the period of 1800-1805 about two thirds of Kyakhta exports were of non-Russian origin. The ratio before 1800 is not clear.

Imports: About 50-60% was cotton (it is not clear where this came from). Silk, both raw and processed was about a third. Tea imports started small but were 22% by value in 1792 and 40% ten years later. These were followed by tobacco and manufactured goods. An unknown part of the northbound trade was brought by "Bukharans", as the Russians called Central Asian traders.

== The Chinese side ==
South of Kyakhta the trade route had three sections.

- 1. 170 miles south to Urga. Here carts could be used. The land had more rain, grass, people, hills and rivers than further south.
- 2. 625 miles southeast to Kalgan by camel caravan across the Gobi Desert. This took about 30 days. Ox carts were used for heavy loads. Horses were used for speed and to supervise the caravans.
- 3. 100 miles southeast from Kalgan to Beijing over the mountains west of Beijing. This took about four days and used mules because of a difficult pass, probably to Juyong Pass.

The general tea trade in Mongolia was managed by seven companies, the largest of which was the Da Sheng Kui which was based in Hohhot after 1724. They dealt in other goods and interacted with the numerous lamaseries which were also political and economic centers.

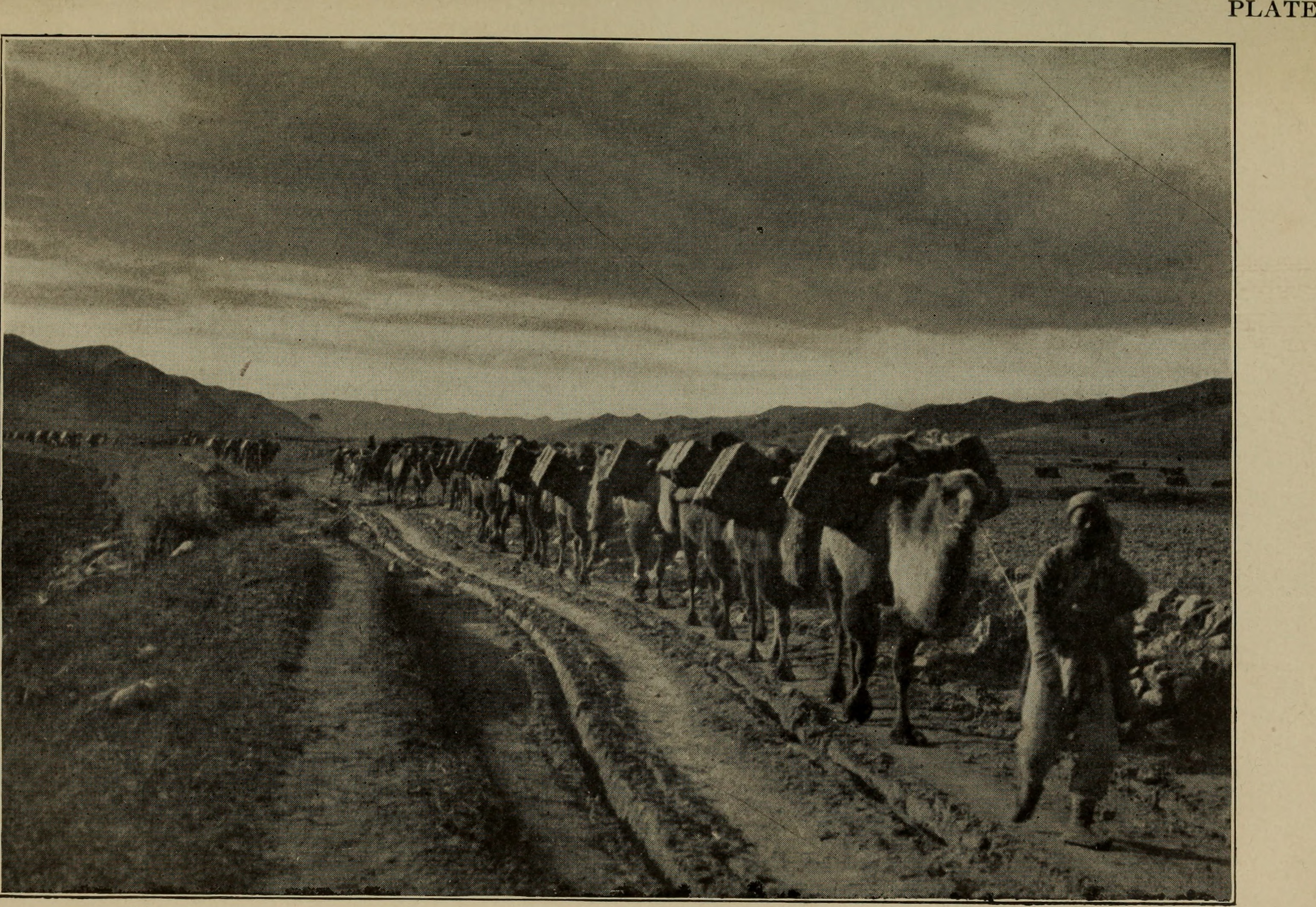
Transported with camels

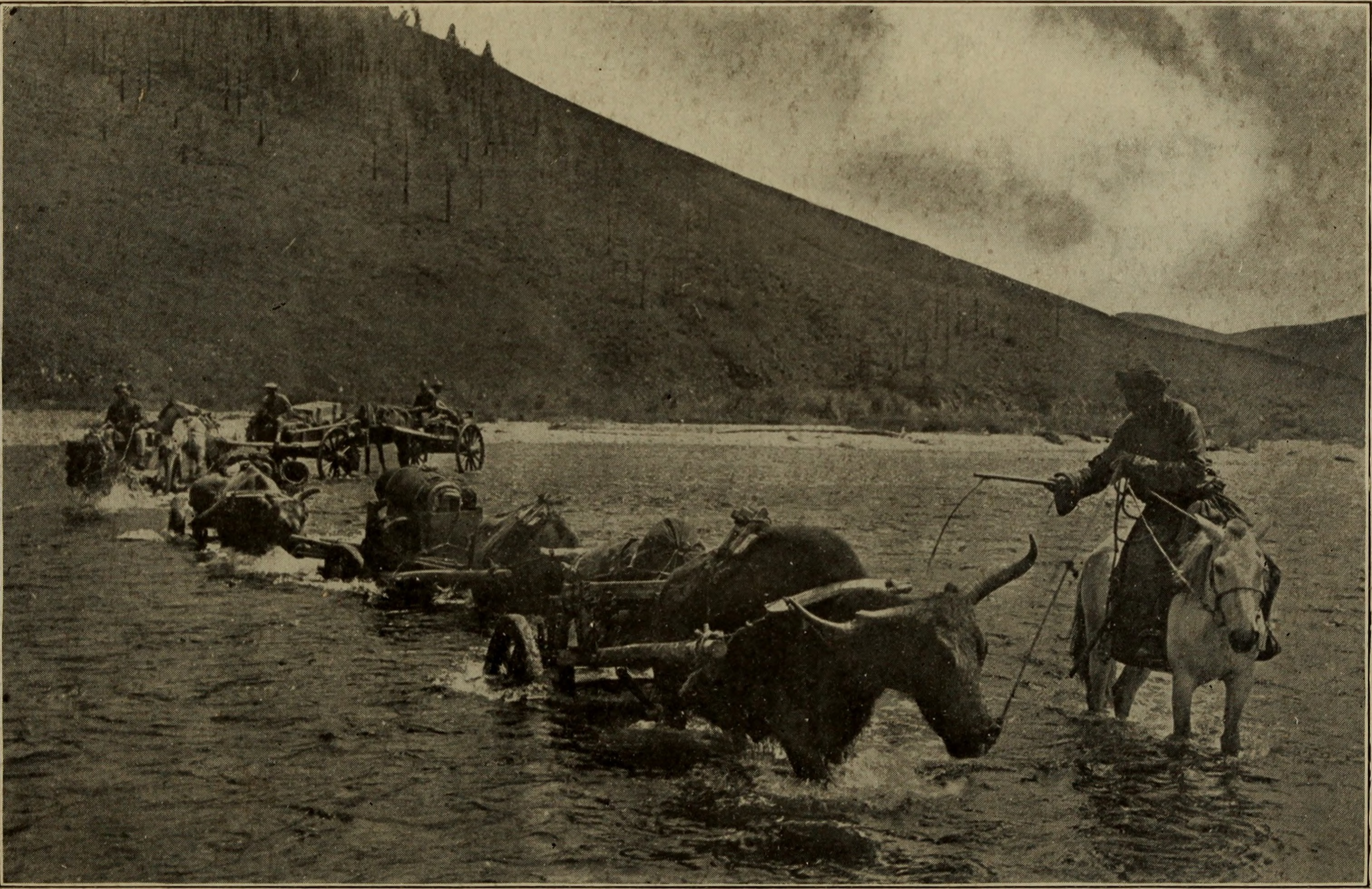
Cargo across the river
