= Tsurukaitu =

Coordinates: 50.1986°N 119.3275°E

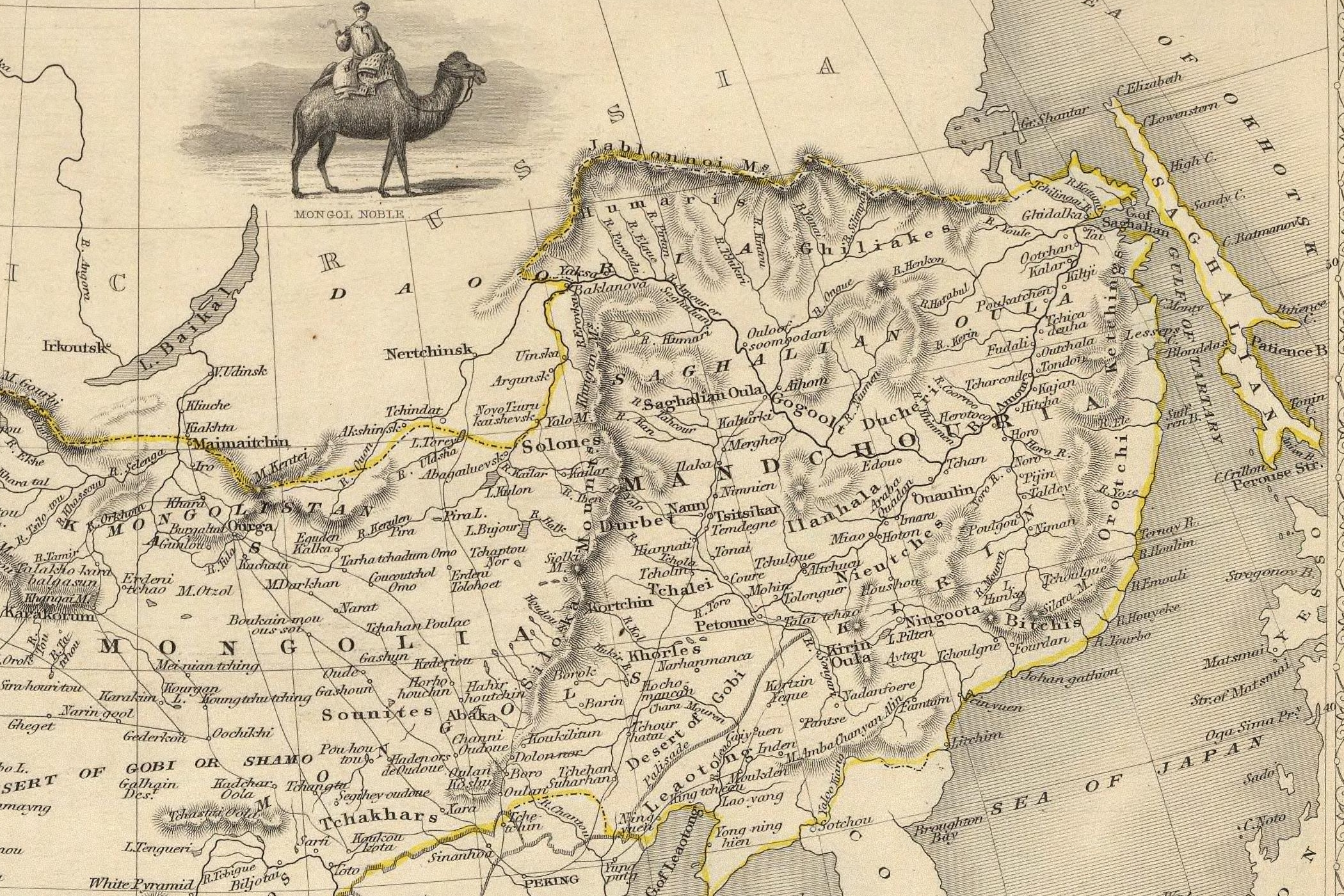
When this map is expanded Tsurukhaitu ('NovoTzuru-kaishevsk') can be seen directly east of Kyakhta

Tsurukhaitu was a trading post along the Russo-Chinese border north of Beijing during the eighteenth century. For background see Kyakhta trade. It was never successful because the Kyakhta route was easier than the long trek east from Lake Baikal. The trade route ran from Irkutsk east to Tsurukhaitu (about 7 weeks) and southeast through Qiqihar and the Shanhai Pass to Beijing, over 650 miles longer than the Kyakhta route. By the Treaty of Kyakhta (1727) all official trade was to be conducted through border posts near the future Kyakhta and Tsurukhaitu. Once the Treaty was completed Sava Vladislavich made elaborate plans for the two new posts, Tsurukhaitu being somewhat smaller. Previously trade in the area was from Nerchinsk to Qiqihar. The site was chosen in 1728 by Temofei Burtsov, a commissar of the Argun silver mines(sic) and a Chinese officer. Construction did not begin until 1736 because of obstruction by a local official and the distance that lumber had to be carried. The site was poor, firewood was over 25 miles distant and it was frequently flooded by the Argun River. In 1756 to fort was moved downstream to a new site. Unlike Kyakhta, the Manchus never erected a fort on their side of the border. Instead it was visited for about a month in early summer by merchants and border inspectors. In 1733 the official caravan tried to return by Tsurukhaitu rather than Kyakhta. Goods were spoiled due to lack of covered storage at the fort, they had difficulty finding laborers and it took all summer to travel west to Irkutsk. Maximum Russian exports at Tsurukhaitu were 2,845 rubles in 1768. The Kyakhta trade grew from 300,000 rubles in 1727 to 5,000,000 in 1805.

Today the old and new sites are the villages of Starotsurukhaitui and Novotsurukhaitui with populations of about 900 and 1800 respectively. The name comes from an Evenki word for pike.
