= Maimaicheng =

Maimaicheng (simplified Chinese: 买卖城; traditional Chinese: 買賣城; pinyin: Mǎimàichéng), was Chinese toponym meaning (literally) "trade town" or "trading post". Maimaichengs were found in border posts and towns of Outer Mongolia from the 18th to early 20th centuries. Maimaicheng may refer to:

- Altanbulag, Selenge
- Amgalan town, (until the early 20th century), today in Bayanzürkh District of Ulan Bator
- part of medieval Khovd (city)
