= Thomas Garvine =

Scottish surgeon (1690–1766)

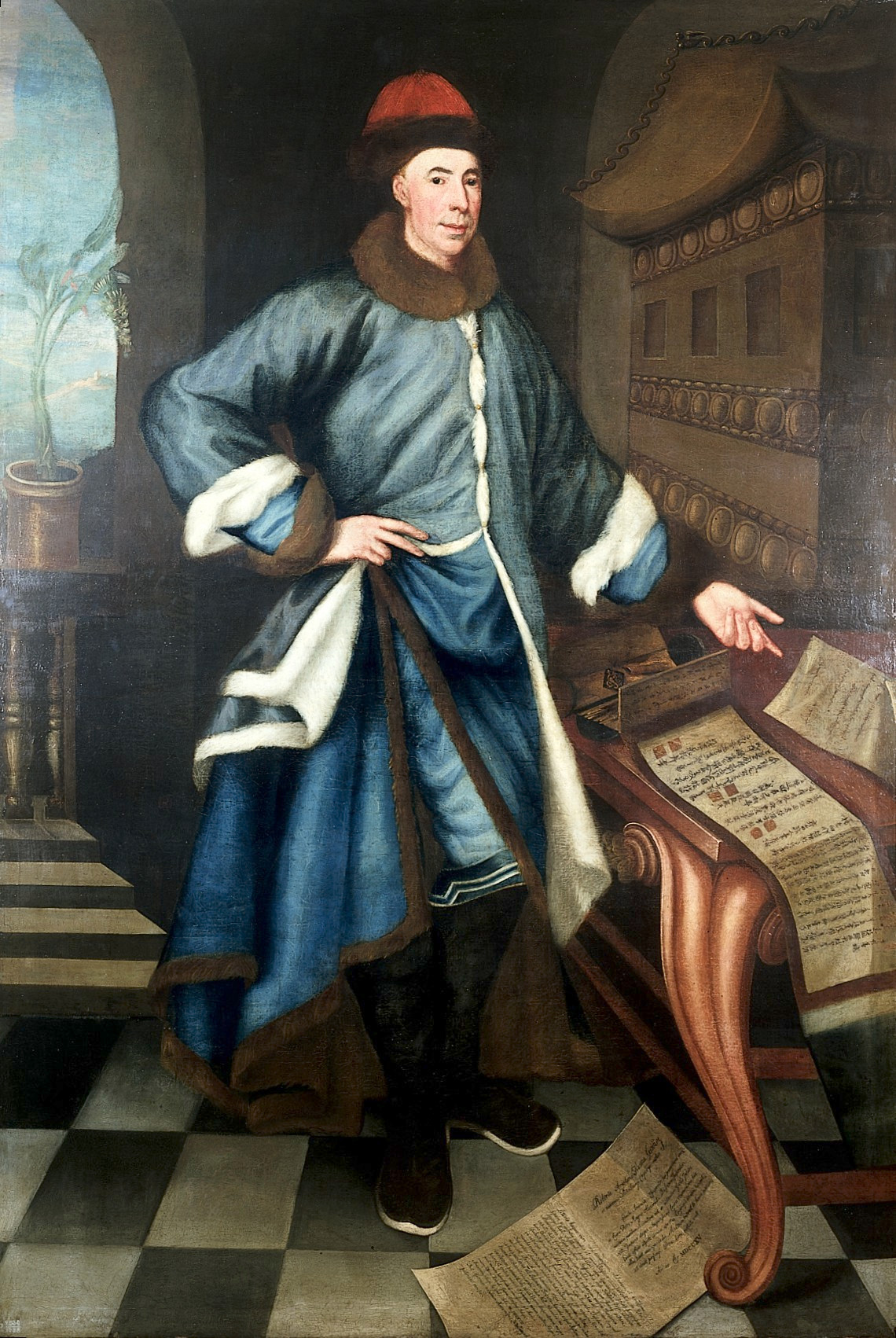
Thomas Garvine wearing the blue coat given him in China

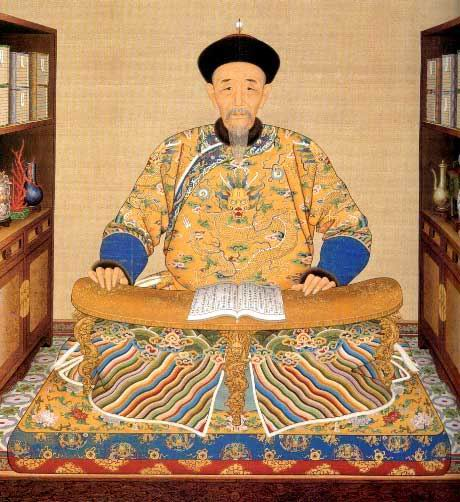
The Kangxi Emperor.

Thomas Garvine (1690–1766), born in Ayr, was a Scottish surgeon who was part of a delegation that journeyed from Saint Petersburg, Russia, to Beijing, China, in 1715–1716. He treated the Kangxi Emperor of China. In 1717, he left China, returned to Russia and, subsequently, to Scotland, where he practiced medicine and became the provost of Ayr.

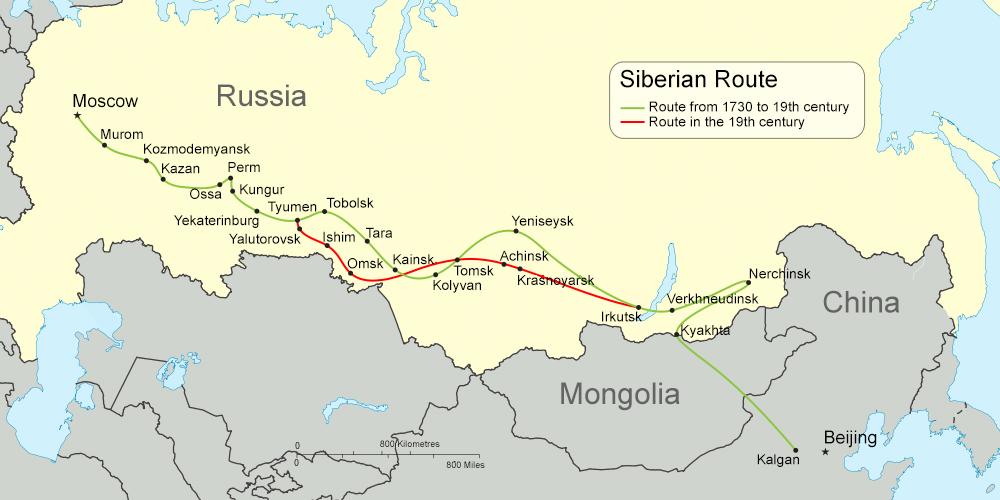
Garvine followed the later-named Siberian Route.

== China ==
The Jesuits had provided Chinese emperors with medical care for more than a century. In 1713, only one aged Jesuit remained in Peking and the Kangxi Emperor requested through the Russian governor of Siberia that Russia send priests and doctors to China. The Emperor apparently wanted an aphrodisiac. The Russians subsequently sent eight medical doctors to China of whom Garvine was the first. John Bell soon followed and wrote a detailed account of the journey and his stay in Peking.

Garvine joined the delegation of Lorenz Lange, a Swedish architect, who was in the employ of Russian tsar Peter the Great. The delegation consisted of Lange, Garvine, five Russian envoys, and six bodyguards. The principal purpose of the journey was to establish overland trade relations between Russia and China. Garvine was also probably charged with mastering the Chinese practice of inoculation against smallpox. The delegation left Saint Petersburg in August 1715 and arrived in Peking on 11 November 1716. On arrival, they were taken to see the emperor who asked Garvine to feel his pulse and pronounce on his health. Garvine felt his pulse and said, "His Majesty was very well."

Garvine commented that "at the court of the Emperor himself I was... greatly honored." Apparently because of his medical expertise, Garvine had difficulties obtaining permission to leave China and return to Russia. However, in June 1717, six months after his arrival, he was able to leave. He arrived in Moscow in February 1718. Two months later, he left Russia to return to Scotland.

== Later life ==
On return to Scotland, Garvine practiced medicine in Ayr and was elected for fourteen terms as the town provost between 1724 and 1759. A newspaper article credits him with having brought the cultivation of rhubarb back to Scotland. About 1738, Garvine had his portrait painted in the blue coat with fur lining that was given him by the emperor. He died in 1766.
