= Narrative of the Chinese Embassy to the Khan of the Tourgouth Tartars =

Diplomatic travelogue

Narrative of the Chinese Embassy to the Khan of the Tourgouth Tartars, in the years 1712, 13, 14, and 15 is a record of the travel to Kalmykia, written by Tulišen, a Manchu official who lived in the Qing dynasty.

The book was written in both Manchu and Chinese. The title is:

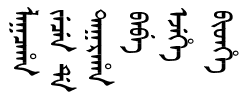
- in Manchu: Lakcaha jecen-de takūraha babe ejehe bithe (The book of the account of the process of having been to a distant region as an ambassador)
- in Chinese: Yiyulu (Chinese: 異域錄; pinyin: Yìyùlù, ‘Record of foreign regions’)

The English title is Narrative of the Chinese Embassy to the Khan of the Tourgouth Tartars, in the years 1712, 13, 14, and 15, by the Chinese Ambassador, and published by the Emperor's Authority, at Peking. This is from Sir George Thomas Staunton's translation in 1821. Although the Chinese version is more popular, the Manchu version offers higher quality information.

In 1712, Kangxi Emperor sent Tulišen and other emissaries to the Kalmyk Khanate to convey an imperial edict to Ayuka Khan of the Torghuts. They left Beijing, crossed Mongolia and then entered Russia. In order to avoid Dzungaria, they travelled through the Russian Empire to Saratov and entered into Ayuki's Torghut state (Turgūt gurun in Manchu). Having accomplished the mission, they returned to Beijing in 1715. Tulišen reported to the Emperor in both Manchu and Chinese. With the Emperor's permission, he published the book by editing these reports and private notes.

The formal purpose of this mission was to negotiate over the return of Ayuki's nephew Arabjur to Kalmykia. As a Buddhist, he made a pilgrimage to Tibet but was unable to return to Kalmykia because of the Dzungars' obstruction. Another purpose was to reconnoiter expanding Russia. In fact, the book is mostly devoted to the description of Russia. Some Russians suspected that the emissaries secretly encouraged the Torghuud to return to their homeland as Ayuki's great-grandson Ubashi did later.

In Tulisen's Manchu language record, it was mentioned that while the Torghuts were unlike the Russians, the "people of the Central Kingdom" (dulimba-i gurun 中國, Zhongguo) were like the Torghut Mongols, and the "people of the Central Kingdom" referred to the Manchus.

== Text ==
Manchu

- 滿文本

Chinese

- 異域錄·卷上
- 異域錄·卷下

English

- Narrative of the Chinese Embassy to the Khan of the Tourgouth Tartars, in the Years 1712, 13, 14, & 15. 士丹頓譯。倫敦：John Murray出版社，1821年。
