= Lifan Yuan =

Qing government agency in Inner Asia

The Lifan Yuan (Note: Chinese: 理藩院; pinyin: Lǐfān Yuàn; Manchu: ᡨᡠᠯᡝᡵᡤᡳ ᡤᠣᠯᠣ ᠪᡝ ᡩᠠᠰᠠᡵᠠ ᠵᡠᡵᡤᠠᠨ, romanized: tulergi golo be dasara jurgan; Mongolian: Гадаад Монголын төрийг засах явдлын яам, romanized: Gadaad Mongoliin töriig zasakh yabhdliin yaam) was an agency in the government of the Qing dynasty of China which administered the empire's Inner Asian territories such as Mongolia and oversaw the appointments of Ambans in Tibet. Until the 1860s, it was also responsible for the Qing's relations with the Russian Empire.

== Name ==
The name "Lifan Yuan" has various translations in English, including 'Board for National Minority Affairs', 'Court of Territorial Affairs', 'Board for the Administration of Outlying Regions', 'Office for Relations with Principalities', 'Office of Barbarian Control', 'Office of Mongolian and Tibetan Affairs', and 'Court of Colonial Affairs'. etc. The office was initially known as the Mongol Yamen (Note: Chinese: 蒙古衙門; pinyin: Měnggǔ Yámén; Manchu: ᠮᠣᠩᡤᠣ ᠵᡠᡵᡤᠠᠨ, romanized: monggo jurgan; lit. 'Mongol department') when it was first created in 1636. In 1639 the department was renamed and expanded to Lifan Yuan in Chinese and Tulergi golo be dasara jurgan in Manchu. The Manchu name literally means 'department for the administration of outlying regions'. During the period of the late Qing reforms (or "New Policies"), the name was changed again to Lifan Ministry (Note: Chinese: 理藩部; pinyin: Lǐfān Bù) in 1907 and existed until the end of the Qing dynasty in 1912.

== Function ==
Prior to the establishment of the Zongli Yamen, the Court also supervised the empire's relation with Russia under the treaties of Nerchinsk and Kyakhta. Lifan Yuan was exclusively staffed with members from the Eight Banners. Lifan Yuan was the closest administrative office that the Qing dynasty had that would have been comparable with a foreign policy department.

Guests of the Lifan Yuan were housed in the Bureau of Interpreters (Note: Chinese: 會同館; pinyin: Huìtóng Guǎn) in the southeast part of the Inner City, later also known as the Russian hostel (Note: Chinese: 俄羅斯館; pinyin: Éluósī Guǎn) due to the predominance of Russian visitors there. It was also called the South Pavilion (Note: Chinese: 南館; pinyin: Nánguǎn) to distinguish it from the North Pavilion (Note: Chinese: 北館; pinyin: Běiguǎn) where the Albazinians lived. From the Treaty of Kyakhta this residence became permanent.

There was also a Russian-Language Institute, (Note: Chinese: 俄羅斯文館; pinyin: Éluósī Wénguǎn) which was a school where Manchus learned to speak Russian. Founded in 1708, it was incorporated into the newly founded Tongwen Guan in 1862.

The Lifan Yuan was roughly a Qing version of the Xuanzheng Yuan (Note: Chinese: 宣政院; pinyin: Xuānzhèngyuàn) or Bureau of Buddhist and Tibetan Affairs, instituted by the Mongol-led Yuan dynasty for administering affairs in Tibet. It is to be distinguished from the Ministry of Rites, which was the traditional Chinese institution for dealing with all outsiders during the Ming dynasty. The Qing used the Board of Rites to deal with its tributary states to the south and east like the Joseon dynasty of Korea, the Nguyen dynasty of Vietnam, the Ryukyu Kingdom, and the Westerners who came by sea like the Dutch and the English. The Lifan Yuan was established during the reign of Huang Taiji to deal with the empire's Mongol subjects. It later continued to be a separate institution for handling the affairs of the empire's Inner Asian territories and its foreign relations with the Russians.

== See also ==
- Chinese Tartary
- Government of the Qing dynasty
- Administrative divisions of the Qing dynasty

Qing dynasty in Inner Asia

- Manchuria under Qing rule
- Mongolia under Qing rule
- Tibet under Qing rule
- Xinjiang under Qing rule

Similar institutions

- Bureau of Buddhist and Tibetan Affairs (Yuan dynasty)
- Mongolian and Tibetan Affairs Commission (Republic of China)
- State Ethnic Affairs Commission (People's Republic of China)
