= Tulišen =

Governor of Shaanxi
- In office 1725–1726
- Preceded by: Shi Wenzhuo
- Succeeded by: Famin

Personal details
- Born: 1667
- Died: 1741 (aged 73–74)
- Occupation: official, diplomat

Tulišen (also spelled Tulishen or Tulixen, Manchu:, Chinese: 圖理珅; pinyin: Túlǐshēn; sometimes 圖麗琛; 1667–1741) was a Manchu official and diplomat during the early Qing dynasty.

Tulišen was a member of the Manchu Plain Yellow Banner in the Eight Banners and belonged to the Ayan Gioro clan (阿顔覺羅氏). In 1712, after having served in several minor positions in the Qing government, the Kangxi Emperor appointed him to the Qing embassy to Ayuka Khan (r. 1673-1724) of the Torghuts, who had migrated to the lower Volga River, where they had formed the Kalmyk Khanate under Peter I of the Russian Empire. The whole journey through Russia's Siberian territories took three years and Tulišen later recorded the journey in a famous travelogue (Narrative of the Chinese Embassy to the Khan of the Tourgouth Tartars), which was published in 1723. This fascinated many readers in Europe, and later appeared in English, German, Russian and French translations.

In 1720 he dealt with the Izmailov mission to Peking. In 1727, Tulišen served as head of the Qing delegation when the Treaty of Kyakhta was negotiated with the Russian representative Savva Lukich Vladislavovich-Raguzinsky. However, upon his return to the capital Beijing, he was accused of misconduct during the treaty negotiations as well as having betrayed military secrets earlier in his career. He was tried and sentenced to death in 1728, but the Yongzheng Emperor eventually pardoned him. Following the enthronement of the Qianlong Emperor in 1735, Tulišen was given a number of important positions in the government, but was later forced to retire because of failing health.
