= Treaty of Kyakhta (1727) =

1727 treaty between China and Russia

- Type: Border treaty
- Signed: 25 June 1728
- Location: Kyakhta
- Negotiators: (Russian Empire) Sava Vladislavich; (Qing dynasty) Tulishen
- Signatories: (Russian Empire) Peter II; (Qing dynasty) Yongzheng Emperor
- Parties: Russian Empire; Qing dynasty
- Languages: Latin; Russian; Manchu

The Treaty of Kyakhta (or Kiakhta), (Note: Russian: Кяхтинский договор, romanized: Kjahtinskij dogovor, [ˈkʲæxtʲɪnskʲɪj dəɡɐˈvor]; Chinese: 布連斯奇條約/恰克圖條約; pinyin: Bùliánsīqí/Qiàkètú tiáoyuē, Xiao'erjing: بُلِيًاصِٿِ\ٿِاكْتُ تِيَوْيُؤ; Mongolian: Хиагтын гэрээ, romanized: Hiagtiin geree, [çʲæxˈtʰiŋ ɡiˈɾe]) along with the Treaty of Nerchinsk (1689), regulated the relations between Imperial Russia and the Qing Empire of China until the mid-19th century. It was signed by Tulišen and Count Sava Lukich Raguzinskii-Vladislavich at the border city of Kyakhta on 23 August 1727.

== Results ==
- Diplomatic and trade relations were established that lasted until the mid-19th century.
- It established the northern border of Mongolia (what was then part of the Qing-Russian border).
- The caravan trade from Kyakhta opened up (Russian furs for Chinese tea).

Qing subjects are referred to as those from "Dulimbai gurun" in Manchu in the Treaty.

== Background ==
By the 1640s Russian adventurers had taken control of the forested area north of Mongolia and Manchuria. From 1644, the rule of the Qing dynasty established its capital in Beijing and took control of the Central Plains region. In 1689 the Treaty of Nerchinsk established the northern border of Manchuria north of the present line. The Russians retained Trans-Baikalia between Lake Baikal and the Argun River north of Mongolia.

At the time of Nerchinsk what is now Mongolia had just been captured by the Oirat Dzungar Khanate. These people were gradually pushed back westward. This raised the question of the Russo-Manchu border in Mongolia and opened the possibility of trade from the Lake Baikal area to Peking. The Manchus wanted an agreement because they were worried about possible Russian support for the Oirats and did not want disobedient subjects fleeing to the Russians. Many of the Cossacks in Siberia were rather close to bandits and could cause trouble if not restrained by the Tsar. The Russians had neither a reason nor the means to push south and were more interested in profitable trade. The Russians had no hope of sending a serious army this far east and the Manchus had no interest in the frozen forests of Siberia.

== Negotiations ==
From the 1710s the Kangxi Emperor began to put pressure on Saint Petersburg for an agreement, largely by interfering with the caravan trade. The Lev Izmailov mission in 1719/22 to Peking produced no results.

Just before his death, Peter the Great decided to deal with the border problem. On 23 October 1725 Sava Vladislavich, a Serb in the Russian service, left Saint Petersburg with 1,500 soldiers and 120 staff including map-makers and priests. Before reaching Peking in November 1726, he picked up Lorenz Lange and Ivan Bucholz and sent out cartographers to survey the border. The negotiators on the Manchu side were Tulishen and Dominique Parrenin. After six months a draft treaty was worked up, but it became clear that neither side had adequate maps. In May Vladslavich and Tulishen went back to Selenginsk near Lake Baikal to get the waiting maps. By 31 August a draft treaty was drawn up ('Treaty of Bura' after a nearby river). Work quickly began setting up border markers starting from Kyakhta on the Selenga River. The 'Abagaitu Letter' listed 63 markers from Kyakhta east to the Argun River. The 'Selenginsk Letter' listed 24 markers west from Kyakhta to the "Shabindobaga River on the northwest slopes of the Altay Mountains". The 'Treaty of Bura' was sent to Peking to be combined with work already done there. The result was sent back to the frontier and the Treaty of Kyakhta was signed on 25 June 1728. The treaty had three official versions, in Russian, in Latin and in Manchu. No official Chinese version of the treaty exists.

== Articles ==
The treaty had eleven articles, the core of which dealt with commercial relations and diplomatic immunities. (This list, probably from Perdue, differs somewhat from the list given by March.)

- Articles I and XI spoke of eternal peace and cooperation between the two nations, and concerned itself with the language and organization of the rest of the document.
- Article II dealt with the exchange of fugitives.
- Article III, along with VII, delineated the new borders, leaving only territory along the Irtysh River unassigned. The fate of this land, according to the treaty, would be determined in the future by ambassadors or further correspondence between the two nations' capitals.
- Article VI dealt with commercial relations; from this treaty and others, Russia gained far more favorable commercial arrangements with the Chinese than most European countries, who traveled by sea and traded at Canton. Russia would send a caravan to Peking every three years and continuous border trade would be conducted at Kyakhta and Tsurukaitu in Manchuria. See Kyakhta trade.
- Article V allowed for the establishment of a Russian religious institution in Beijing.
- Article VI, along with IX, concerned itself with the forms and modes of diplomatic intercourse between the two nations, both of which had complex systems of bureaucracy and protocol.
- Article VIII, along with X, discussed the methods and procedures for settling future disputes.

== Convention of Kyakhta (1768) ==
On 18 October 1768 a Convention was signed modifying Article X of the original treaty making punishments more explicit. This was due to the Qing extermination of the Dzungar Khanate, which caused rebels including Amursana to flee across the border, and other problems which led the Chinese to curtail trade in 1762 and suspend it in 1765.

== Kyakhta International Protocol (1792) ==
The Kyakhta trade between Qing and Russia was very important to Russia as one of its main sources of income. The Qing was aware of this and occasionally used to suspend the trade to exert pressure on the Russian rulers. In 1784 some Russian Buryats and the Uriankhais of the Qing together robbed the Chinese merchant in the Khövsgöl region. The Russian way of punishing the robbers irritated the Qing side and became a new reason to suspend the trade for 7 years. Over these seven years before the two empires came to mutual agreement many events occurred that expose problems in the relations between them. On 8 February 1792, they signed the "International Protocol" (known as "恰克圖市約" in Chinese) in Kyakhta which confirmed the validity of the Sino-Russian Treaty of Kyakhta.

== See also ==
- Treaty of Kulja (1851)
- Treaty of Tarbagatai (1864)
- Treaty of Saint Petersburg (1881)
