= Sava Vladislavich =

Russian diplomat (1669–1738)

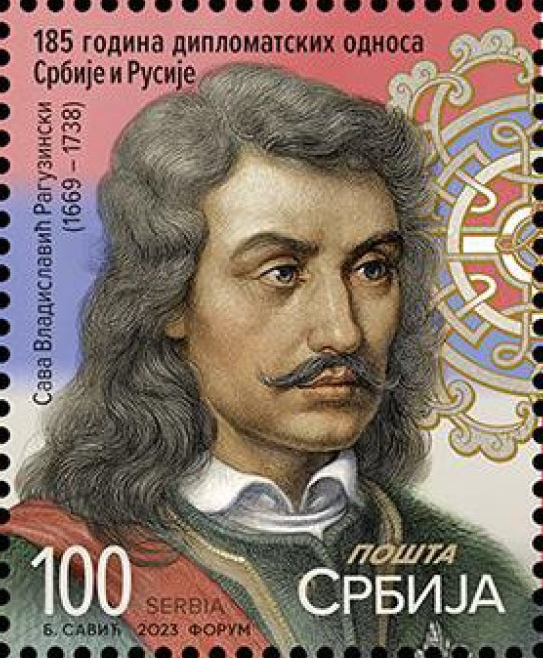
- Vladislavich on a 2023 stamp of Serbia
- Born: 16 January 1669; Gacko, Ottoman Empire
- Died: 17 June 1738 (aged 69); Saint Petersburg, Russian Empire
- Occupations: Diplomat, trader

Count Sava Lukich Vladislavich-Raguzinsky (Russian: Са́вва Луки́ч Рагузи́нский-Владиславич; Serbian: Сава Владиславић Рагузински, Sava Vladislavić Raguzinski; 16 January 1669 – 17 June 1738) was a Russian and Serbian diplomat, merchant, adventurer. He was in the employ of Peter the Great. Vladislavich conducted important diplomatic negotiations in Constantinople, Rome and Beijing. His most lasting achievement was the Treaty of Kiakhta, which regulated relations between the Russian Empire and the Qing Empire until the mid-19th century. He penned a number of pamphlets, monographs, treaties and letters concerned with liberating the lands of the Slavs, then occupied by the Ottoman Empire and the forces of Leopold I.

== Background ==
Vladislavich was born in 1669, in the village of Jasenik near Gacko, Bosnia Eyalet, Ottoman Empire. His father, Luka Vladislavić, was a Serb landlord. The family was driven out from Gacko by the local Turks and settled in the Republic of Ragusa. His father's involvement in trade allowed Sava to be sent to the Republic of Venice, then Spain and France where he acquired broad education. The well-being of the citizens of Ragusa depended on maritime commerce; Sava Vladislavich was no exception. With his knowledge and monetary assistance from his father, he set out on his own trading venture.

== Russian service ==
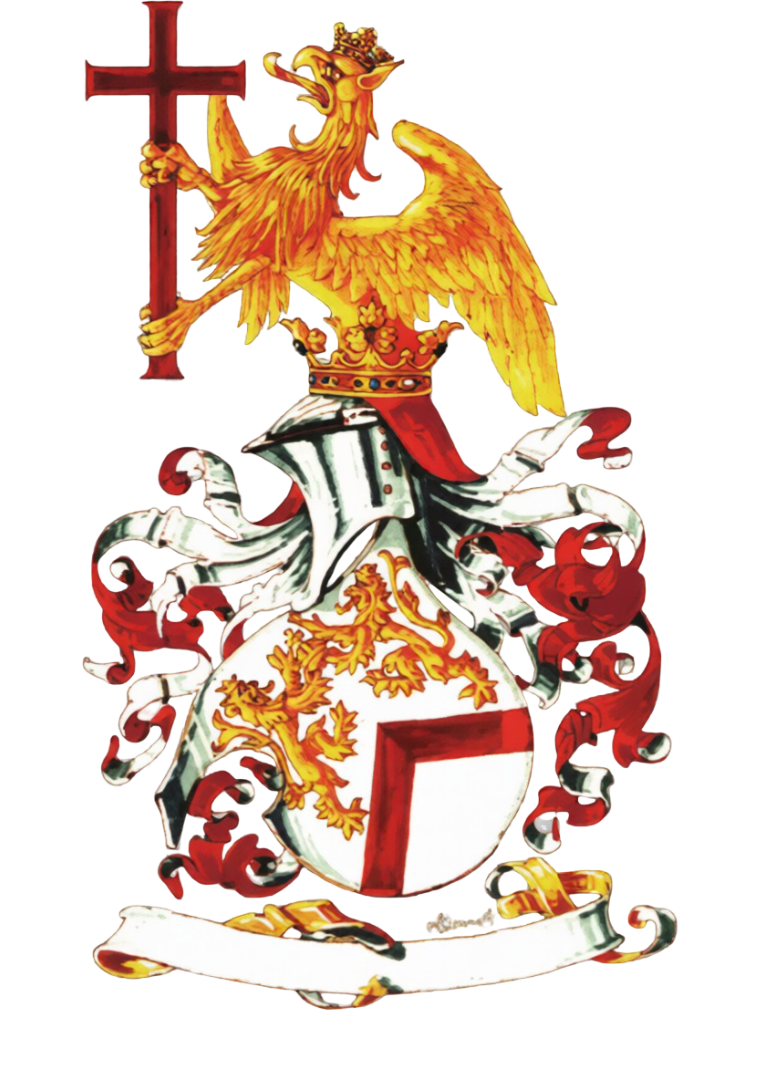
Coat of arms of Sava Vladislavich

A commercial project brought the young merchant to Constantinople, where, in the absence of a permanent Russian mission, he was entrusted with various tasks by the Russian foreign ministers Vasily Galitzine and Emelian Ukraintsev. It so happened that his own commercial interests always went hand-in-hand with those of the Russian government. In 1702, he made the acquaintance of Peter the Great in Azov. With an eye toward profiting from the fur trade with Russia, Vladislavich visited Moscow in the next year, but, after obtaining important privileges from the Tsar, returned to Constantinople, where he represented Russia's interests, in tandem with Pyotr Andreyevich Tolstoy, until the Battle of Poltava. It was he who purchased for the Tsar a black page, Ibrahim Hannibal, the ancestor of the great Pushkin. In 1708, he relocated to Moscow and soon received from the Tsar the lands in Little Russia, where Nezhin was made the centre of his commercial operations. In 1710, he received the rank of court adviser.

At the time Russia did not have access to the warm sea, and the ports in the Baltic were held by the English and the Dutch. Peter the Great built St. Petersburg to have a Russian port in the north, so as not to depend on the blackmail of Western traders who determined the prices of warehouses, had a monopoly on trade and kept Russia captive. However, the northern climate was severe as always, so Petar tried to go south. He asked Vladislavich to determine where ports could be built on the Black Sea coast. That project had very far-reaching consequences for the development of the Black Sea Fleet, which was made on the basis of Vladislavich's first report.

== The Battle of Poltava ==
On 8 July 1708 the Battle of Poltava took place. It is alleged that Vladislavich, with his skill, de facto saved Peter in a conflict with King Charles XII of Sweden. The Swedes agreed with the Turks to attack Russia on two fronts, but Vladislavich found out about it from trusted intelligence sources and told Peter once he arrived from Constantinople in 1708. The Russian tsar was furious because the conflict had already begun to brew. The count asked him for money to bribe the Turks, who had already been bribed by the Swedes. When asked by Peter what he would do if he failed, Vladislavich answered that the only pledge he could offer was his head. Peter accepted the proposal and the matter was settled.

== The Balkans ==
The "Illyrian Count" (as Vladislavich liked to style himself) maintained trade contacts with fellow Serbs and was under the impression that they would rise in revolt against the Sultan as soon as the Tsar invaded the Danubian Principalities. Having launched the invasion in 1711, Peter sent him on a mission to Moldavia and Montenegro, whose population Vladislavich was expected to incite to rebellion. Little came of these plans, despite the assistance of a pro-Russian colonel, Michael Miloradovich (the ancestor of Mikhail Miloradovich). There has been preserved an inscription from that time, in a chronicle:

In the year 1711 Mikhail Miloradovich came to Montenegro, to the great misfortune of the Monastery and of Montenegro.... [for Vizir Kiuprili in 1714] razed Montenegro and destroyed the church and the Monastery.

== Venice ==
From 1716 to 1722, Vladislavich resided in Venice, Italy, dividing his time between the advocacy of his own private interests and those of the Tsar. Vladislavich entertained the aristocracy of Venice as well as foreign visitors, Ernest Louis, Landgrave of Hesse-Darmstadt (1667–1739), Charles I, Landgrave of Hesse-Kassel (1654–1730), Count Girolamo of Colloredo-Waldsee, Governor of the Duchy of Milan (then under Austrian rule), Prince Teodor Konstanty Lubomirski, Anselm Franz, 2nd Prince of Thurn and Taxis, and Count Charachin.

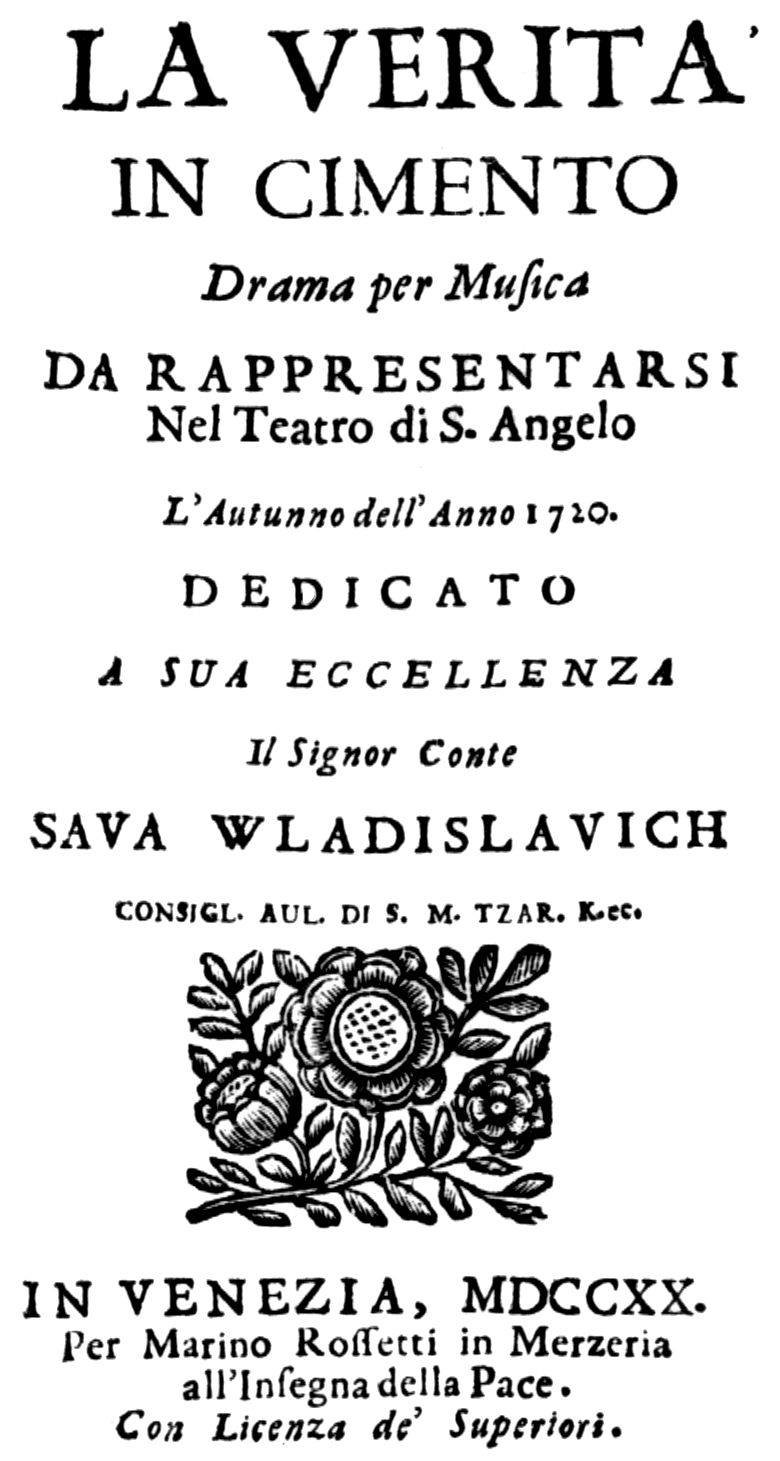
Antonio Vivaldi - La verità in cimento - title page of the libretto - Venice 1720

Antonio Vivaldi dedicated La verità in cimento to Vladislavich in Venice in 1720. While in Italy, among other commissions, he supervised the education of Russian nobles (such as painter Ivan Nikitich Nikitin) and prepared important, secret political treaties with Pope Clement XI. It was he who acquired in Venice an assortment of marble statues that still decorate the Summer Garden in St. Petersburg.

Among many tasks, Sava Vladislavich had, politically, the most important task for Russia, and that is the establishment of a concordat with the Roman Curia. During his stay in Italy, he was in direct contact with the Pope, about which Vivaldi writes in his dedication. For Italians, as well as all Catholics, the Pope is a god on earth, and the Serbian count negotiated a concordat with him for six years. That part of Sava's activity is not well known enough. There are certain documents about the negotiations, and they are most likely in the Vatican archives. The Russians have only occasional Vladislavich report on the progress of negotiations.

== Treaty of Kyakhta ==
Vladislavich was made ambassador plenipotentiary to China on 18 June 1725. He retraced the steps of Spathari's travels, leading a large Russian mission to negotiate a new treaty with the Qing Empire. The extended and fractious negotiations with the Qing Emperor and his officials resulted in the Treaty of Burya, which adopted the doctrine of Uti Possidetis Juris for delimiting the Russo-Chinese border. In 1728, these provisions were finalized in the Treaty of Kyakhta, which also incorporated Vladislavich's proposal on the construction of an Orthodox chapel in Beijing.

Viewing the commonly agreed border as an "everlasting demarcation line between the two empires", Vladislavich spared no effort to further trade and commerce on the border. He personally selected the location for the Russian trade factory of Kyakhta, where the district of Troitskosavsk commemorates his name. As a reward for his part in securing a favourable treaty with China and establishing the Tea Road between the two countries, he was invested with the Order of St. Alexander Nevsky. He also drafted a comprehensive project of financial reform and left a detailed description of the Qing Empire. In a secret memorandum (1731), Vladislavich cautioned the Russian government against ever going to war with China.

== Writings ==
In 1722, Sava Vladislavich published his most famous work, a translation in Russian of Mavro Orbin's Il regno de gli Slavi (1601; The Realm of the Slavs), which included a long passage on Kosovo. It was a tremendous sensation in Russia and the Balkans and attracted the attention and discussion of all cultured society. It was said that "nowhere was there a rather large library that did not have a copy of Sava Vladislavich's translation of Orbini."

== Legacy ==
According to Serbian poet and diplomat Jovan Dučić, descendant of Sava's either half-brother or first cousin Duka (whence the eponymic family name Dučić), "Sava Vladislavich occupied a distinguished position among Russian diplomats in the eighteenth century. During two and a half decades, he took part in all important events of the Russian empire as a legate of the Czar (Peter the Great) and Czarina (Catherine I of Russia)."

The fortress of Troitsko-Savsk (now Kyakhta) was named after him at the time when he was negotiating a second treaty in 1727 between Russia and China.

The historian Marie–Janine Calic describes him as an "intercultural mediator par excellence".

== See also ==
- Serbs in Russia
- Matija Zmajević
- Semyon Zorich
- Peter Tekeli
- Georgi Emmanuel
- Simeon Piščević
- Jovan Albanez
- Jovan Šević
- Anto Gvozdenović
- Mikhail Miloradovich
- Ilya Duka
- Dmitry Horvat
- Marko Voinovich
- Marko Ivelich

== Bibliography ==
- Orbini, Mauro (1601). Il Regno de gli Slavi hoggi corrottamente detti Schiavoni. Pesaro: Apresso Girolamo Concordia.
- Орбин, Мавро (1968). Краљевство Словена. Београд: Српска књижевна задруга.
- Milovan Djilas, Njegoš: Poet, Prince, Bishop, Introduction and Translation by Michael B. Petrovich; Preface by William Jovanovich (Harcourt, Brace, Jovanovich, New York, 1966).
