= History of Ulaanbaatar =

History of the capital city of Mongolia

The history of Ulaanbaatar, the capital of Mongolia, dates to 1639 when it was first established as a moveable monastery.

A balbal or ancient human statue was chosen as the ceremonial foundation site (Shav) of the city when it settled in 1778 at its current location. Presently, a modern stone turtle sits atop the spot of the ancient balbal near Sükhbaatar Square in the city center.

== Prehistory ==
Human habitation at the site of Ulaanbaatar dates from the Lower Paleolithic. Alexey Okladnikov's archeological work in 1949 and 1960 revealed many Paleolithic sites on Mt. Bogd Khan Uul, Buyant-Ukhaa and Mt. Songinokhairkhan. In 1962 various Paleolithic tools were discovered at Mt. Songinokhairkhan as well as Buyant-Ukhaa (23 stone tools) that scholars date from 300,000 years ago to 40,000-12,000 years ago. Okladnikov also revealed an Upper Paleolithic (40,000-12,000 years ago) site on the south-east base of the Zaisan Hill on the northern edge of Mt. Bogd Khan Uul. Byambyn Rinchen mentions it as an inspiration for his prehistoric novel Zaan Zaluudai. The lower strata of this bistratified settlement located at the present-day Zaisan Memorial revealed tools and materials fashioned according to the Levallois technique. These Upper Paleolithic people hunted mammoth and woolly rhinoceros, the bones of which are found abundantly around Ulaanbaatar.

Red ochre rock paintings from the Bronze Age (1st millennium BCE) are to be found at Ikh Tenger Gorge on the north side of Mt. Bogd Khan Uul facing the city. The paintings show human figures, horses, eagles and abstract designs like horizontal lines and large squares with over a hundred dots within them. The same style of painting from the same era is found very close to the east of the city at Gachuurt, as well as in Khovsgol Aimag and southern Siberia, indicating a common South Siberian nomadic pastoral culture. Mt. Bogd Khan Uul was probably an important religious cult location for these people. Bronze Age square slab tombs are found at the Shajin Khurakh and Tur Khurakh gorges of Mount Bogd Khan Uul facing the city.

To the north of Ulaanbaatar there are the vast Noin-Ula Xiongnu (Hunnu) royal tombs which are over 2,000 years old. A Xiongnu tomb has been found in Chingeltei district. The Xiongnu tombs of Belkh Gorge near Dambadarjaalin monastery are under city protection. The Xiongnu tombs of Mount Songinokhairkhan however are under national protection. Wooden cups, plates, ceramic vessels and a 12 branch deer horn were found in the "Xiongnu Queen Tomb" (Hunnu Khatni Bulsh) at the Baruun Boginiin Am gorge of Mount Bogd Khan Uul. Six tombs around this tomb show signs of ancient looting. The Wuhuan carried out large scale looting of Xiongnu tombs in 87-74 BC. Located on the banks of the sacred Tuul River ("Khatun Tuul" or Queen Tuul in legend), the area of Ulaanbaatar was well within the sphere of nomadic empires such as the Xiongnu (Hunnu) (209BC-93AD), Xianbei (Sumbe) (93AD-4th century), Rouran (Nirun) (402-555), Göktürk (555-745), Uighur (745-840), Khitan (907-1125) and Mongol Empire (1206–1368). At Nalaikh District there is the important Stele of Tonyukuk (c. 722 AD) with an Old Turkic inscription in the Orkhon alphabet.

== Mongol Empire ==
Wang Khan Toghrul (1130-1203) of the Keraites, a Nestorian Christian monarch who was identified as the legendary Prester John by Marco Polo, is said to have had his palace here (the Black Forest of the Tuul River) and forbade hunting in the holy mountain Bogd Uul. The ruins of his palace (15x27 metres with a gate facing south) was found in Songinokhairkhan District in 1949 and excavated by D. Navaan in 2006. This brick palace influenced by Chinese architecture, later also called the Third Palace of Genghis Khan or Yesui Khatun's palace, is where Genghis Khan stayed with Yesui Khatun before attacking the Tangut in 1226. A drainage channel carried roof water out through the east and west gates of the complex. In 2003 Japanese and Koreans made special programs about this palace where many important events of Genghis Khan's life took place. Genghis Khan's father Yesukhei became blood brothers with Toghrul here and later Genghis Khan himself became son of Toghrul at this place.

The Secret History of the Mongols mentions this area in many places, for example in Paragraphs 115 and 264:

(After defeating the Merkits with Temujin and Jamukha)...Toghrul Khan returned home, following the edge of Mount Burkhan Khaldun, going past Ogort Forest, continuing past Gachuurt suvchid and Uliastai suvchid, hunting along the way, till he came to the Black Forest of the Tuul River. (SHM 115)

Genghis Khan...crossing the Indus River chased Jalaldin Sultan and Khan Malik till the land of the Hindu, but they escaped. So he took many border people of the Hindu region captive and came back bringing many camels and goats. From there Genghis Khan returned, spending the summer at the Irtysh River and reaching the Black Forest of the Tuul River in autumn of the Year of the Rooster (1225), where he set up his Ordo (royal camp) and spent the winter. (SHM 264) He rode against the Xi Xia the next year taking Queen Yesui with him.

In 1984 a rich 13th century tomb of a 50- to 60-year-old, 175 cm (69 in) tall warrior with an ornate golden belt was excavated at Dadart Uul of Mt. Songinokhairkhan. He was buried with a sheep scapula, a dagger with iron blade and wooden handle, a 65 cm (26 in) bark quiver with three iron arrows inside, two light curved stirrups (13th century type) and remains of a cast iron tripod cauldron. His highly ornate belt composed of 39 parts with a scarab at his right hip has led to speculations this is the tomb of Jamukha. A simple 13th century rock painting of a Mongolian woman with distinct Mongolian headdress can be seen on the north side of Mt Bogd Khan Uul. Abtai Sain Khan is said to have worshipped the mountain in the 16th century as well. The French missionary Gerbillon camped at the site of Ulaanbaatar on August 5, 1698 and continued north the next day along the Selbe River valley (present-day Sukhbaatar District). He says in his Journal:

On the 5th, we made fifty li, which should actually be reduced to thirty-five li (17km), West-North-West, because of a big detour we made in the mountains, holding to the south and south-west to avoid the marshes of the plains. We camped on the banks of the Tula, which separates into many branches, still ornamented by beautiful trees. On the way we passed many streams that empty into the River, and for a distance of about thirty li, we followed the edge of a high mountain, called Han-alin (Mount Bogd Khan Uul), covered by a grand forest of pine and fir trees, full of bears, wild boars and deer. We camped in the valley that is at the foot of this mountain, on the bank of the same River.

== 18th century ==
The Manchu envoy Tulišen wrote an account of his travels through this region in 1712, describing how his party rested and fished ten to twenty salmon and pike in the river "Tu-la" while one Ko-tcha-eur-too killed a deer with a gun in the "Han-shan" (i.e., Khan Uul). He also describes the "rich and luxuriant" nature around the "Sung-kee-na" mountains (i.e., Mount Songino Khairkhan). Before Khalkha Mongolian nobles went and pledged allegiance to the Manchu emperor at Dolon Nor (formerly Kublai Khan's summer capital Xanadu) in 1691, the area of present-day Ulaanbaatar was under the control of Tusheet Khan Chakhundorj the brother of Zanabazar. In 1691 Chakhundorj's eldest son Galdandorj was given the title Jun Wang at Dolon Nor and given the area of present-day Ulaanbaatar. From that time onwards it became a clearly demarcated hereditary princedom called the Darkhan Chin Wangiin Khoshuu (Banner of the Darkhan Chin Wang). The Banner was centered on Mount Bogd Khan Uul and its boundaries are described in historical records of the period. Galdandorj (1691-1692) was the first Darkhan Chin Wang. His successors are: his eldest son Dondovdorj (1692-1743), Rinchendorj (1743-1755), Khajivdorj (1757-1759), Gejeedorj (1759-1771), Tsevdendorj (1771-1774), Sundevdorj (1774-1798), Nyambuudorj (1799-1832) all the way till Darkhan Chin Wang Puntsagtseren (1914-1921). Starting from 1728 till 1921 the 21 banners of Tusheet Khan Aimag held the "Khan Uuliin Chuulgan" (Assembly of Khan Uul) every three years at the north side of Mount Bogd Khan Uul, the site of Ulaanbaatar. The Assembly discussed a wide range of issues including finances, military census, livestock tax and legal issues. There were 26 Presidents of the Khan Uul Assembly starting from Tusheet Khan Vanjildorj (1728-1732) till Puntsagtseren (1914-1921). There were also a total 30 Deputy Presidents or Speakers. The 2nd Jebtsundamba Khutuktu was born at Mount Songinokhairkhan in present-day Ulaanbaatar in 1724 as the son of Darkhan Chin Wang Dondovdorj and Tsagaan Dari Bayart. Dondovdorj carried the titles Jun Wang, Darkhan Chin Wang, Khoshoi Chin Wang and Efu and also sat on the Tusheet Khan throne for two years (1700-1702). He played a part in bringing Urga inside his banner territory. From 1733 to 1743 he was both the Said (Minister-governor) of Urga and the President of the Khan Uul Assembly. One of his wives was Amarlingui Hichiyengui the 6th daughter of the Kangxi Emperor whom he received in marriage in 1697. Her tomb the Gunj Temple (1740) is partially intact in the forests north-east of Ulaanbaatar. Dondovdorj, an accomplished poet, composed the song "Tumen Ekh" praising a race horse. In 1696 Zanabazar and the Khalkha Mongolian nobles returned from Dolon Nor and camped at the north side of Mount Bogd Khan Uul. The gorge where khans and princes camped was called Tur Khurakhyn Am (State Gathering Gorge) while the one where monks and abbots camped was named Shajin Khurakhyn Am (Religion Gathering Gorge). Nobles and lamas continued to meet at this place for the next 330 years. Nukhtiin Am, on the south of Ulaanbaatar, was where Zanabazar (1635-1723) consecrated and meditated under a tree called Janchivsembe, the shadow of which was used to choose the location of Gandan Monastery in 1838.

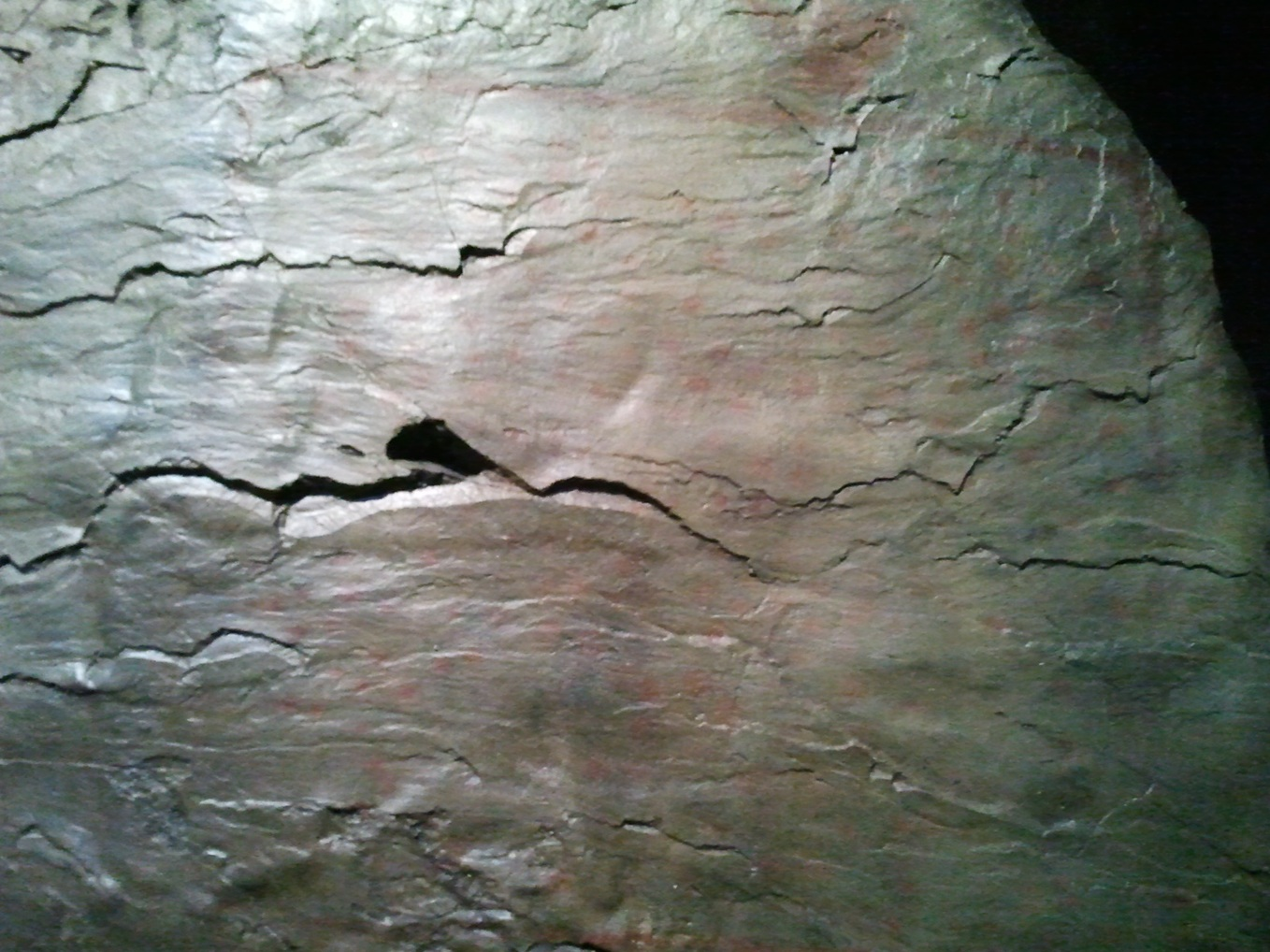
3000-year-old Bronze Age red ochre paintings.

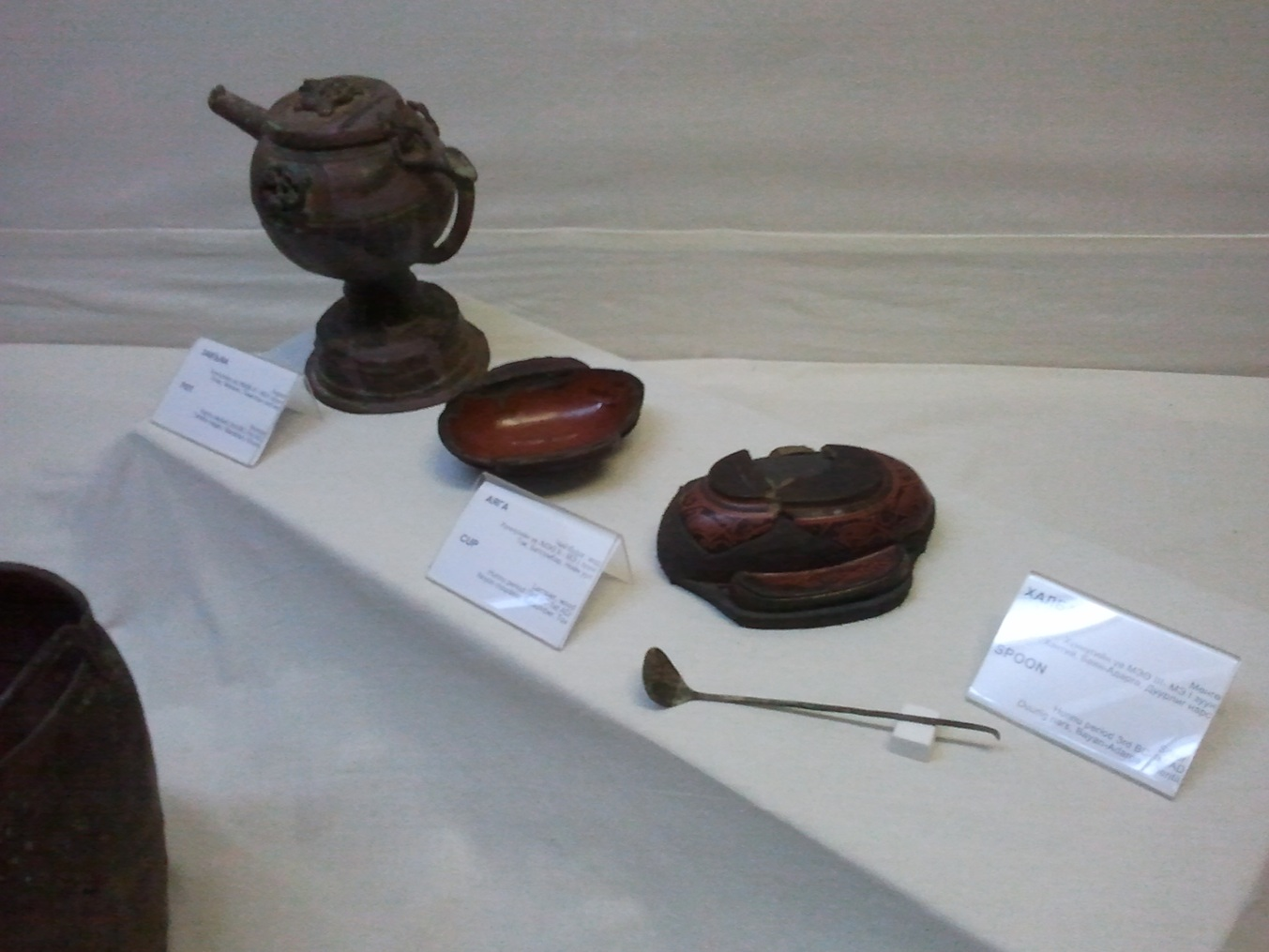
Inscribed royal cups from the Xiongnu (Hunnu) tombs just north of Ulaanbaatar.

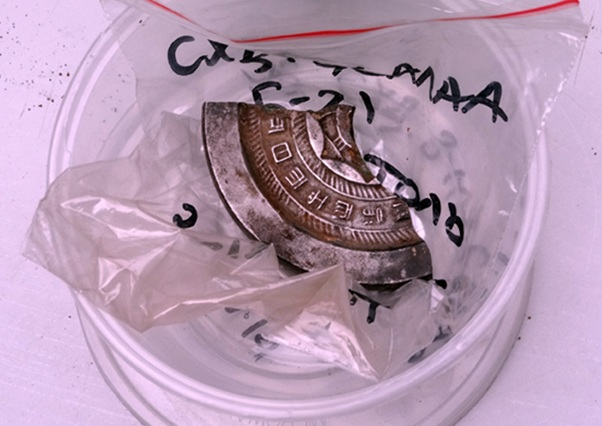
Bronze mirror with inscription found in Xiongnu tomb (c. 200BC) in Zuun Salaa, Ulaanbaatar.

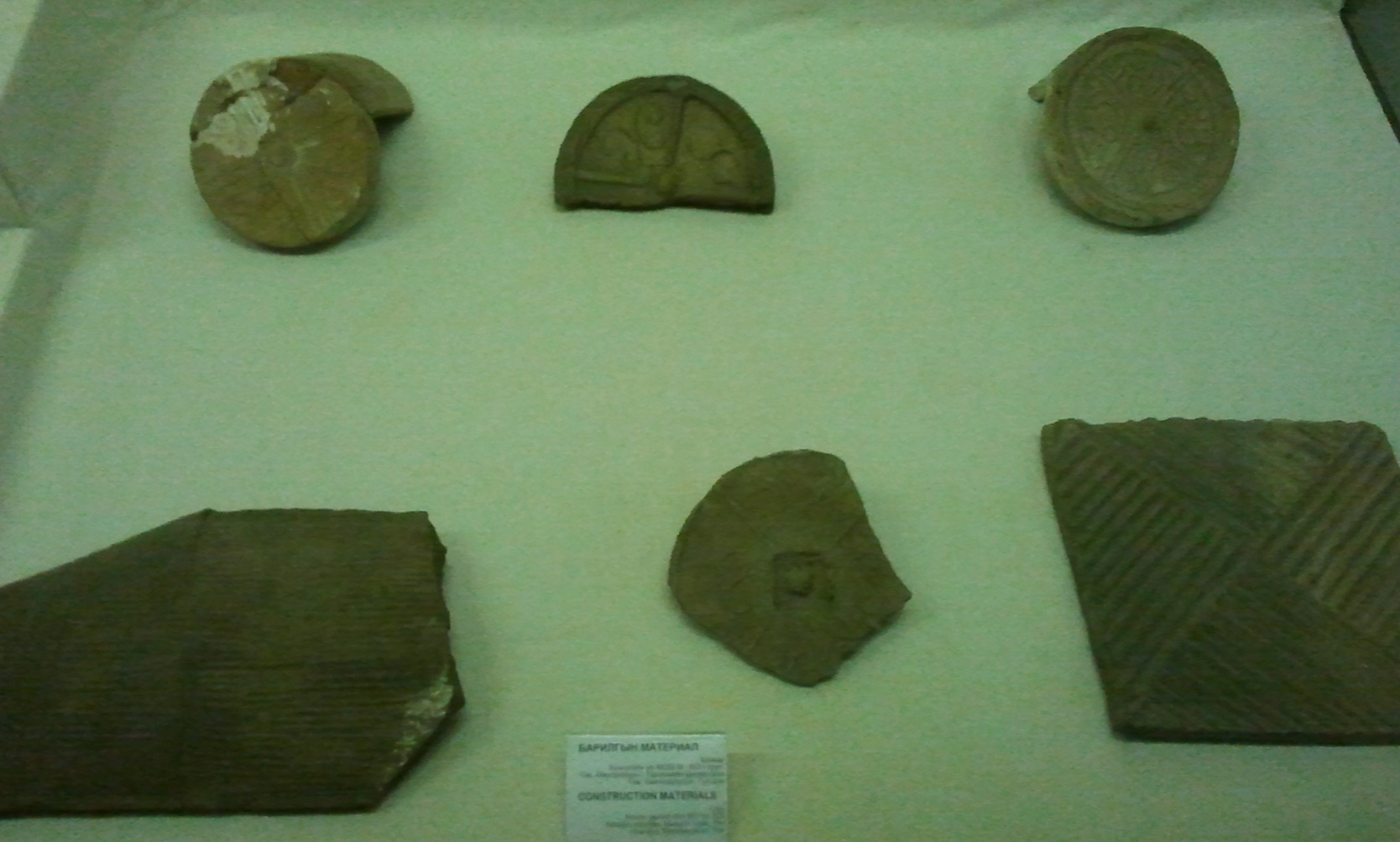
Construction materials from Tereljiin Dorvoljin (209BC-93AD) within the sphere of larger Ulaanbaatar.

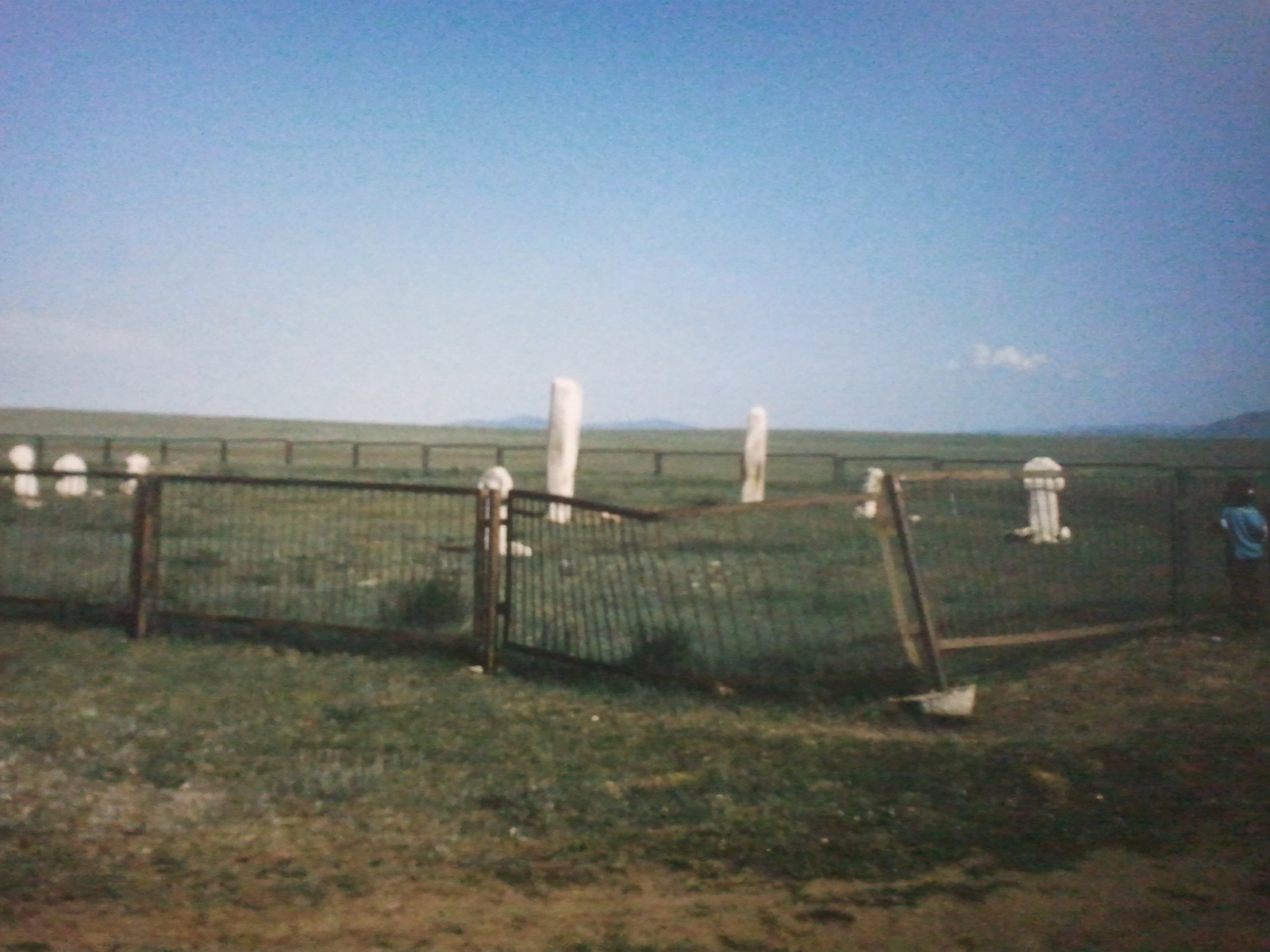
Stele of Tonyukuk (722AD) in Nalaikh District, Ulaanbaatar.

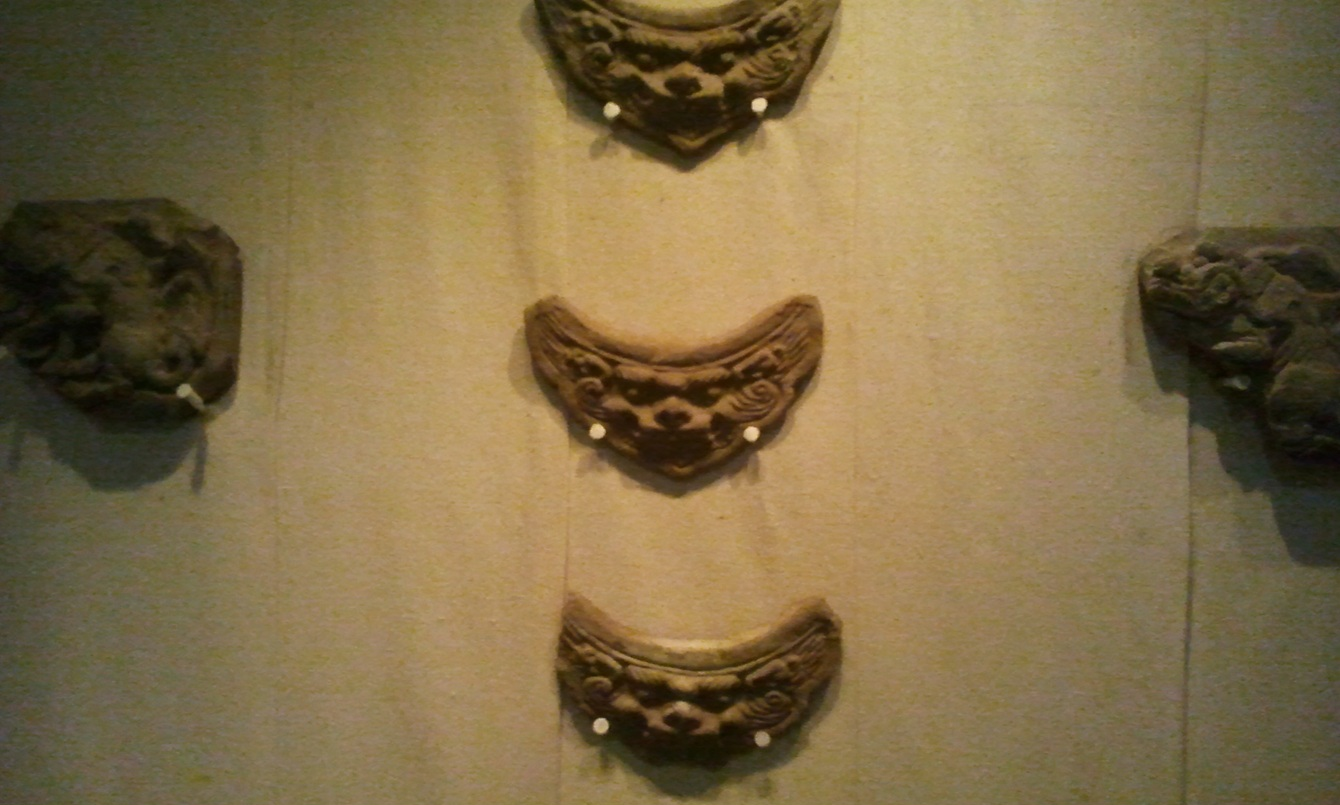
Remains of Wang Khan's 12th-century palace in Ulaanbaatar.

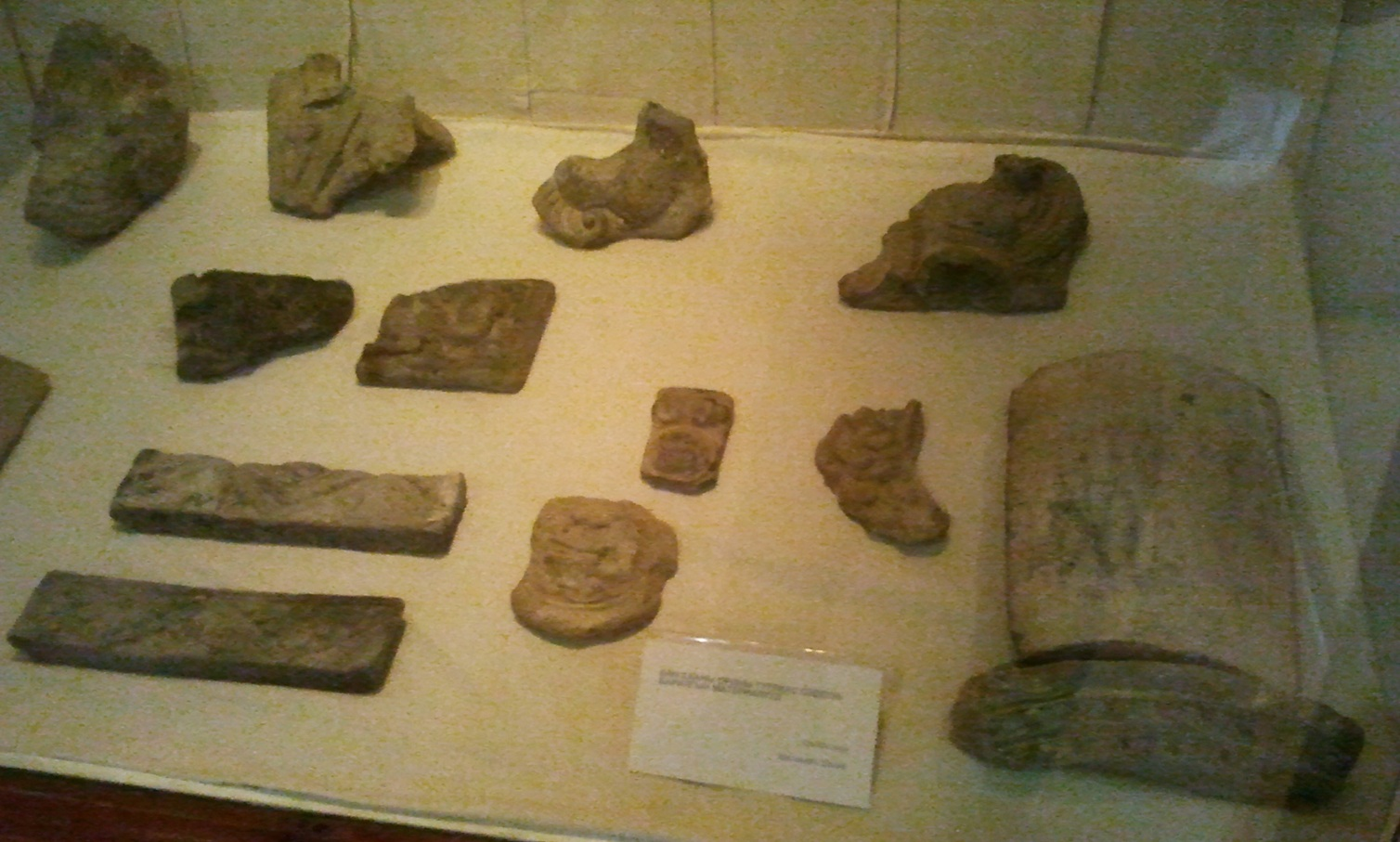
Remains of Wang Khan's 12th-century palace in Ulaanbaatar.

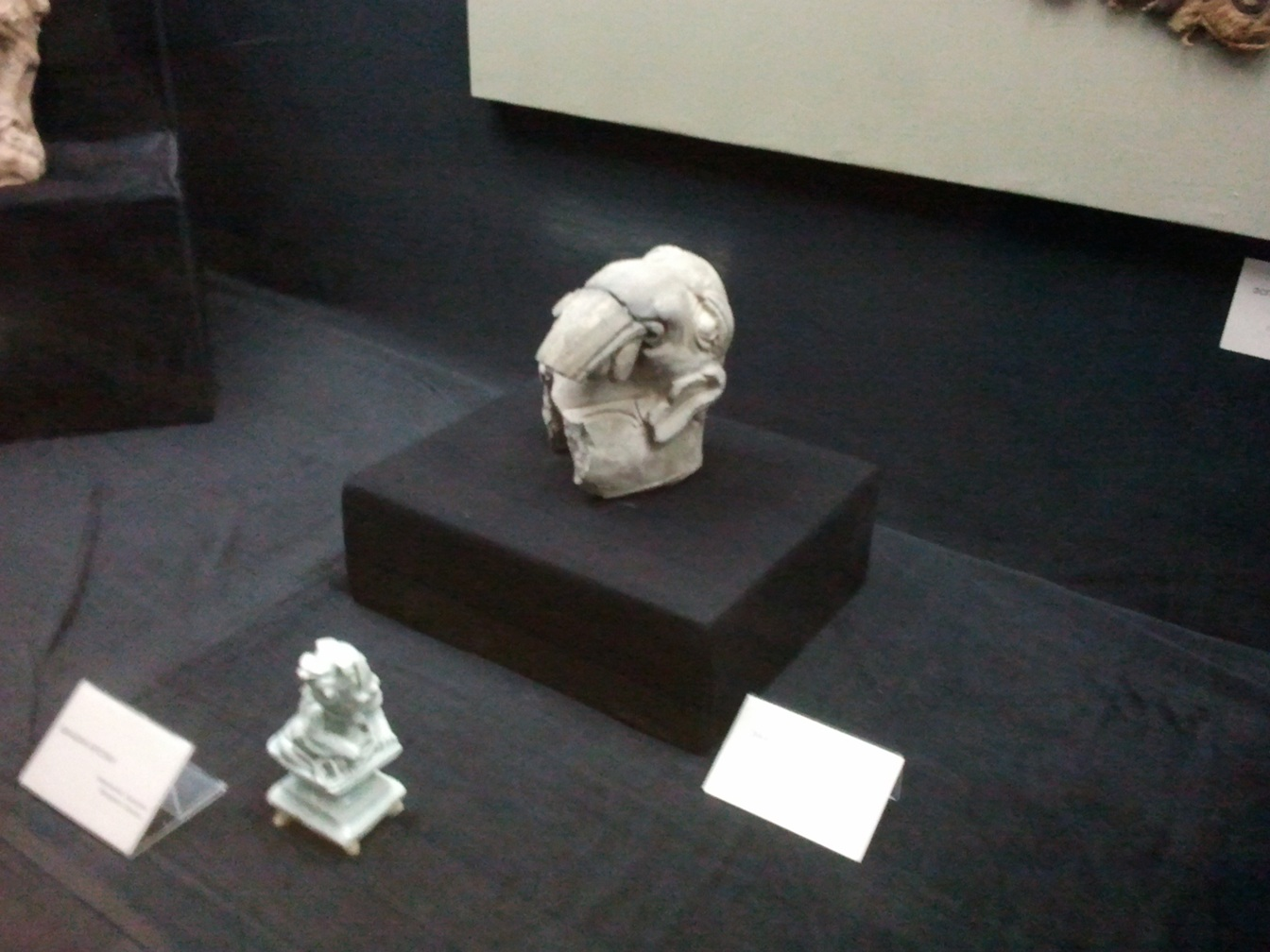
Elephant head from the 13th century ruins of Bukheg Balgas in Ulaanbaatar.

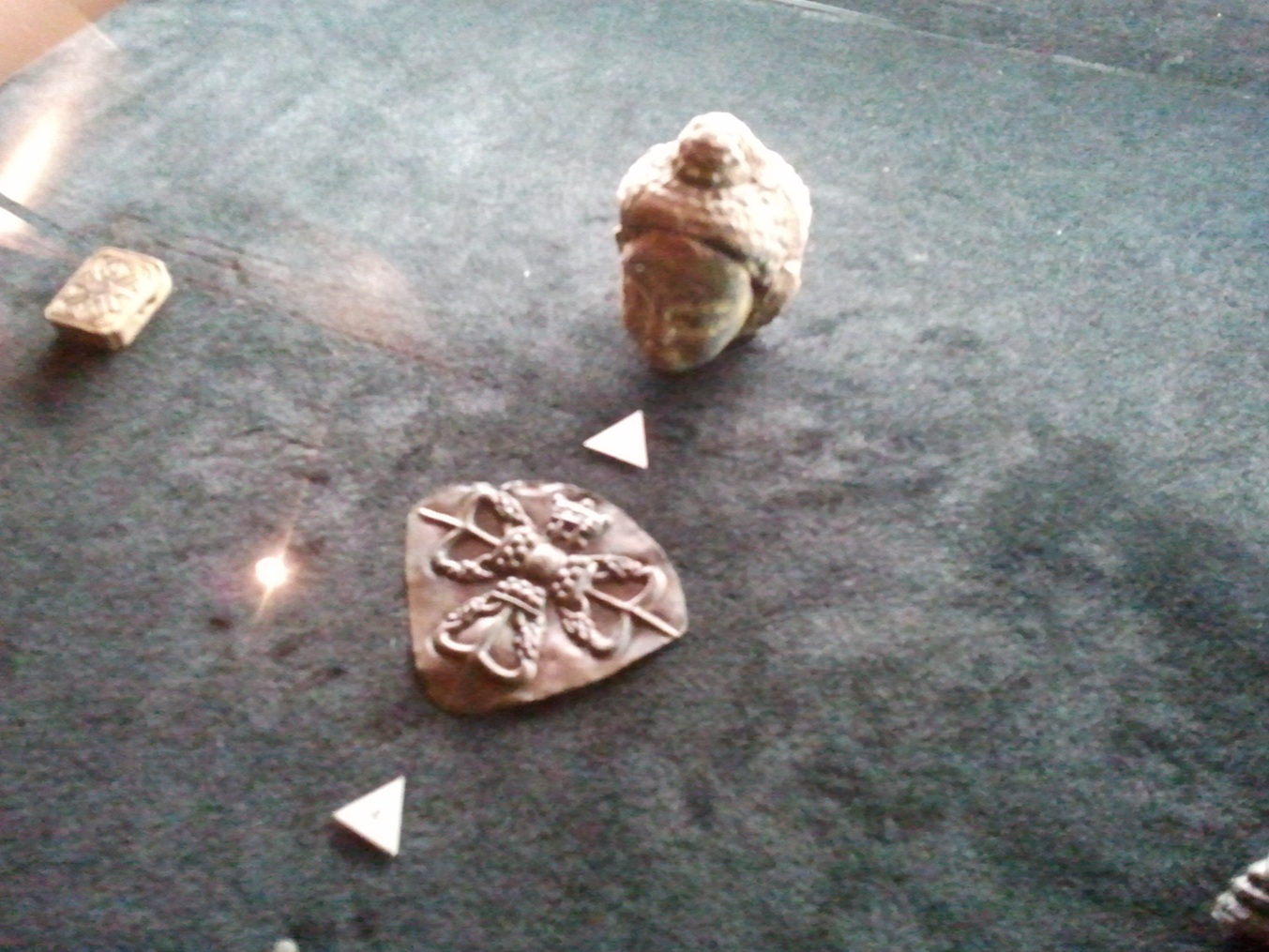
Buddha head from the 13th century ruins of Bukheg Balgas in Ulaanbaatar.

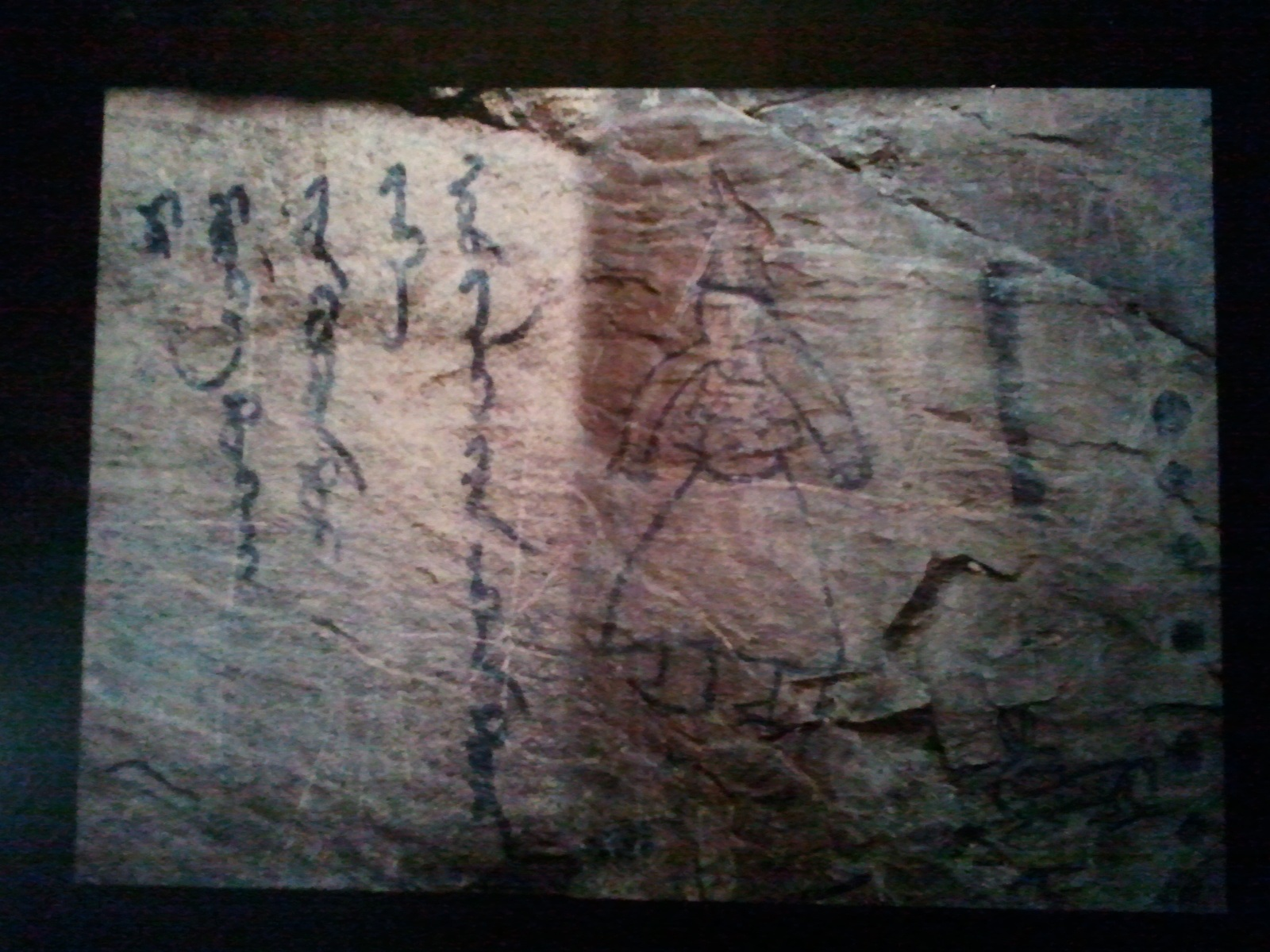
Simple 13th century rock painting of a Mongolian woman in southern Ulaanbaatar.

== Mobile monastery ==
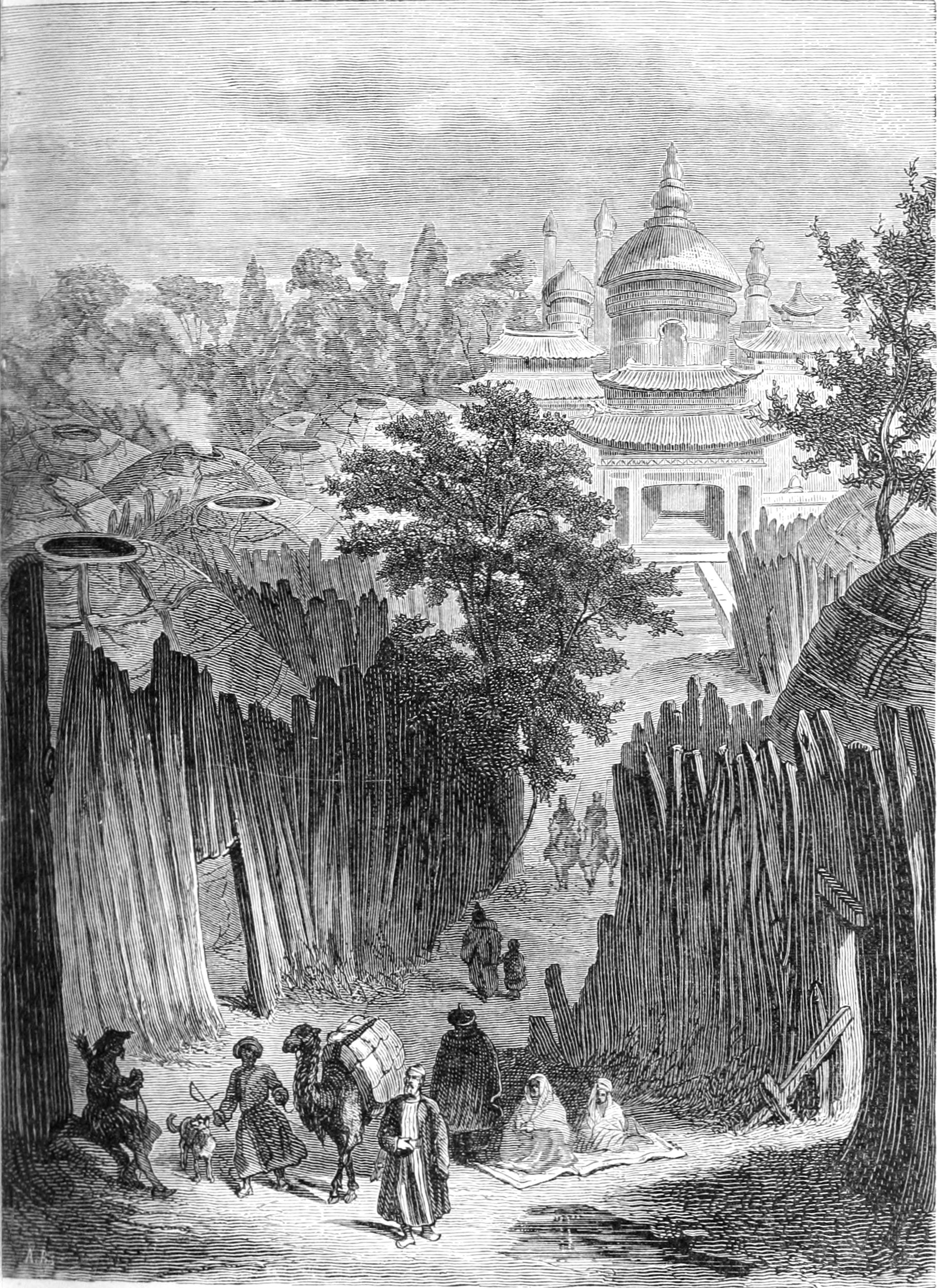
A street sketch of Khüree, 1876, with the temple in the distance.

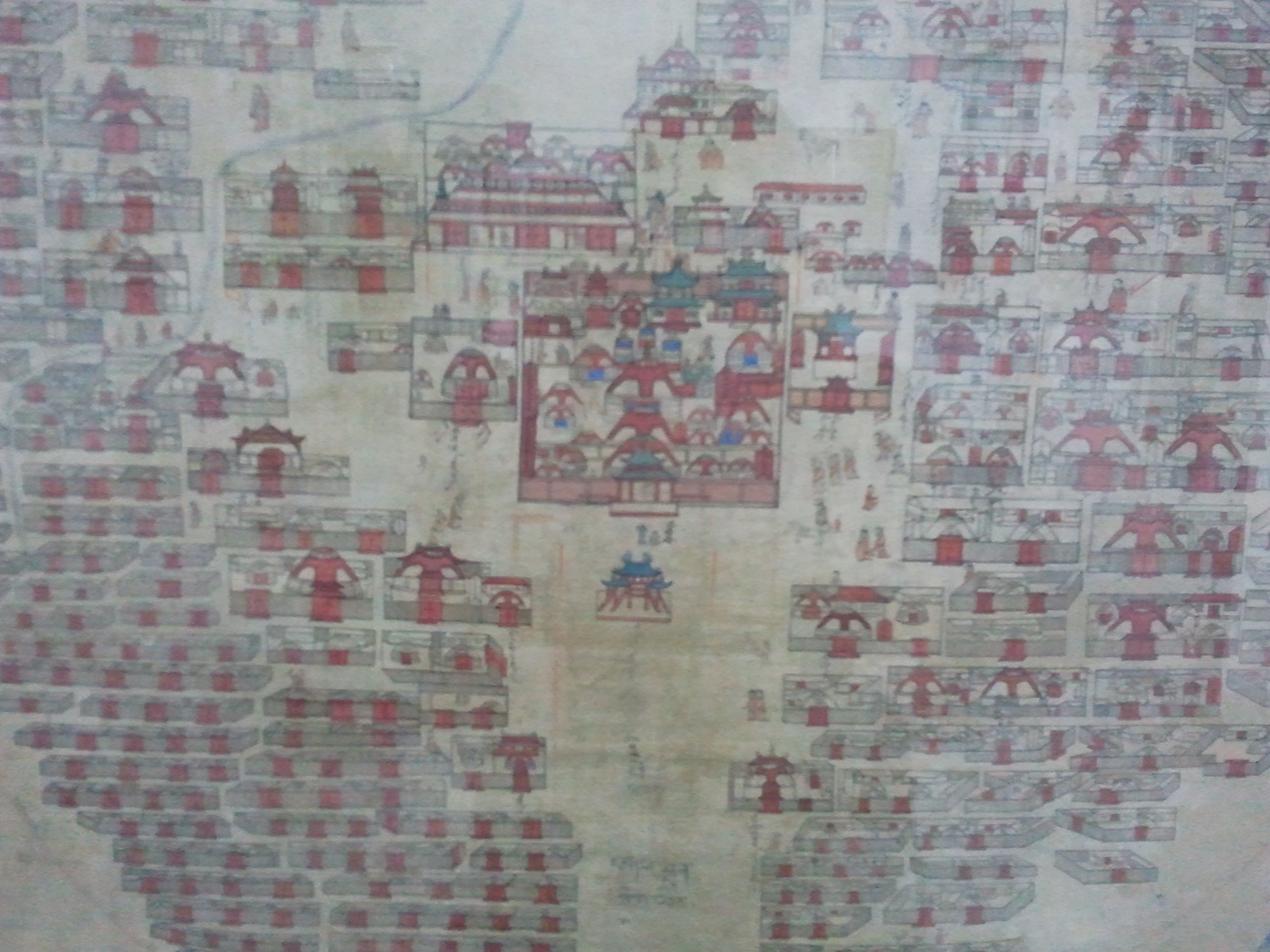
Detail of 19th-century painting of Urga (Ulaanbaatar).

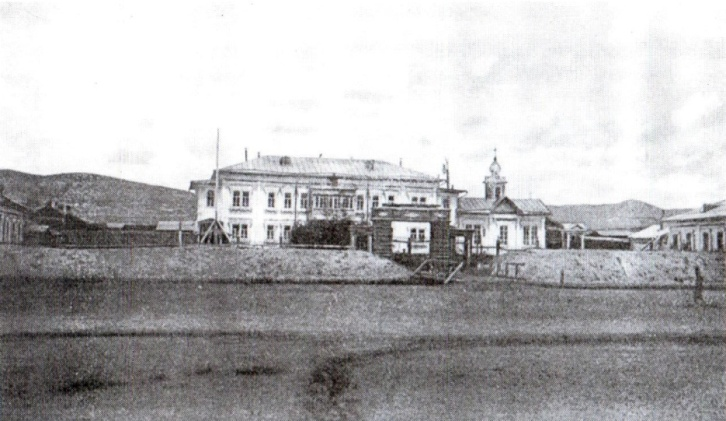
The Russian Consulate of Urga (Ulaanbaatar) and the Holy Trinity Church, both built in 1863.

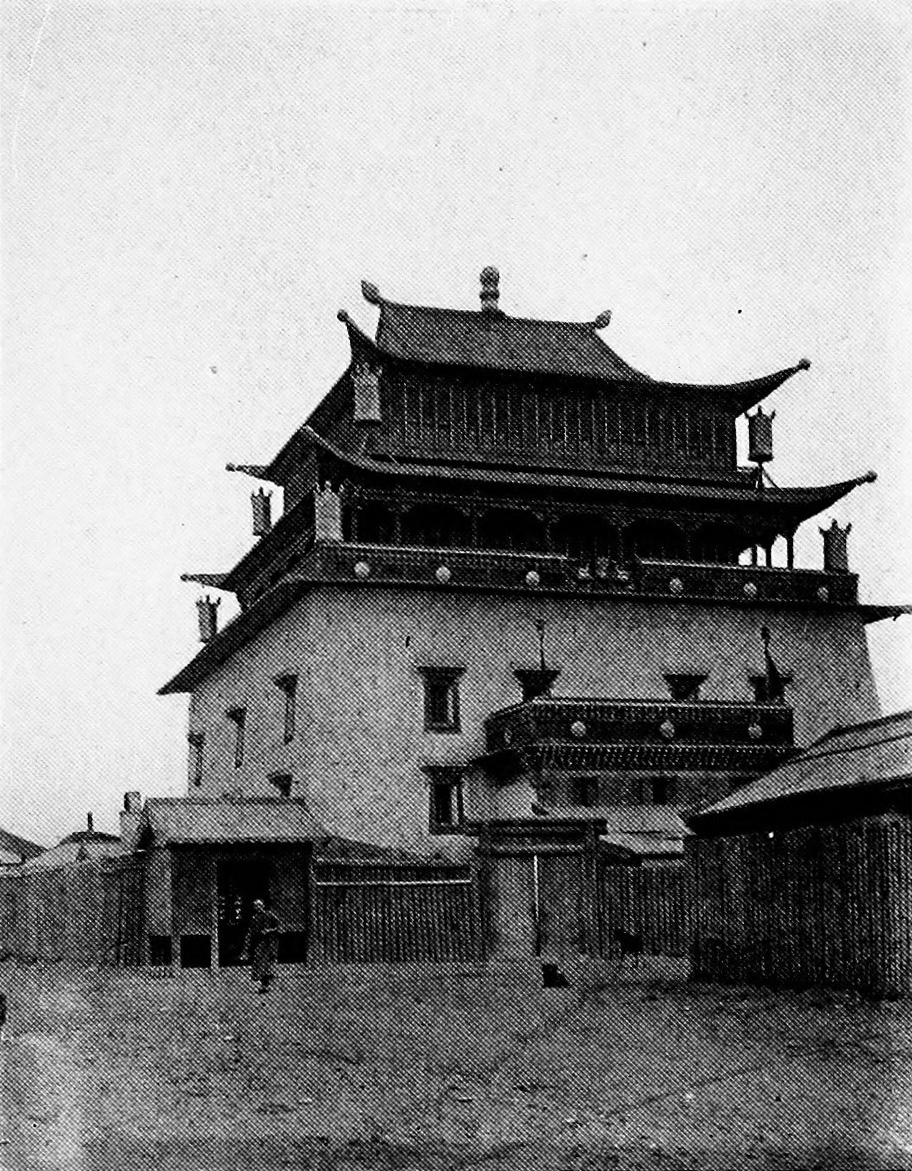
Gandantegchinlen Monastery of Urga in 1920.

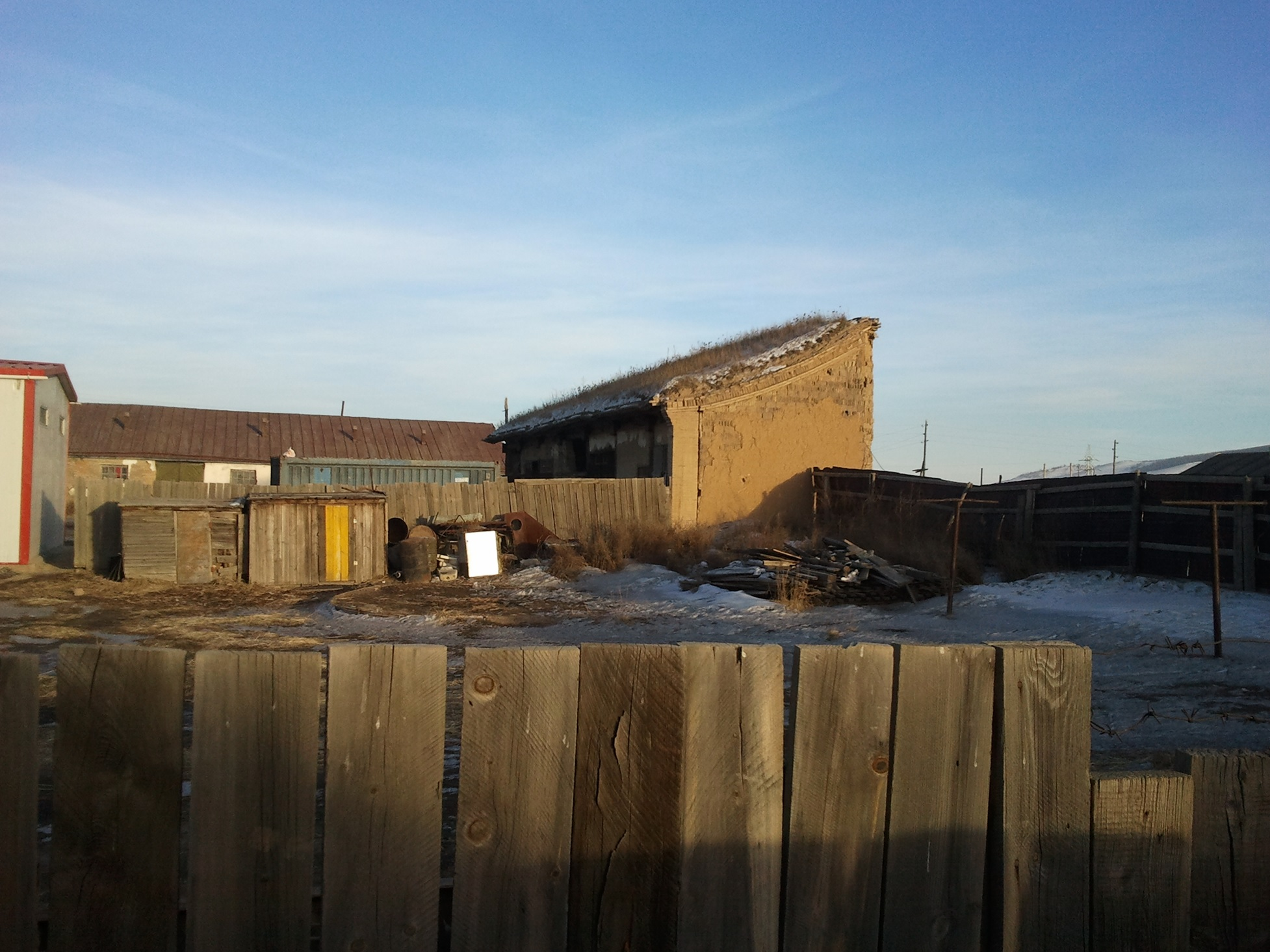
Ruins of a shop (once part of a long row) in the center of the old Maimaicheng district.

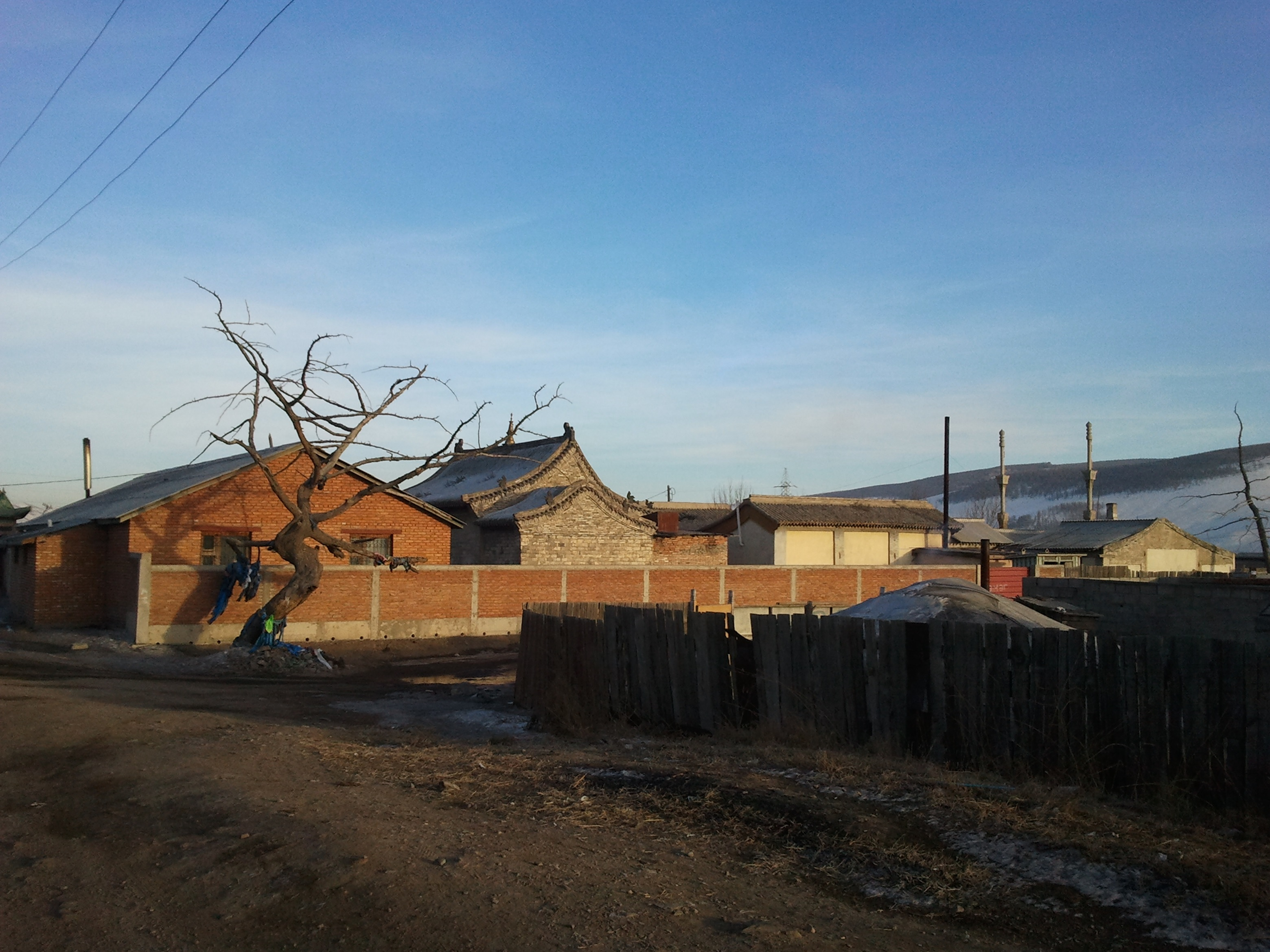
Remaining buildings of the Dari Ekh Temple (1778) in the old Maimaicheng district.

Founded in 1639 as a yurt monastery, Ulaanbaatar, then Örgöö (palace-yurt), was first located at Lake Shireet Tsagaan nuur (75 km directly east of the imperial capital Karakorum) in what is now Burd sum, Övörkhangai, around 230 kilometres (143 miles) south-west from the present site of Ulaanbaatar, and was intended by the Mongol nobles to be the seat of the first Jebtsundamba Khutughtu, Zanabazar, son of Tusheet Khan Gombodorj (1597-1655). Gombodorj was the grandson of Abtai Sain Khan (1554-1588) the grandson of Gersenz Jalair Huangtaizi (1513-1549) the youngest son of Dayan Khan (1464-1517/1543?) the 29th Great Khan and descendant of Kublai Khan (1215-1294). Zanabazar (1635-1723), known as a child prodigy able to recite the Jambaltsanjod (praise of Manjusri) at age three, was enstated in Urga in 1639. His Urga (palatial residence) was known as the Shira Busiin Ord (Yellow Screen Palace). There he was proclaimer "teacher of multitudes", ordained by high lama Wensa Brulgu Luvsandanzanjamts and received the name Luvsandambiijaltsan (Blo-bzang-bstan-pa'i-rgyal-mtshan). In 1651 Zanabazar returned to Mongolia from Tibet and founded seven aimags (monastic departments) in Urga. They were the Department of the Treasury, Department of Administration, Department of Meals, Department of the Honored Doctor, Department of Amdo, Department of Orlog and the Department of Khuukhen Noyon. In his old age he established four more monastic departments in Urga.

As a mobile monastery-town, it was often moved to various places along the Selenge, Orkhon and Tuul rivers, as supply and other needs would demand. During the Dzungar wars of the late 17th century, it was even moved to Inner Mongolia. As the city grew, it moved less and less. The movements of the city can be detailed as following: Shireet Tsagaan Nuur (1639), Khoshoo Tsaidam (1640), Khentii Mountains (1654), Ogoomor (1688), Inner Mongolia (1690), Tsetserlegiin Erdene Tolgoi (1700), Daagandel (1719), Usan Seer (1720), Ikh Tamir (1722), Jargalant (1723), Eeven Gol (1724), Khujirtbulan (1729), Burgaltai (1730), Sognogor (1732), Terelj (1733), Uliastai River (1734), Khui Mandal (1736), Khuntsal (1740), Udleg (1742), Ogoomor (1743), Selbe (1747), Uliastai River (1756), Selbe (1762), Khui Mandal (1772), Selbe (1778). In 1778, the city moved from Khui Mandal and settled for good at its current location, near the confluence of the Selbe and Tuul rivers and beneath Bogd Khan Uul, back then also on the caravan route from Beijing to Kyakhta. One of the earliest Western mentions of Urga is the account of the Scottish traveller John Bell in 1721:

What they call the Urga is the court, or the place where the prince (Tusheet Khan) and high priest (Bogd Jebtsundamba Khutugtu) reside, who are always encamped at no great distance from one another. They have several thousand tents about them, which are removed from time to time. The Urga is much frequented by merchants from China and Russia, and other places.

Another early mention is in the Journal of Swedish explorer Lorenz Lange in 1722:

In regard to our commerce with China, it is, at present, in a very languishing condition; and nothing in the world would bring more prejudice to our caravans, than the commerce which is carried on at Urga; for from this place is brought, monthly, even weekly, to Pekin, not only the same sorts of goods which our caravans bring, but of a better quality than those brought by our caravans; and in so great quantities, that the merchandises which the merchants of Pekin, who go continually between Pekin and Urga to trade with our people, and the goods which the lamas of the Mongols bring from their parts, amount every year to four or five times as much value as the caravans that come to Pekin in the name of his Czarish Majesty.

By the time of Zanabazar's death in 1723 Urga had already become the preeminent monastery in Mongolia in terms of religious authority. A council of seven of the highest ranking lamas (Khamba Nomon Khan, Ded Khamba and five Tsorj) made most of the religious decisions in the city. It had also become the commercial center of Outer Mongolia. From 1733 till 1778 Urga basically moved around in the vicinity of its present location. In 1754 the Erdene Shanzodba Yam (Administration of Ecclesiastical Estate) of Urga was given full authority to supervise the administrative affairs of the shabinar (lay subjects of the Bogd). It also functioned and would continue to function as the chief judicial court of the city. Sunduvdorj was the Erdene Shanzodba at this time. In 1758 the Qianlong Emperor appointed the Khalkha Vice General Sanzaidorj as the first Mongol amban of Urga with full authority to "oversee the Khuree and administer well all the Khutugtu's shabinar". In 1761 a second amban was appointed for the same purpose, a Manchu one. In 1786 a decree was issued in Peking which gave right to the Urga ambans to make final decisions concerning the administrative affairs of Tusheet Khan and Setsen Khan territories. With this, Urga became the highest civil authority in the country. Based on Urga's Mongol governor Sanzaidorj's petition the Qianlong Emperor officially recognized an annual ceremony on Mt. Bogd Khan Uul in 1778 and provided the annual imperial donations. The city was the seat not only of the Jebtsundamba Khutugtus, but also of two Qing ambans, and a Chinese trade town grew "four trees" or 4.24 km (2.63 mi) east of the city center at the confluence of the Uliastai and Tuul rivers. This trade district was kept at a distance in order not to block the way of pilgrims or defile the holy city (as demanded by the 4th Bogd Jebtsundamba). It had agricultural fields and artificial lakes. The Chinese had large, beautifully decorated shops selling different articles. A pair of highly ornate 11-metre-tall (36 ft) inscribed columns (1783) standing in front of the surviving Dari Ekh Temple (1778) in the former Maimaicheng district is now under national protection. The large store Nomtiin Puus (Shop of the Pious Merchant) and ruins of another old Chinese shop are still visible. There were 14 temples in Maimaicheng: 8 Chinese and 6 Mongolian, including the Kunz Bogdiin Sum (Confucius Temple), Odon Sum (Astrological Temple), Tsagaan Malgaitiin Sum (White Hat Mosque of Chinese Muslims), Dari Ehiin Sum (Guanyin Temple), Geser Sum (Guandi Temple), Erleg Khaani Sum (Temple of the Lord of Death), Erliiziin Sum (Temple of the Mixed-Ethnicity People) and Urchuudiin Sum (Temple of Craftsmen). A Zargachiin Yam (Chamber of Judges) located east of the Chinese mosque handled legal affairs of the Chinese.

Since 1778 Urga may have had around 10,000 monks. They were regulated by a monastic rule called the Internal Rule of the Grand Monastery or Yeke Kuriyen-u Doto'adu Durem (for example, in 1797 a decree of the 4th Jebtsundamba forbade "singing, playing with archery, myagman, chess, usury and smoking"). Executions were forbidden where the holy temples of the Bogd Jebtsundama could be seen, so capital punishment was carried out a certain distance away from the city. In 1839 the 5th Bogd Jebtsundamba moved his residence to Gandan Hill, an elevated position to the west of the Baruun Damnuurchin markets. A part of the city was moved to nearby Tolgoit. The reason given for this move was that prevailing north-western winds brought the impure air of the Baruun Damnuurchin markets (known for its many Chinese and Russian shops as well as brothels) onto the inviolably sacred area of the Bogd Jebtsundamba's Zuun Khuree temple complex, located just to the east of the markets. Despite this, in 1855 the part of the camp that moved to Tolgoit was brought back to its 1778 location and the 7th Bogd Jebtsundamba moved back to the Zuun Khuree permanently. The Gandan Monastery flourished as a center of philosophical studies (tsanid). Women were not allowed to enter the area and its Yellow Hat monks were forbidden to go to the lay quarters (khoroo) where Red Hat sect monks freely took wives. Urga was visited by many foreign envoys and travelers, including Egor Fedorovich Timkovskii (1820), N.M.Przhevalsky, Pyotr Kozlov, M. De Bourbolon (1860) and A.M. Pozdneev. The Russian embassy of 130 persons which arrived in Urga in January 1806 included Count Yury Golovkin, Count Jan Potocki, Julius Klaproth and Andrey Yefimovich Martynov. In 1863 the Russian Consulate of Urga was opened in a newly built two-storey building on Consul Hill. A small onion-domed Chapel of the Holy Trinity was opened the same year. There were protests from some Urga monks who complained that the Consulate on Consul Hill was higher than the sacred pole of the Bogd Jebtsundamba. Most of the major Mongolian khans and nobles had representative residence quarters in Urga located in the south-east and south-west khoroo lay quarters which they occasionally visited. The south-west lay quarters also included the Tibetan and Buryat quarters and had a number of Red Hat temples, shamanic shrines as well as Yellow Hat temples. The quarters (Amban Khan Khoroo) of the Mongol and Manchu governors of Urga were located in the Zuun Omnod Khoroo (Southeast Khoroo) lay quarters.

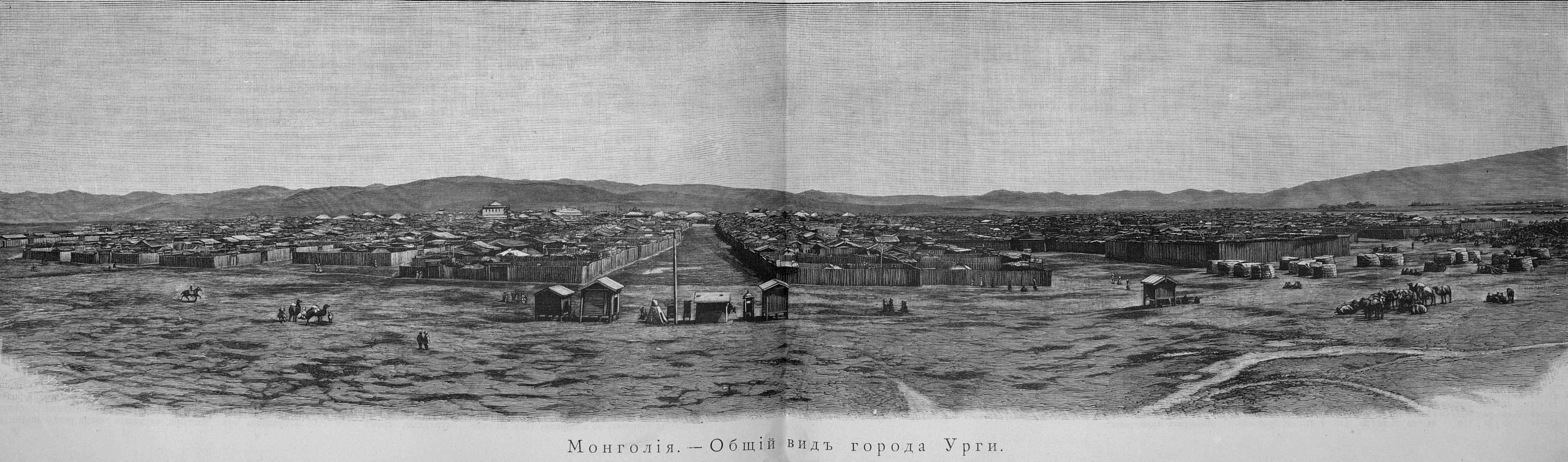
Engraving of N.A. Charushin's panorama photo of the old center of Urga from trip (1888) with Potanin

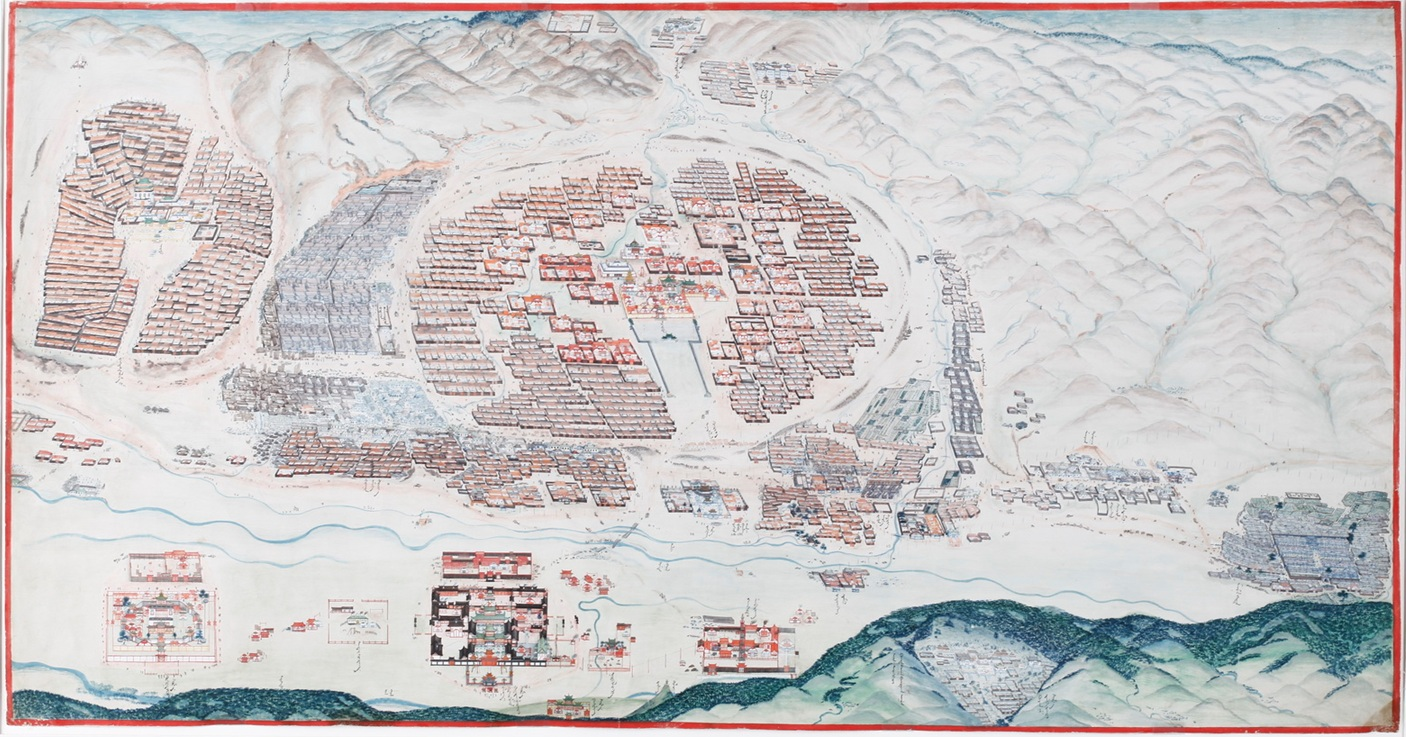
A 1913 panorama of Urga. The large circular compound in the middle is the Zuun Khuree temple-palace complex. The Gandan temple complex is to the left. The palaces of the Bogd are to the south of the river. To the far bottom right of the painting is the Maimaicheng district. To its left are the white buildings of the Russian consulate area. The Manjusri monastery can be seen on Mount Bogd Khan Uul at the bottom-right of the painting

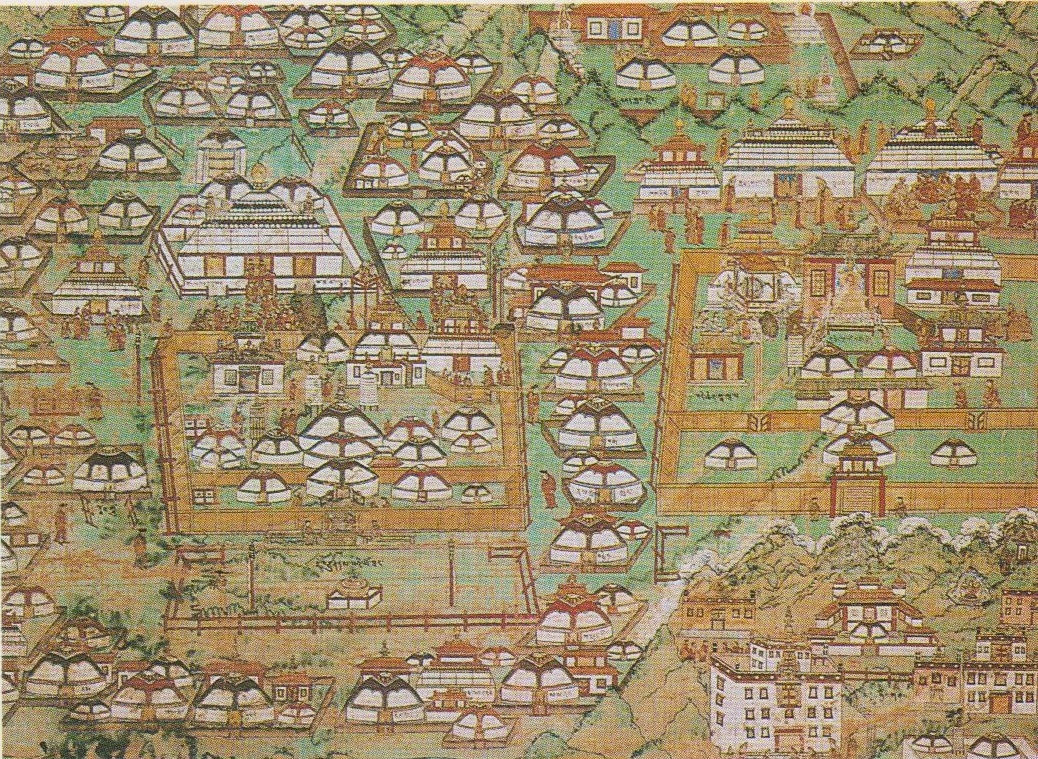
Painting of Urga showing Gandan and Zuun Khuree. Dates to 1809-1833 (between founding of Gandan and construction of the Maidar temple).

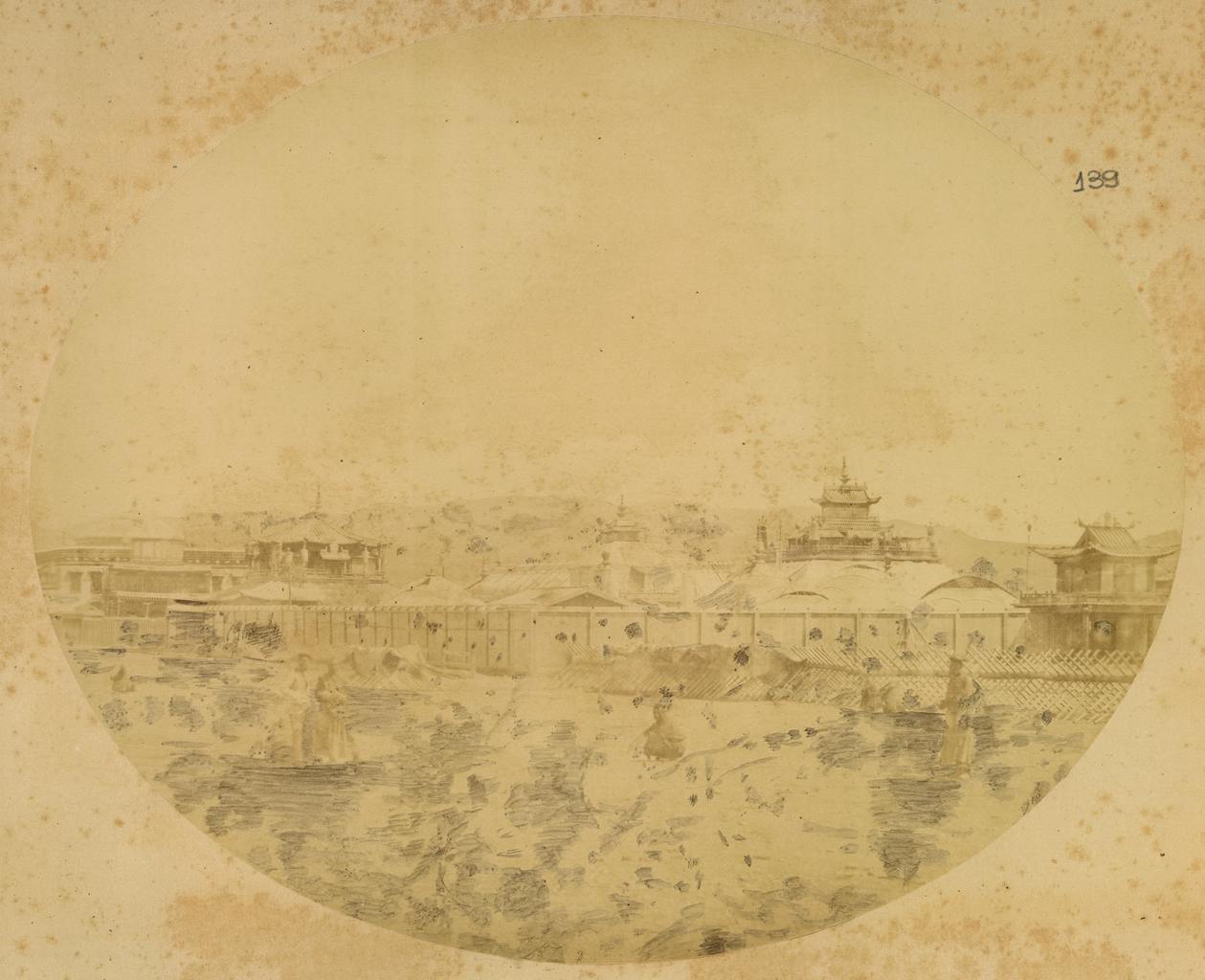
1874 photo of the Dechingalav, Maidar, Bat Tsagaan and Abtai Khan temples in central Urga.

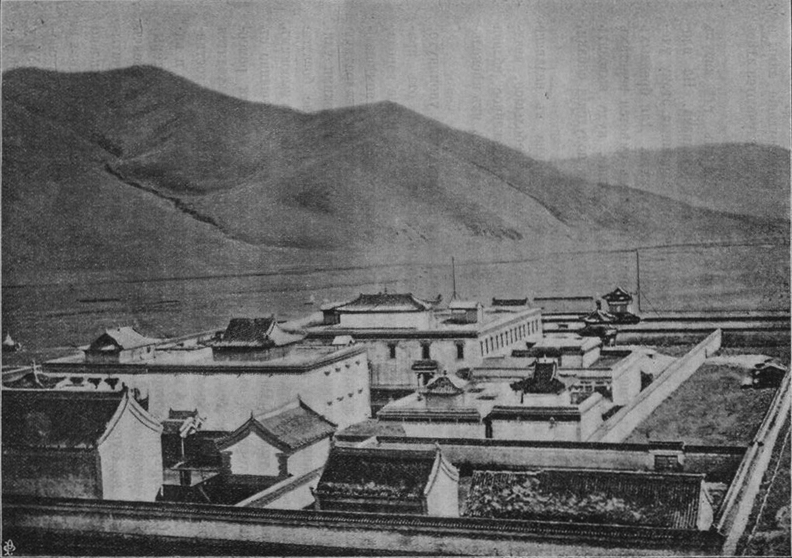
Temples of Urga in 1900.

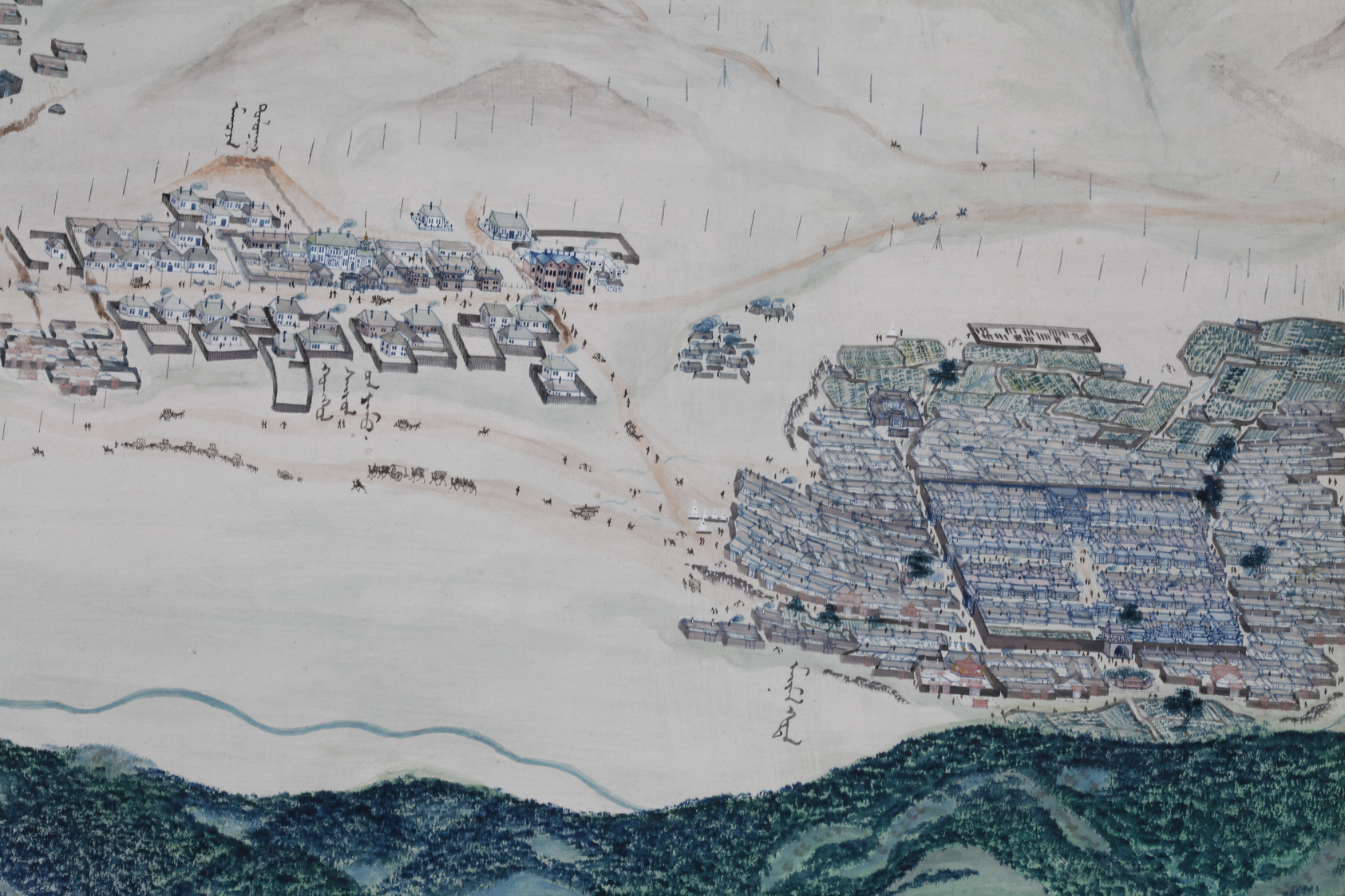
Detail of the Maimaicheng and Russian consulate in Jugder's 1913 painting.

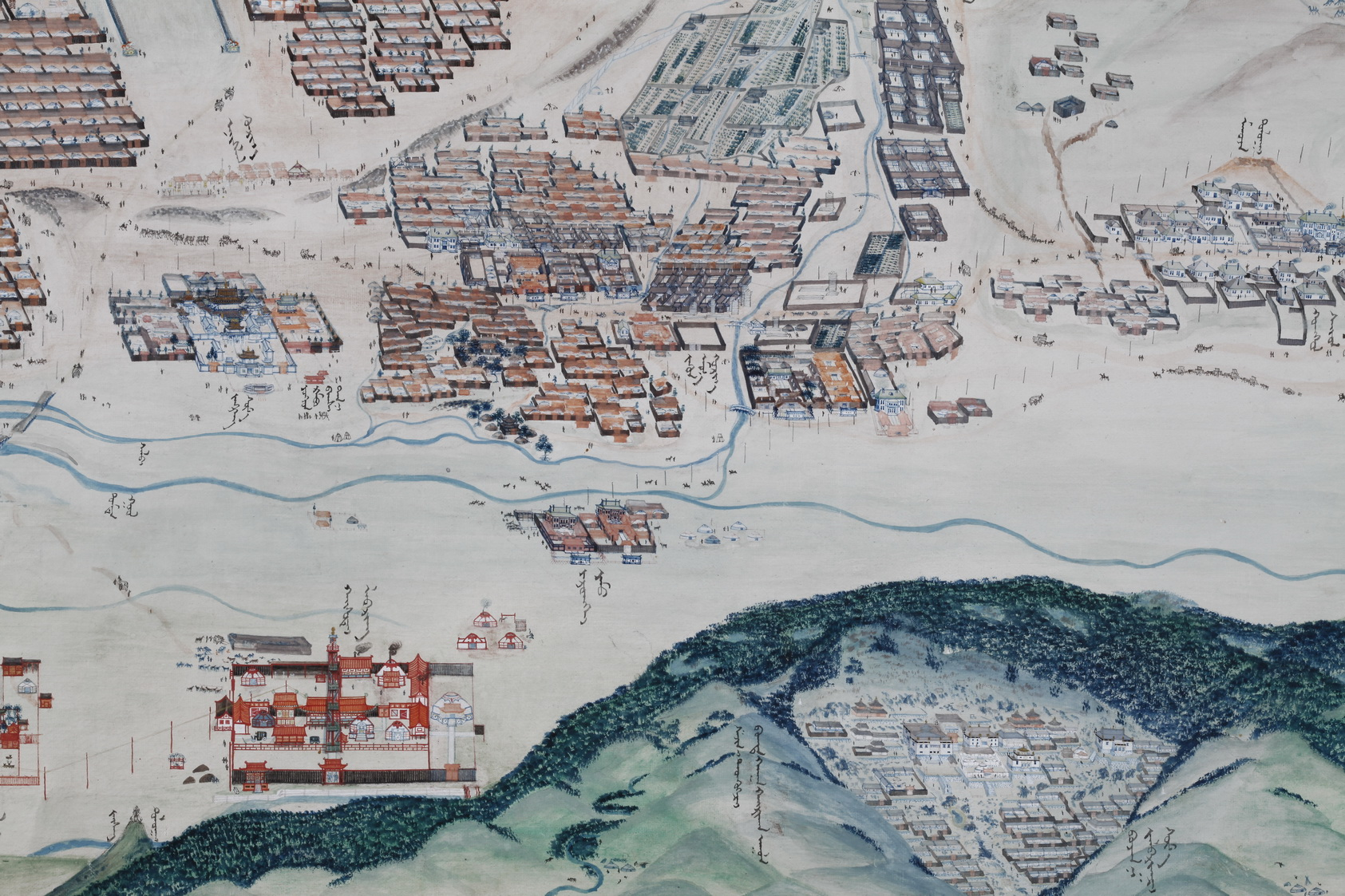
Detail of the South-East Lay Quarters and surrounding areas in Jugder's 1913 painting.

Detail of Manjusri monastery on Mount Bogd Khan Uul in Jugder's 1913 painting.

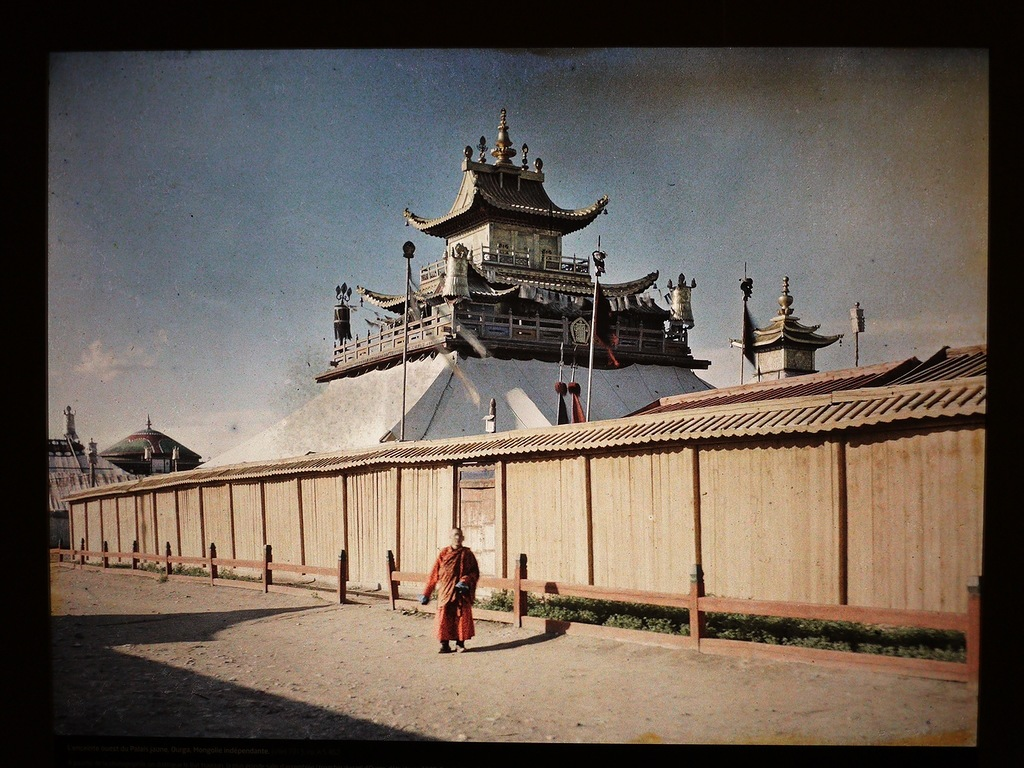
1913 color photo of the Yellow Palace with Dechingalav temple (1739). To its right is the smaller golden roof of the Abtai Khan ger temple (1585). To the left is the Maidar temple (1833) and edge of the big Bat Tsagaan temple (1654).

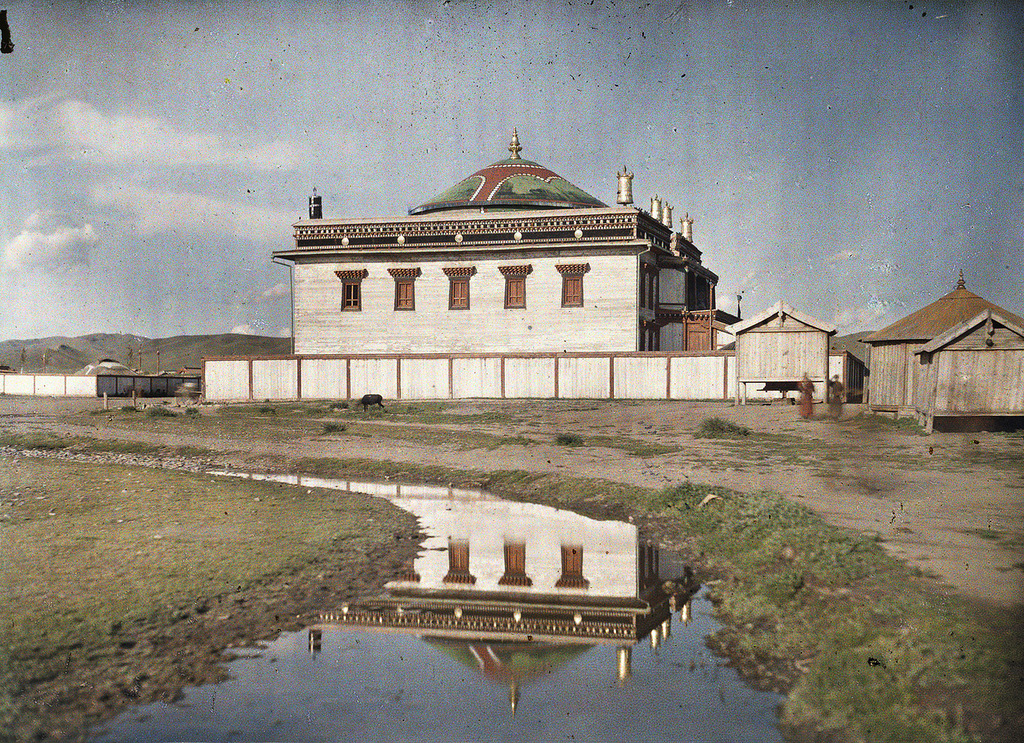
Maidar Temple (1833) of Zuun Khuree in Urga photographed in 1913.

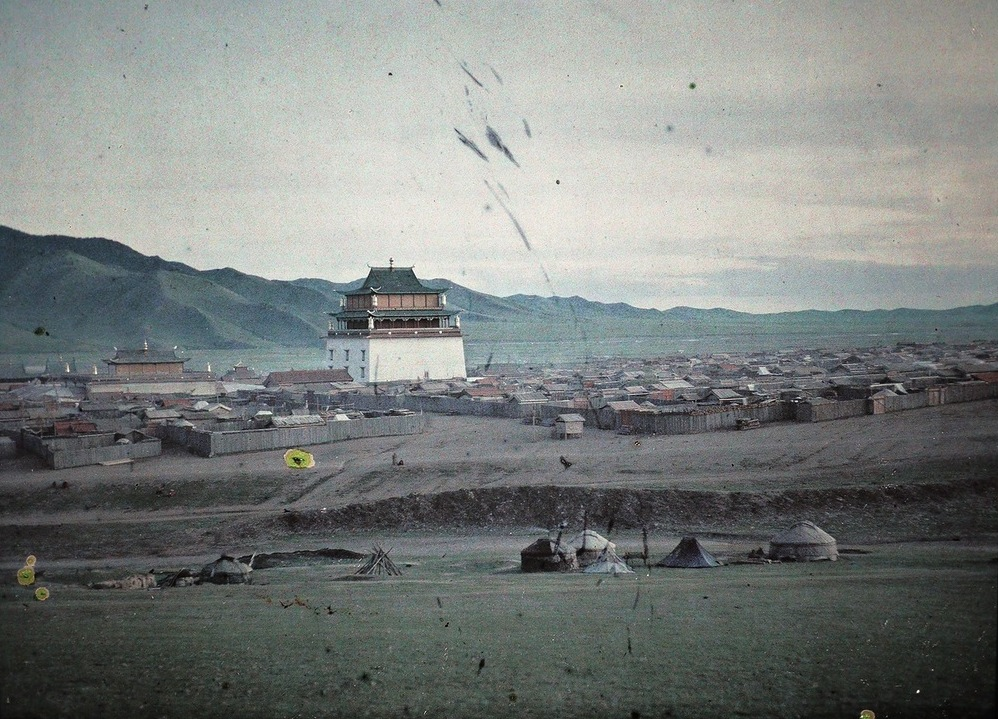
1913 color photo of Gandan Monastery.

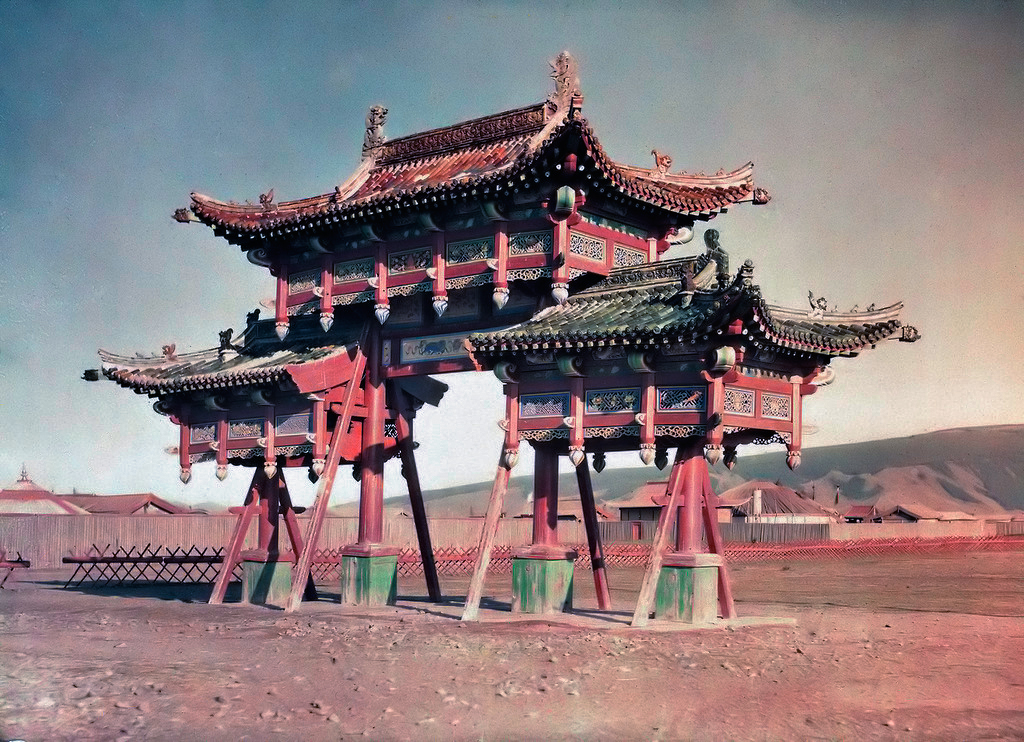
1913 color photo of the ceremonial Gate of Zuun Khuree.

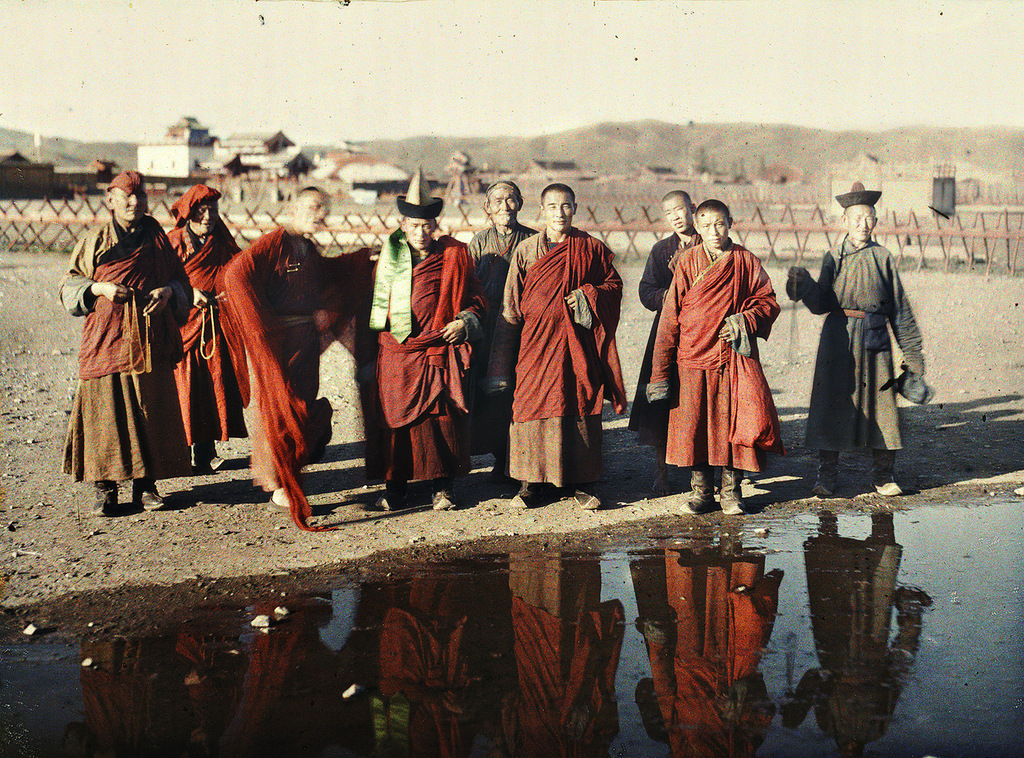
1913 color photo of Mongol Lamas of Zuun Khuree wearing Buddhist robes/togas.

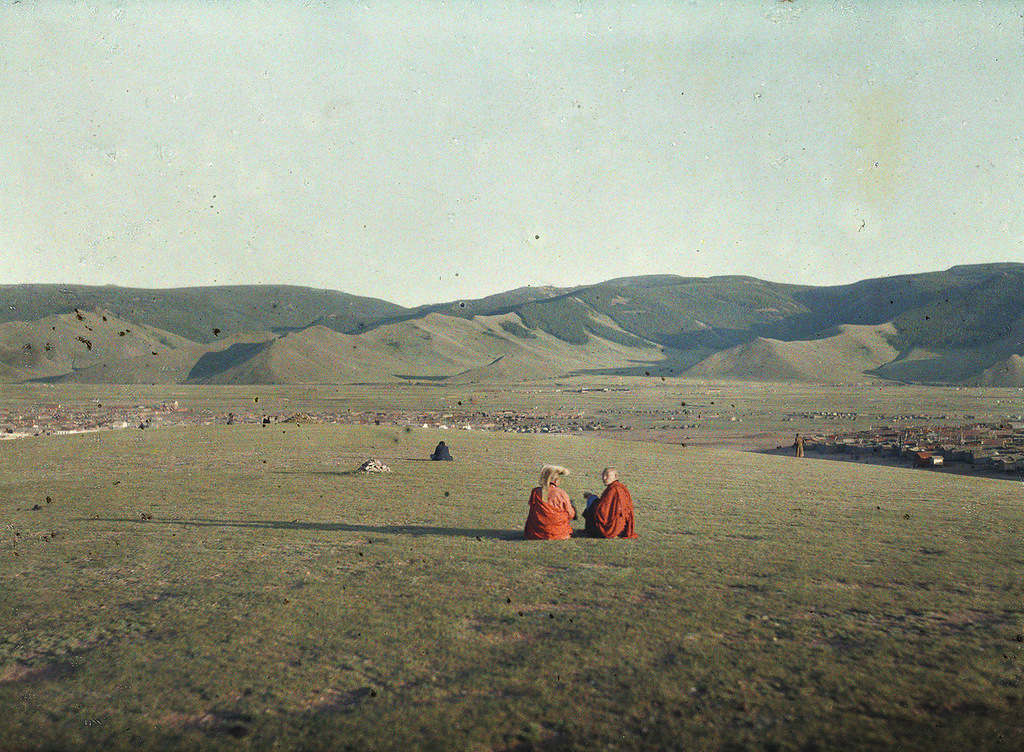
1913 photo of monks on Tasgan Hill facing the city to the south.

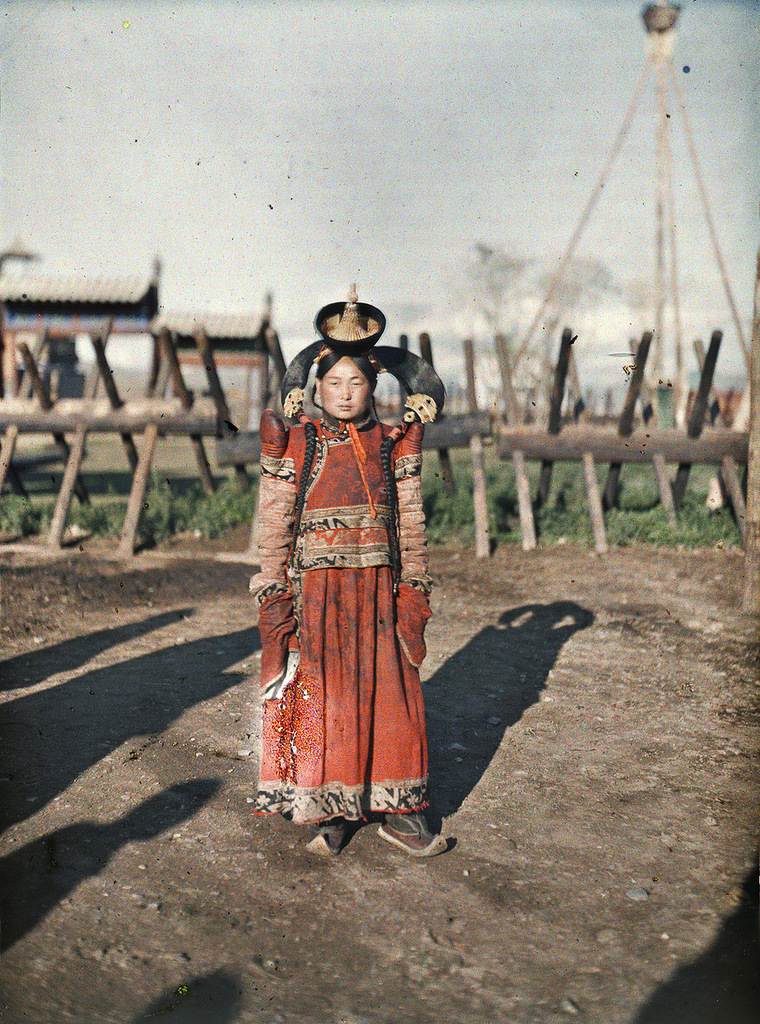
1913 photo of Mongol woman next to the Khais (hedge fence) of Zuun Khuree.

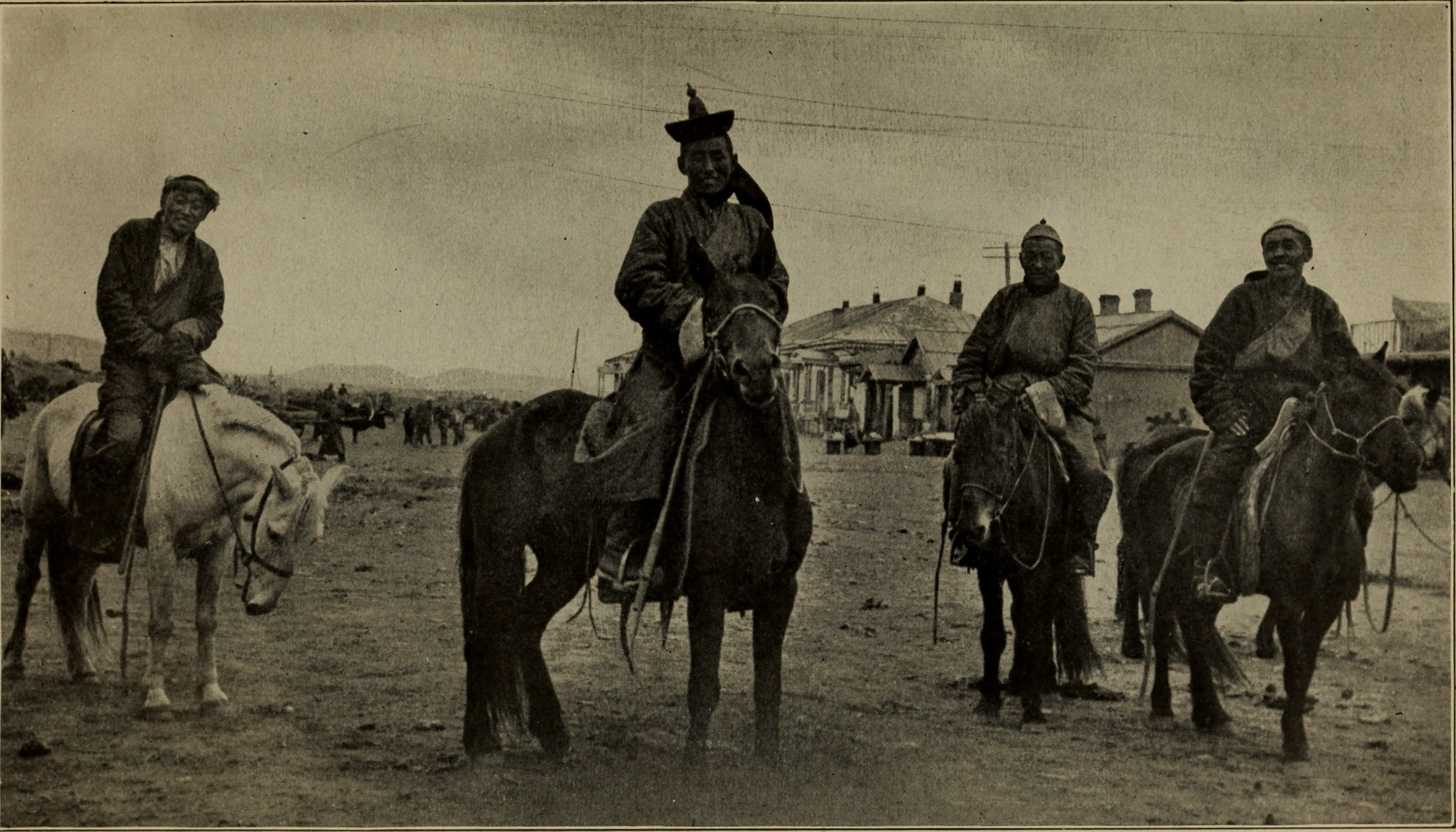
Mongol horsemen on the streets of Urga in 1920.

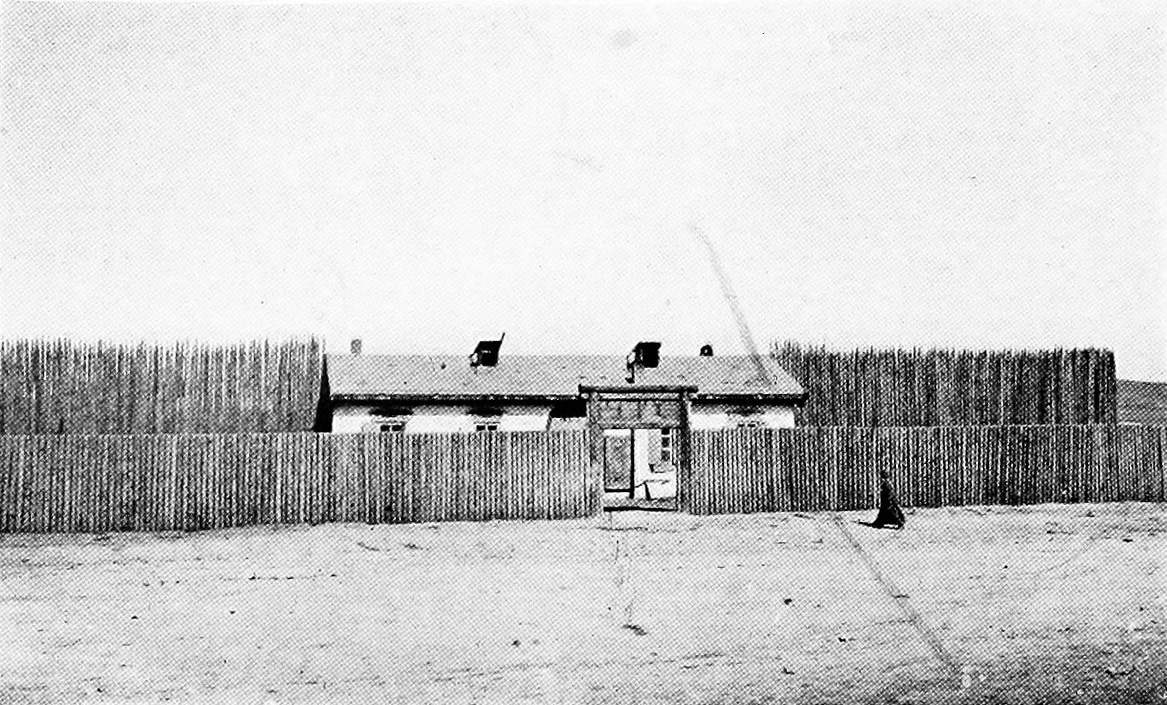
The prison at Urga in 1920.

== Urga and the Kyakhta Trade ==
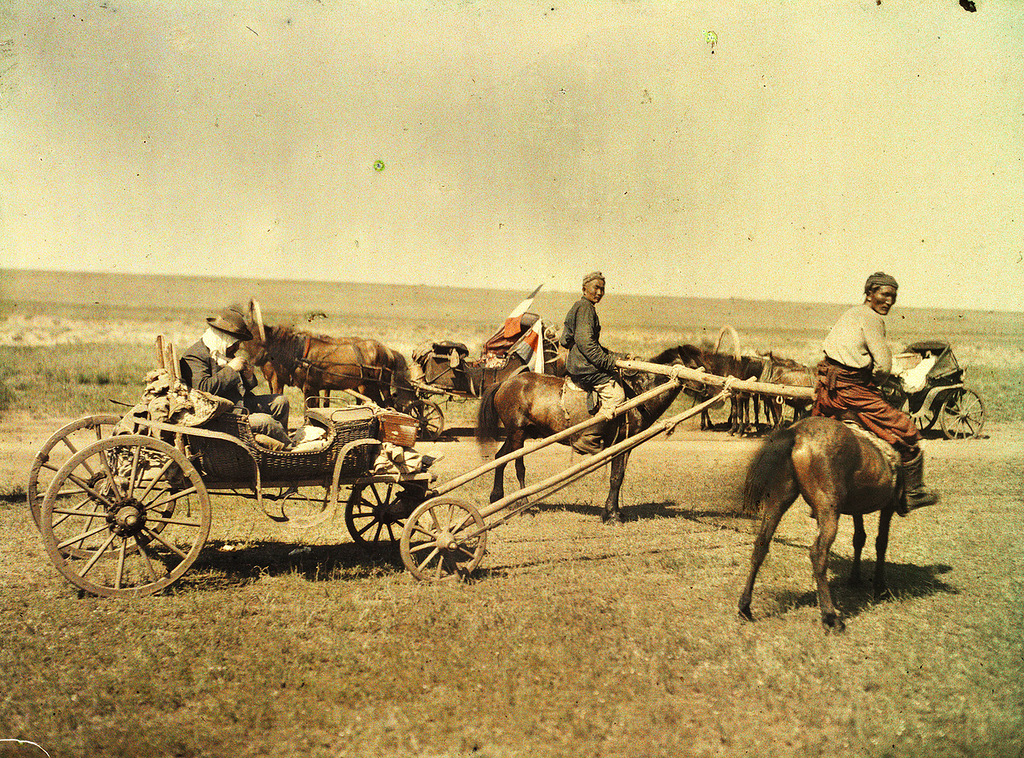
Four-wheeled carriage between Kykhta and Khuree

Following the Treaty of Kyakhta in 1727 Urga (Ulaanbaatar) was a major point of the Kyakhta trade between Russia and China - mostly Siberian furs for Chinese cloth and later tea. The route ran south to Urga, southeast across the Gobi to Kalgan and southeast over the mountains to Peking. Urga was also a collection point for goods coming from further west. These were either sent to China or shipped north to Russia via Kyakhta because of legal restrictions and the lack of good trade routes to the west.

By 1908 there was a Russian quarter with a few hundred merchants and a Russian club and informal Russian mayor. East of the main town was the Russian consulate built in 1863 with an Orthodox church, post office and 20 Cossack guards. It was fortified in 1900 and briefly occupied by troops during the Boxer Rebellion. There was a telegraph line north to Kyakhta and southeast to Kalgan and weekly postal service along these routes. Beyond the Russian consulate was the Chinese trading post called Maimaicheng and nearby the palace of the Manchu viceroy. With the growth of Western trade at the Chinese ports the tea trade to Russia declined, some Chinese merchants left and wool became the main export. Manufactured goods still came from Russia but most were now brought from Kalgan by caravan. The annual trade was estimated at 25 million rubles, nine tenths in Chinese hands and one tenth Russian.

== Communist era ==
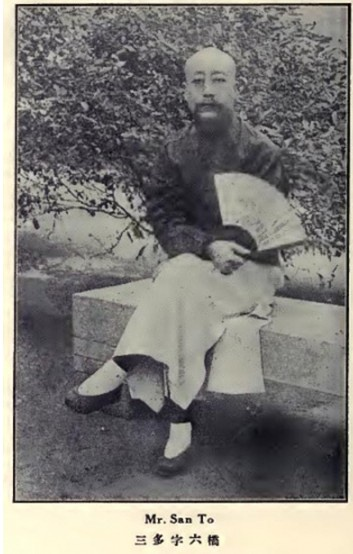
Sanduo (三多), an ethnic Mongol, was the 62nd and last Qing Amban (1910-1911) of Urga

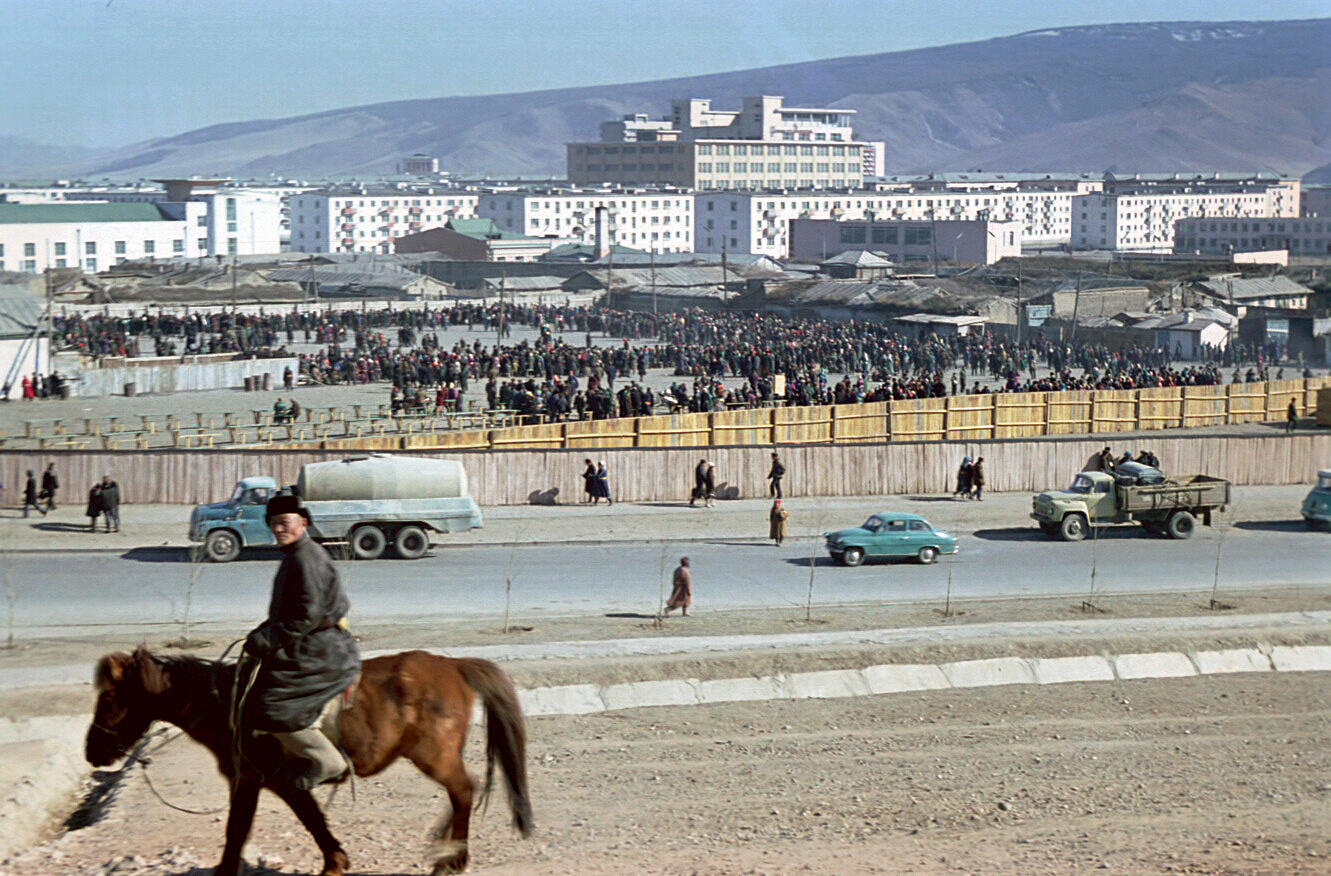
Outdoor market near Gandan hill in 1972. State Department Store in the background

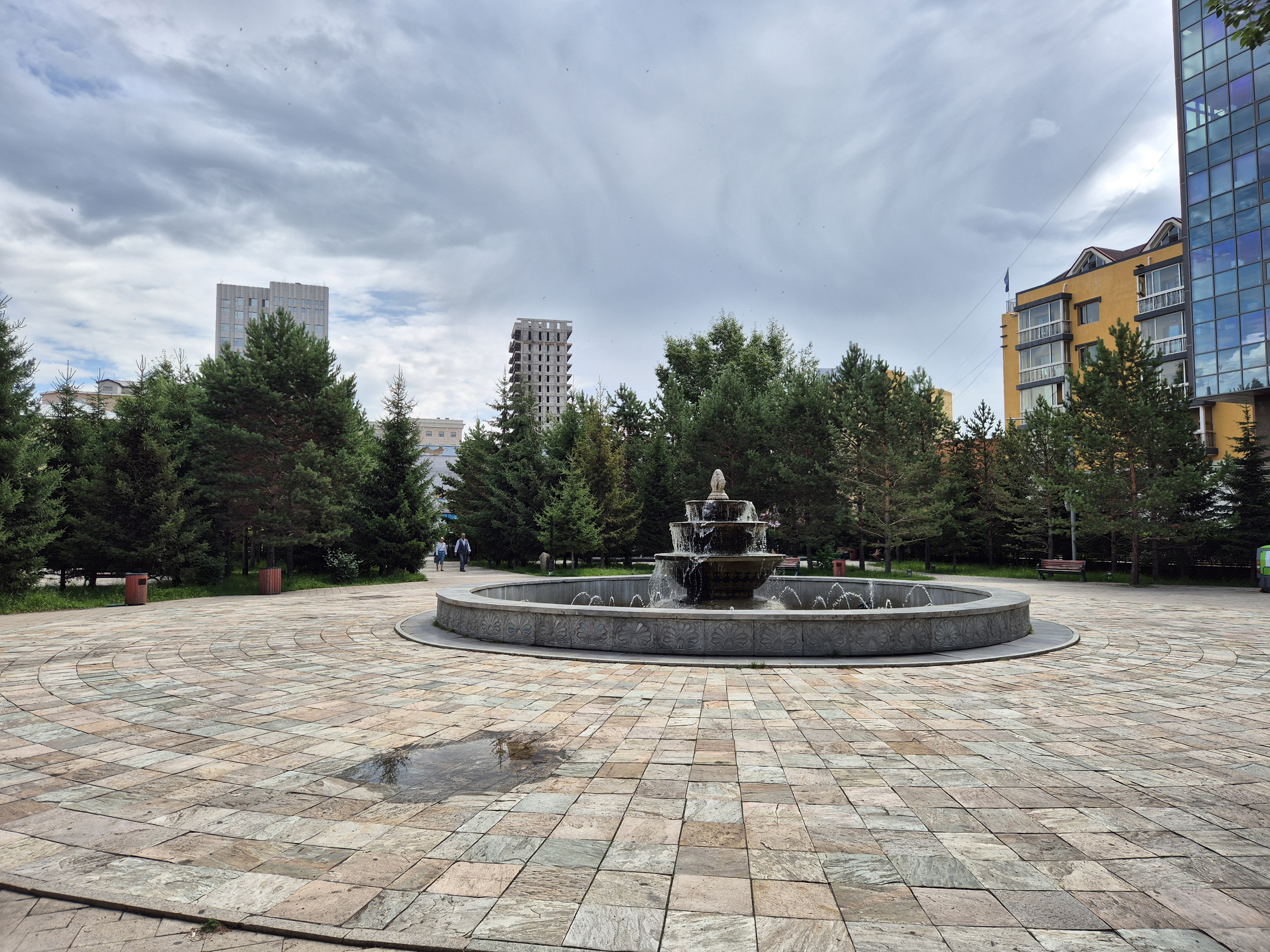
Green areas were increased in the city center during the communist era

The Moscow trade expedition of the 1910s estimated the population of Urga at 60,000 based on Nikolay Przhevalsky's study in the 1870s. The city's population swelled during the Naadam festival and major religious festivals to more than 100,000. In 1919 the number of monks had reached 20,000, up from 13,000 in 1810. In 1910 the amban Sando went to quell a major fight between Gandan lamas and Chinese traders started by an incident at the Da Yi Yu shop in the Baruun Damnuurchin market district. He was unable to bring the lamas under control and was forced to flee back to his quarters. In 1911, with the Qing Dynasty in China headed for total collapse, Mongolian leaders in Ikh Khüree for Naadam met in secret on Mount Bogd Khan Uul and resolved to end 220 years of Manchu control of their country. On December 29, 1911 the 8th Jeptsundamba Khutughtu was declared ruler of an independent Mongolia and assumed the title Bogd Khan. Khüree as the seat of the Jebtsundamba Khutugtu was the logical choice for the capital of the new state. However, in the tripartite Kyakhta agreement of 1915 (between Russia, China, Mongolia), Mongolia's status was changed to mere autonomy. In 1919, Mongolian nobles, over the opposition of the Bogd Khan, agreed with the Chinese resident Chen Yi on a settlement of the "Mongolian question" along Qing-era lines, but before this settlement could be put into effect, Khüree was occupied by the troops of Chinese warlord Xu Shuzheng, who forced the Mongolian nobles and clergy to renounce autonomy completely.

In 1921 the city changed hands twice. First, on February 4, 1921, a mixed Russian/Mongolian force led by White Russian warlord Roman von Ungern-Sternberg captured the city, freeing the Bogd Khan from Chinese imprisonment and killing a part of the Chinese garrison. Baron Ungern's capture of Urga was followed by clearing out Mongolia's small gangs of demoralized Chinese soldiers and, at the same time, looting and murder of foreigners, including a vicious pogrom that killed off the Jewish community. On February 22, 1921 the Bogd Khan was once again elevated the Great Khan of Mongolia in Urga. However, at the same time Baron Ungern was taking control of Urga, a Soviet-supported Communist Mongolian force led by Damdin Sükhbaatar was forming up in Russia, and in March they crossed the border. Ungern and his men rode out in May to meet Red Russian and Red Mongolian troops, but suffered a disastrous defeat in June. In July the Communist Soviet-Mongolian army became the second conquering force in six months to enter Urga. Mongolia came to the control of the Soviet Russia. On October 29, 1924 the town was renamed to Ulaanbaatar (Mongolian "red hero"), by the advice of T.R. Ryskulov, the Soviet representative in Mongolia.

In the socialist period, and especially following the Second World War, most of the old ger districts were replaced by Soviet-style blocks of flats, often financed by the Soviet Union. Urban planning began in the 1950s, and most of the city today is the result of construction from 1960 to 1985. The Transmongolian Railway, connecting Ulaanbaatar with Moscow and Beijing, was completed in 1956, and cinemas, theaters, museums etc. were erected. On the other hand, most of the temples and monasteries of pre-socialist Khüree were destroyed following the anti-religious purges of the late 1930s. The Gandan monastery was reopened in 1944 when US Vice President Henry Wallace asked to see a monastery during his visit to Mongolia.

== Democratic revolution ==
Ulaanbaatar was the site of demonstrations that led to Mongolia's transition to democracy and market economy in 1990. On December 10, 1989, protesters outside the Youth Culture Centre called for Mongolia to implement perestroika and glasnost in their full sense. Dissident leaders demanded free elections and economic reform. On January 14, 1990 the protesters, having grown from two hundred to over a thousand, met at the Lenin Museum in Ulaanbaatar. A demonstration in Sükhbaatar Square on Jan. 21 followed. Afterwards, weekend demonstrations in January and February were held accompanied by the forming of Mongolia's first opposition parties. On March 7, ten dissidents assembled in Sükhbaatar Square and went on a hunger strike. Thousands of supporters joined them. More came on March 8, and the crowd grew more unruly; seventy people were injured and one killed. On March 9 the communist Mongolian People's Revolutionary Party government resigned. The provisional government announced Mongolia's first free elections, which were held in July. The MPRP won the election and resumed power.

Since Mongolia's transition to a market economy in 1990, the city has experienced further growth - especially in the ger districts, as construction of new blocks of flats had basically broken down in the 1990s. The population has more than doubled to over one million inhabitants, about 50% of Mongolia's entire population. This causes a number of social, environmental, and transportation problems. In recent years, construction of new buildings has gained new momentum, especially in the city center, and apartment prices have skyrocketed.

== 2008 protests ==
In 2008, Ulaanbaatar was the scene of riots after the Mongolian Democratic, Civic Will Party and Republican parties disputed the Mongolian People's Revolutionary Party's victory in the parliamentary elections. Approximately 30,000 people took part in a public meeting led by the opposition parties. After the meeting was over some protestors left the central square and moved on to the nearby headquarters of the Mongolian People's Revolutionary Party, attacking and burning the building. A police station was also attacked. At night rioters set fire to the Cultural Palace, where a theatre, museum and National art gallery were vandalised and burned. Torched cars, bank robberies and looting were reported. The organisations in the burning buildings were vandalised and looted. Police used tear gas, rubber bullets and water cannons against stone-throwing protestors. A four-day state of emergency was declared, the capital was placed under a 22:00 to 08:00 curfew, and alcohol sales banned, following which measures rioting did not resume. Five people were killed and hundreds arrested by the police during the suppression of the riots. Human rights groups expressed concerns about the handling of this unprecedented incident by the authorities.

== Recent developments ==
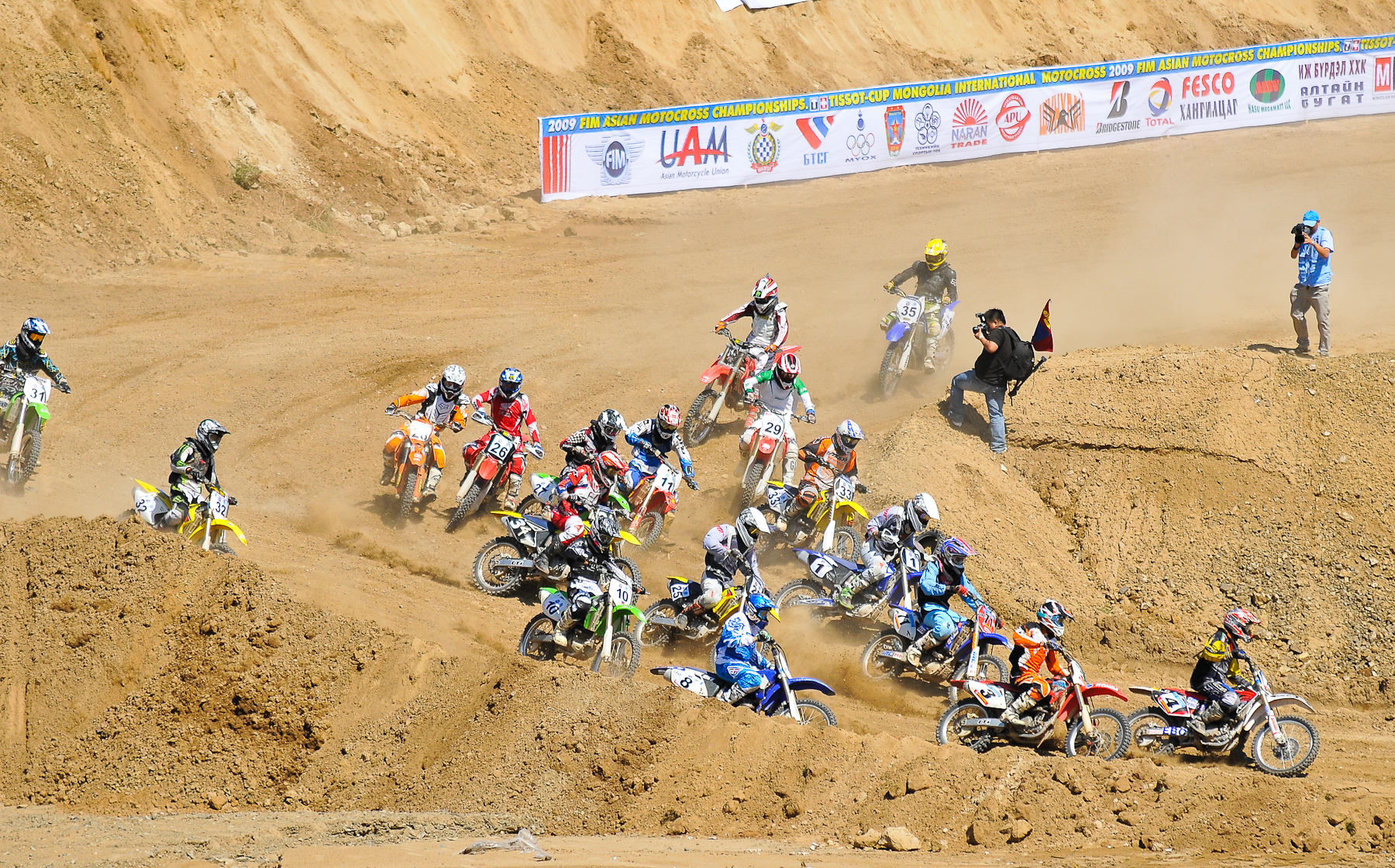
July 19, 2009 FIM Asian Motocross Championship in Ulaanbaatar

After the Oyu Tolgoi investment agreement was signed in 2009 the first phase of the Mongolian mining boom started. Ulaanbaatar as the capital of the country came to be labelled one of the world's top frontier investment destinations. From 2009 to 2012 Ulaanbaatar's position rapidly rose in the investment world. Miners and bankers flocked to the city as construction and other sectors boomed. In September 2011 Ulaanbaatar was featured on CNNGo TV - the same year Mongolia had the fastest GDP growth in the world at 17.3%. Developments in the Mongolian parliament in Ulaanbaatar came to be closely watched by foreign investors. The pace of growth slowed after the passing of SEFIL (Strategic Entities Foreign Investment Law) in 2012. Although the law was amended in 2013 the pace of growth has yet to return to previous boom levels. In the meantime Ulaanbaatar has been steadily increasing its international profile on a political and international relations level. Ulaanbaatar has been receiving regular OSCE delegations after Mongolia became a participating state of the Organization of Security and Cooperation in Europe in November 2012. In April 2013 Ulaanbaatar (as capital of the country holding presidency) successfully hosted the 7th Ministerial Conference of the Community of Democracies attended by 1,215 delegates from 104 countries. Aung San Suu Kyi was one of the attendees. It has also hosted the North Korea-Japan talks on abduction issues. In November 2013 Ulaanbaatar organized the first Meeting of Women Parliamentarians of Northeast Asian Countries. In June 2014 it hosted the first international conference of the Ulaanbaatar Dialogue on Northeast Asian Security. In August 2014 Ulaanbaatar hosted the Northeast Asian Mayors' Forum and became sister cities with Beijing. In August and September 2014 Ulaanbaatar was visited by both General Secretary of the Chinese Communist Party Xi Jinping and President of Russia Vladimir Putin. In 2016 Ulaanbaatarwill host the 11th Asia Europe Meeting (ASEM Summit). Ulaanbaatar also started hosting international music concerts in large stadiums. Michael Learns to Rock, ONYX and the Korean K-pop group T-ara have all performed in Ulaanbaatar.

The city has become increasingly Anglophone and English signs are common on streets and billboards. Korean culture also has a strong influence in the city as reflected in the numerous Korean businesses in the city center and the adoption of Korean styles among a large number of urban youth.
