= Ger district =

Type of residential district in Mongolia

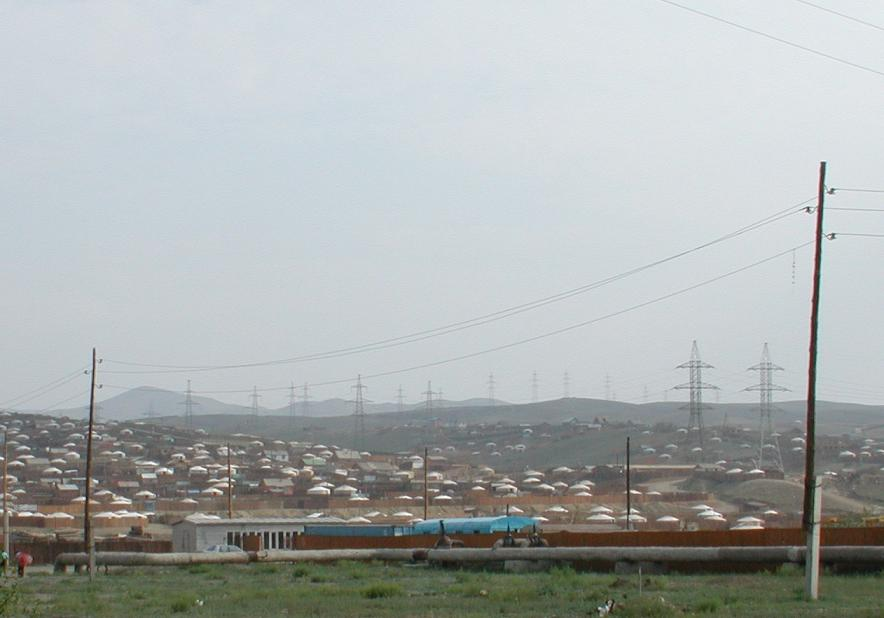
A ger district on the outskirts of Ulaanbaatar

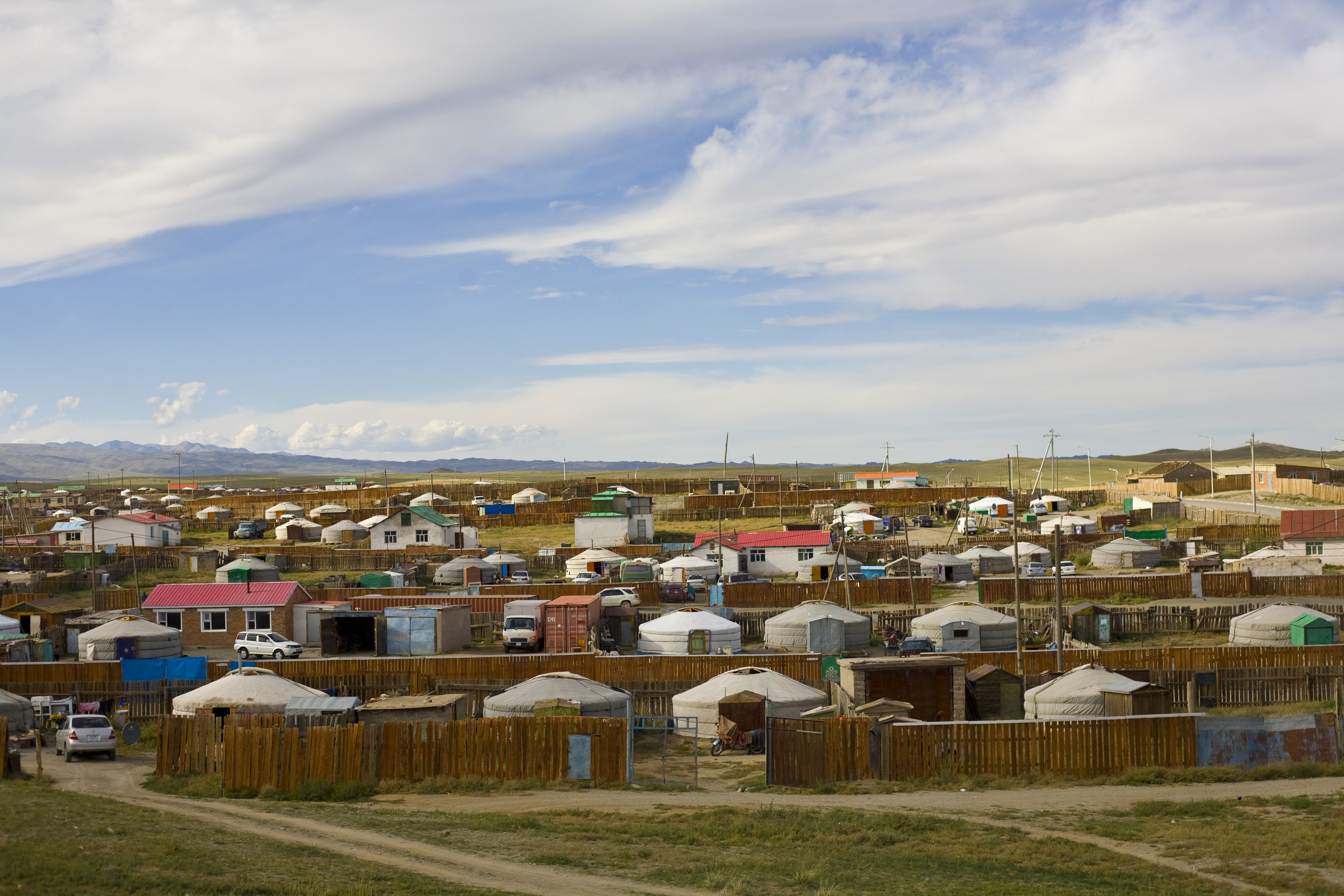
A ger district in Govi-Altai Province

A ger district (Mongolian: гэр хороолол, Ger khoroolol) is a form of residential district in Mongolian settlements. They usually consist of parcels with one or more detached traditional mobile dwellings or gers (hence the name), surrounded by two-metre-high wooden fences. In other countries, gers are known as yurts.

Most ger districts are not connected to water supplies, so people get their drinking water from public wells. For a warm shower or a bath, there are bathhouses. Since there is no sewer system, ger district parcels usually have a pit toilet.

Small settlements, like sum centers, may consist almost exclusively of ger districts. Even in Mongolia's capital Ulaanbaatar, around 62% of the population live in such districts. However, only about 43% of the ger district residents in Ulaanbaatar actually live in gers. Some of the districts in Ulaanbaatar have existed for more than 100 years, for example the one around Gandan, but many of those farther away from the city centre are the result of recent migration and the high price of other housing in Ulaanbaatar.

An oft-cited problem of ger districts in Ulaanbaatar and a number of other larger Mongolian cities is the air pollution (especially in winter) caused by the burning of raw coal in simple iron stoves for cooking and heating.

== Citizen groups in ger districts ==
Ulaanbaatar's ger district is evolving and is marked by swift change over the past three decades since 1990, coupled with rising inequality. The citizen groups (CGs), semi-formal civil society organizations mainly led by women, work in ger suburbs surrounding Ulaanbaatar.

These CGs engage in small-scale projects, demonstrating resource management skills. Despite government recognition of state-civil society partnership, there is a gap in practice, particularly in ger districts.

Challenges include high staff turnover, limited local government authority, and unclear legal status for CGs.
