= Khamnigaday =

Khamnigaday Хамнигадай
- Selo
- Location within Republic of Buryatia Location within Russia
- Coordinates: 50°10′N 107°25′E
- Country: Russia
- Region: Republic of Buryatia
- District: Kyakhtinsky District
- Time zone: UTC+8:00

Khamnigaday (Russian: Хамнигадай) is a rural locality (a selo) in Kyakhtinsky District, Republic of Buryatia, Russia. The population was 92 as of 2010. There are 2 streets.

== Geography ==
Khamnigaday is located 94 km southeast of Kyakhta (the district's administrative centre) by road. Kudara-Somon is the nearest rural locality.
