= Pervomayskoye, Republic of Buryatia =

Pervomayskoye Первомайское
- Selo
- Location within Republic of Buryatia Location within Russia
- Coordinates: 50°06′N 107°26′E
- Country: Russia
- Region: Republic of Buryatia
- District: Kyakhtinsky District
- Time zone: UTC+8:00

Pervomayskoye (Russian: Первомайское) is a rural locality (a selo) in Kyakhtinsky District, Republic of Buryatia, Russia. The population was 133 as of 2010. There are 4 streets.

== Geography ==
Pervomayskoye is located 95 km southeast of Kyakhta (the district's administrative centre) by road. Ara-Altsagat is the nearest rural locality.
