= Malaya Kudara =

Malaya Kudara Малая Кудара
- Selo
- Location within Republic of Buryatia Location within Russia
- Coordinates: 50°11′N 107°41′E
- Country: Russia
- Region: Republic of Buryatia
- District: Kyakhtinsky District
- Time zone: UTC+8:00

Malaya Kudara (Russian: Малая Кудара; Buryat: Бага Хγдэри, Baga Khüderi) is a rural locality (a selo) in Kyakhtinsky District, Republic of Buryatia, Russia. The population was 278 as of 2010. There are 5 streets.

== History ==
On July 10, 1826, the Church of the Intercession of the Holy Virgin was consecrated in Malaya Kudara. The construction of the church was partially financed by the Kyakhta merchant Nikolai Matveevich Igumnov, who donated three bells. In 1859, the Kyakhta first-guild merchant Ya. A. Nemchinov donated a bell weighing 13 poods (213 kg). The church was wooden, one-story, 9 sazhen (16,5 m) long and 3.5 sazhen (6,4 m) wide.

On January 1, 1886, a parochial school was opened.

== Geography ==
Malaya Kudara is located 114 km southeast of Kyakhta (the district's administrative centre) by road. Ulady is the nearest rural locality.
