= Bolshoy Lug, Republic of Buryatia =

Bolshoy Lug Большой Луг
- Selo
- Location within Republic of Buryatia Location within Russia
- Coordinates: 50°36′N 106°46′E
- Country: Russia
- Region: Republic of Buryatia
- District: Kyakhtinsky District
- Time zone: UTC+8:00

Bolshoy Lug (Russian: Большой Луг; Buryat: Ехэ Нуга, Yekhe Nuga) is a rural locality (a selo) in Kyakhtinsky District, Republic of Buryatia, Russia. The population was 653 as of 2010. There are 11 streets.

== Geography ==
Bolshoy Lug is located 58 km northeast of Kyakhta (the district's administrative centre) by road. Kharlun is the nearest rural locality.
