= Dureny =

Dureny Дурены
- Selo
- Location within Republic of Buryatia Location within Russia
- Coordinates: 50°19′N 106°52′E
- Country: Russia
- Region: Republic of Buryatia
- District: Kyakhtinsky District
- Time zone: UTC+8:00

Dureny (Russian: Дурены) is a rural locality (a selo) in Kyakhtinsky District, Republic of Buryatia, Russia. The population was 145 as of 2010. There are 2 streets.

== Geography ==
Dureny is located 41 km southeast of Kyakhta (the district's administrative centre) by road. Kurort Kiran is the nearest rural locality.
