= Polkanovo =

Polkanovo Полканово
- Selo
- Location within Republic of Buryatia Location within Russia
- Coordinates: 50°18′N 107°02′E
- Country: Russia
- Region: Republic of Buryatia
- District: Kyakhtinsky District
- Time zone: UTC+8:00

Polkanovo (Russian: Полканово) is a rural locality (a selo) in Kyakhtinsky District, Republic of Buryatia, Russia. The population was 146 as of 2010. There are 3 streets. It is also known as Polkanovskiy. Polkanovo is located in the Republic of Buryatia in Russia. It has a subarctic climate and is classified as Dwc in the Köppen climate classification. The timezone is UTC+8.

== Geography ==
Polkanovo is located 62 km southeast of Kyakhta (the district's administrative centre) by road. Ungurkuy is the nearest rural locality.
