= Anagustay =

Anagustay Анагустай
- Selo
- Location within Republic of Buryatia Location within Russia
- Coordinates: 49°59′N 107°34′E
- Country: Russia
- Region: Republic of Buryatia
- District: Kyakhtinsky District
- Time zone: UTC+8:00

Anagustay (Russian: Анагустай) is a rural locality (a selo) in Kyakhtinsky District, Republic of Buryatia, Russia. The population was 102 as of 2010. There is 1 street.

== Geography ==
Anagustay is located 129 km southeast of Kyakhta (the district's administrative centre) by road. Ust-Dunguy is the nearest rural locality.
