= Banque de l'Indochine Building, Shanghai =

1914 commercial building in China

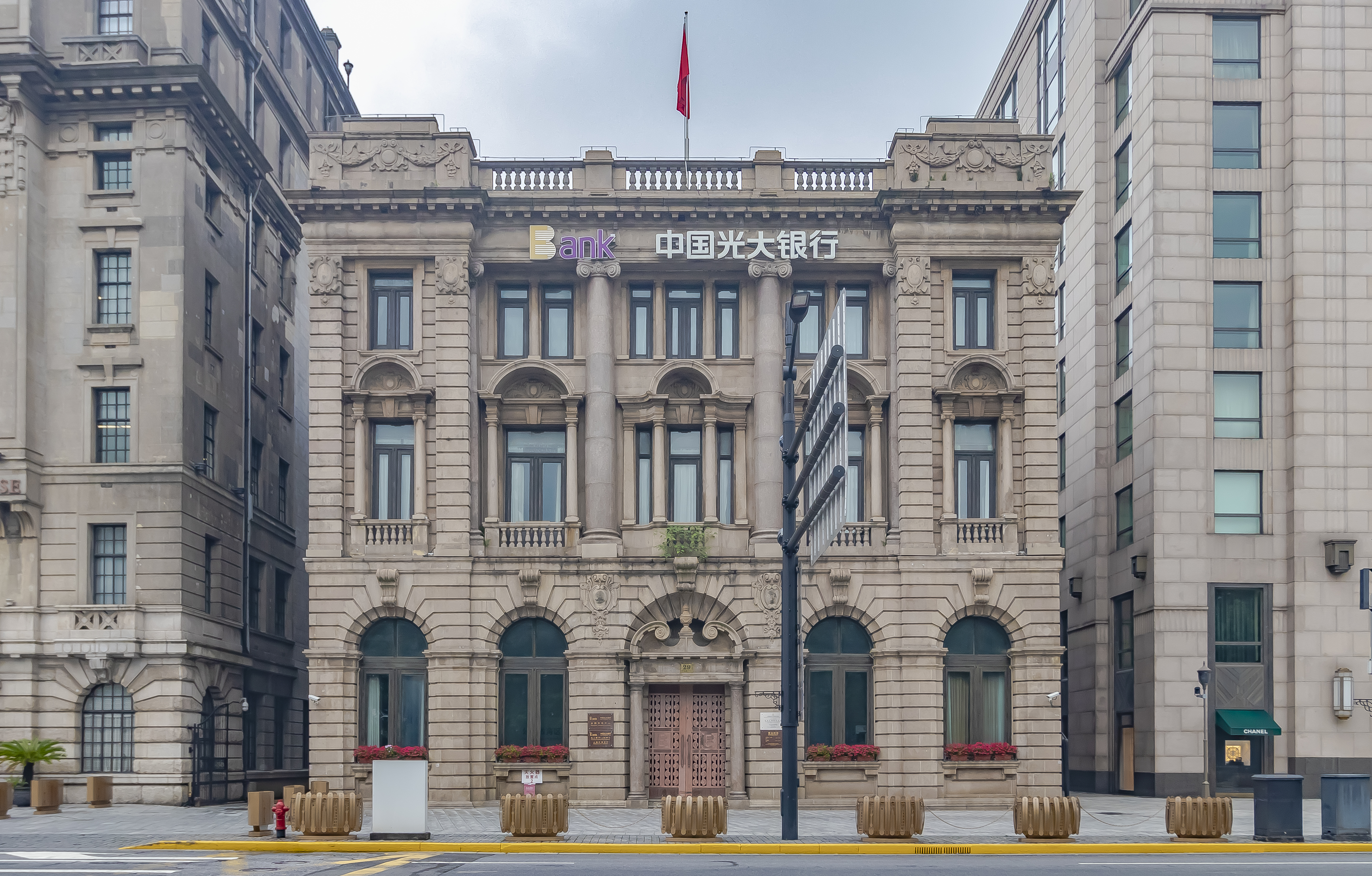
- The Banque de l'Indochine Building in 2021
- Interactive map of the Banque de l'Indochine Building, Shanghai area

General information
- Architectural style: Renaissance, Baroque, Neoclassical
- Location: 29 Zhongshan East Road, The Bund, Huangpu, Shanghai, China
- Coordinates: 31.2431°N 121.4855°E
- Construction started: 1911
- Completed: 1914
- Opened: June 13, 1914
- Owner: China Everbright Bank

Height
- Height: 21.6 m (71 ft)

Technical details
- Material: Reinforced concrete, brick, timber
- Floor count: 3
- Floor area: 2,772 m^{2} (29,840 sq ft)

Design and construction
- Architect: G. McGrva
- Architecture firm: Atkinson & Dallas
- Main contractor: Xie Sheng Construction Plant
- 东方汇理银行大楼 (Chinese)
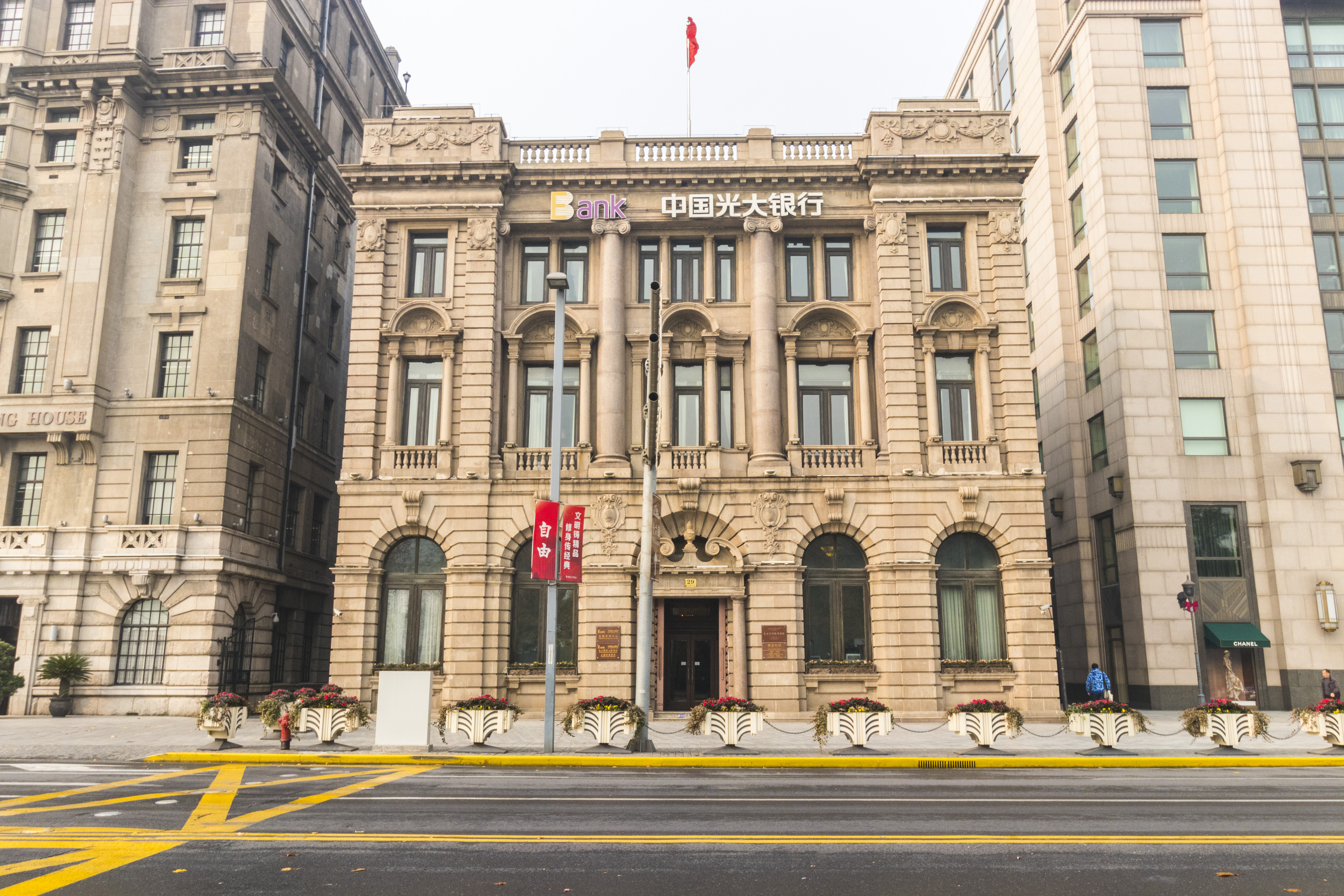
- The Banque de l'Indochine Building in 2017
- Type: Important near-modern historical sites and representative buildings
- Location: Shanghai, China

History
- Built: 1914

Site notes
- Area: Huangpu, Shanghai
- Governing body: National Cultural Heritage Administration

Major cultural heritage sites under national-level protection
- Designated: 20 November 1996
- Reference no.: 4-220

The Banque de l'Indochine Building (Chinese: 东方汇理银行大楼; pinyin: dōngfāng huì lǐ yínháng dàlóu) is a building designed by architecture firm Atkinson & Dallas as a branch building for the Banque de l'Indochine, in The Bund, Shanghai. The building is at No.29, The Bund, and was built in the former Shanghai International Settlement. Construction began in 1911 and ended in 1914 by contractor Xie Sheng Construction Plant. It currently houses the China Everbright Bank.

The Banque de l'Indochine building is the only building in the Bund to have only 3 floors, and is one of the shortest buildings of the Bund. However, with an average floor height of 7.3 metres, out of all the buildings in the Bund, it has the highest average floor height. It is also the only building in the Bund which was completely constructed with French investment.

== History ==
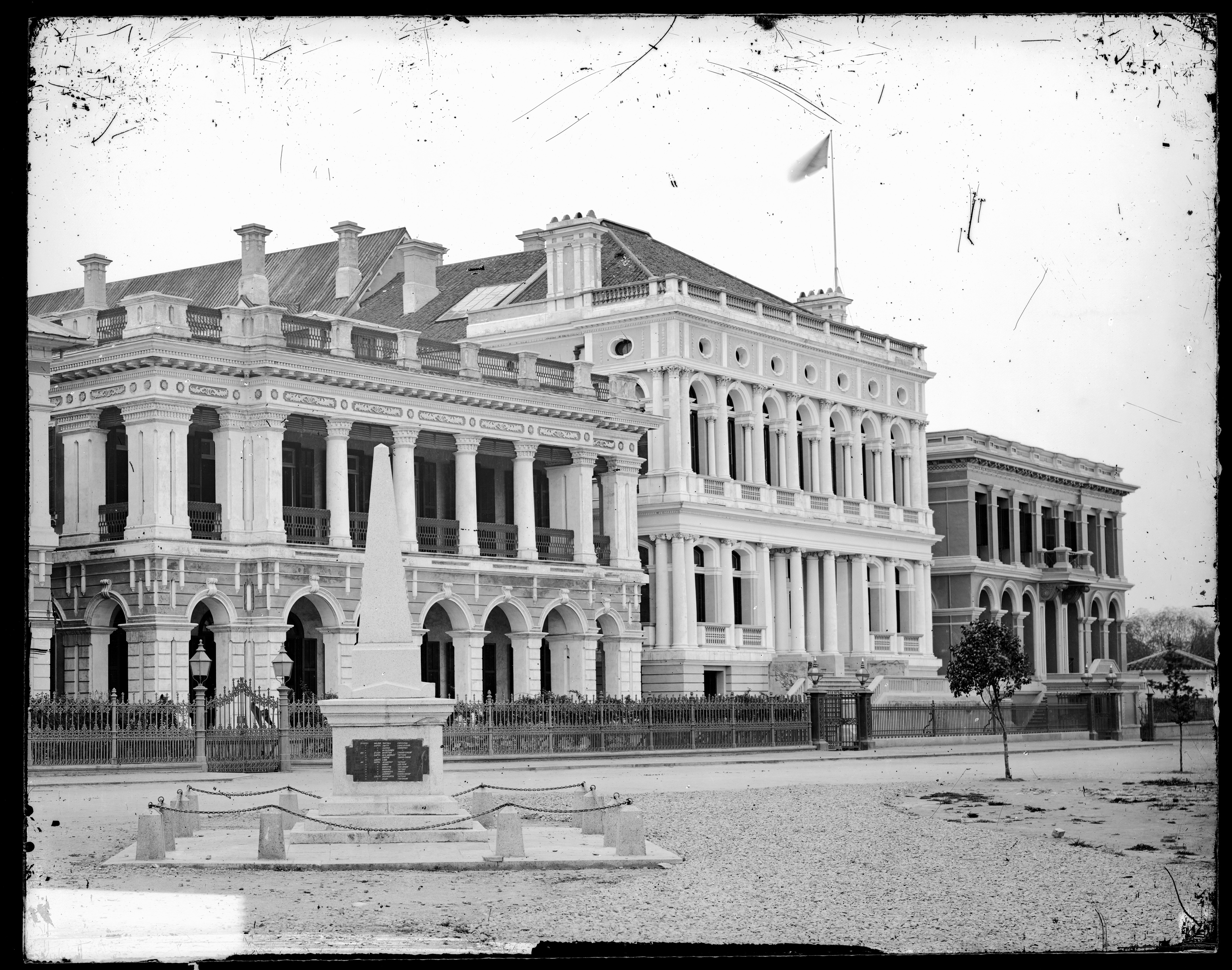
From left to right, Siemssen & Co, the original building of the Banque de l'Indochine, and the former No. 27 Building (now the Jardine Matheson Building). Taken in 1872

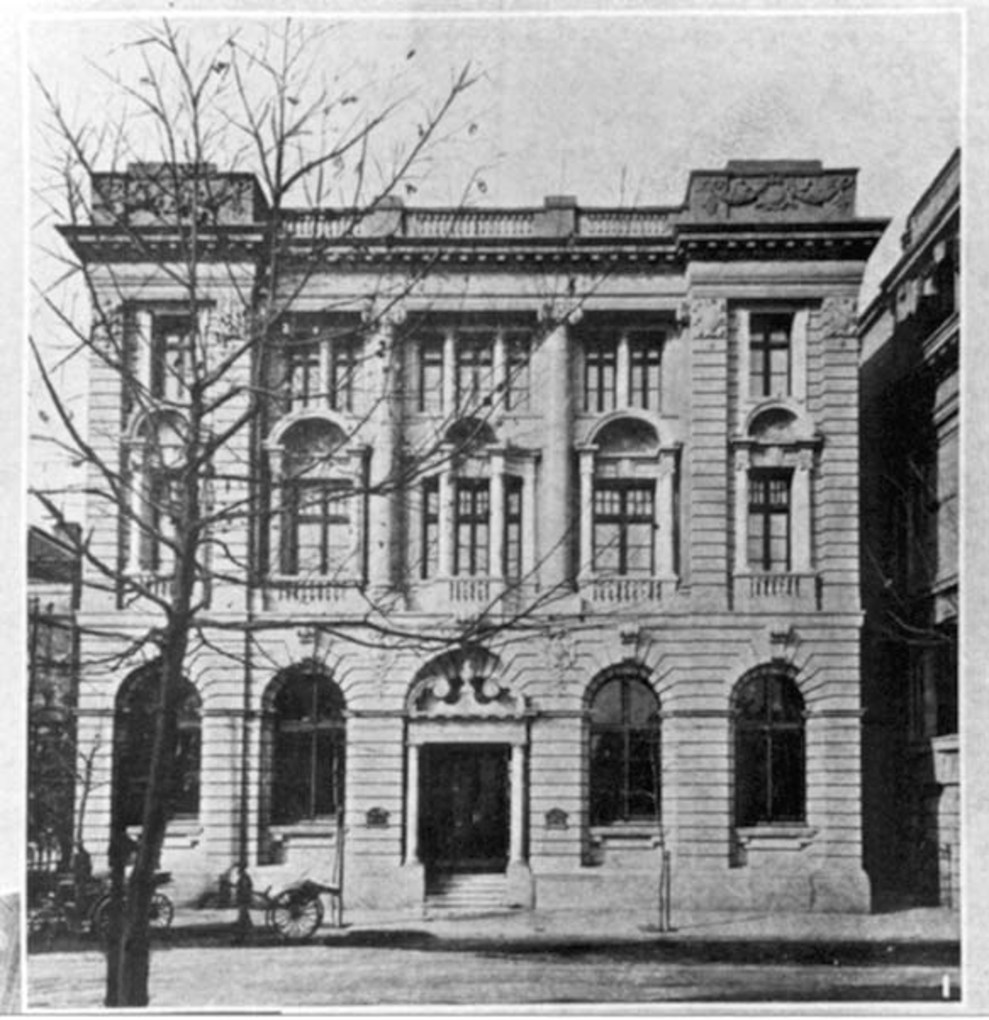
No.29, The Bund, in 1917

The Banque de l'Indochine established a branch in Shanghai in 1899, within the French concession.

The Comptoir national d'escompte de Paris was a major shareholder of the Russo-Chinese Bank and the Banque de l'Indochine, and when the Russo-Chinese Bank opened its branch in Shanghai in 1896, it was housed in No.29, The Bund. The original building at No.29, The Bund, was previously owned by the Bank of Hindustan, China and Japan and was a two-storey brick and timber East Indian-style house. It was bought by the Comptoir national d'escompte de Paris before the Banque de l'Indochine or the Russo-Chinese Bank established a branch in China. In 1902, the Russo-Chinese Bank bought No.15, The Bund, after the bankruptcy of its previous owner, Dent & Co. The bank was moved there (now the Russo-Chinese Bank Building). The Banque de l'Indochine subsequently moved into No.29, The Bund. The branch was mainly used for issuing banknotes, taking in deposits, and supporting French businesses in China.

In 1911, to meet increasing business demands, the Banque de l'Indochine demolished the original building and constructed the Banque de l'Indochine building at the same address, No 29, The Bund.

After the Battle of Shanghai in 1937 and the subsequent occupation of the Shanghai International Settlement in 1941, Japanese forces occupied all of Shanghai. However, the Banque de l'Indochine could continue its services because of the neutrality of Vichy France.

During World War II, the formation of Vichy France meant that the Banque de l'Indochine was still able to operate normally.

After the Surrender of Japan, all Japanese businesses in Shanghai were cleared, and the Banque de l'Indochine's business grew as the competition decreased.

In 1949, after the victory of the Chinese Communist Party in the Chinese Civil War, the Banque de l'Indochine was made a 'designated bank' by the new government to act as a medium for foreign currency exchange.

However, in the 1950s, foreign investment and businesses gradually left China, causing business for the Banque de l'Indochine unsuitable. In 1955, the Banque de l'Indochine withdrew their branch in Shanghai.

In 1956, the vacant building was taken over by the Shanghai Municipal Housing Authority, and began to house the Traffic Department of Shanghai Public Security Bureau.

In 1989, The Banque de l'Indochine building was designated as an 'Outstanding Historical Building of Shanghai' by the Shanghai Municipal People's Government, in the first batch of such designated buildings.

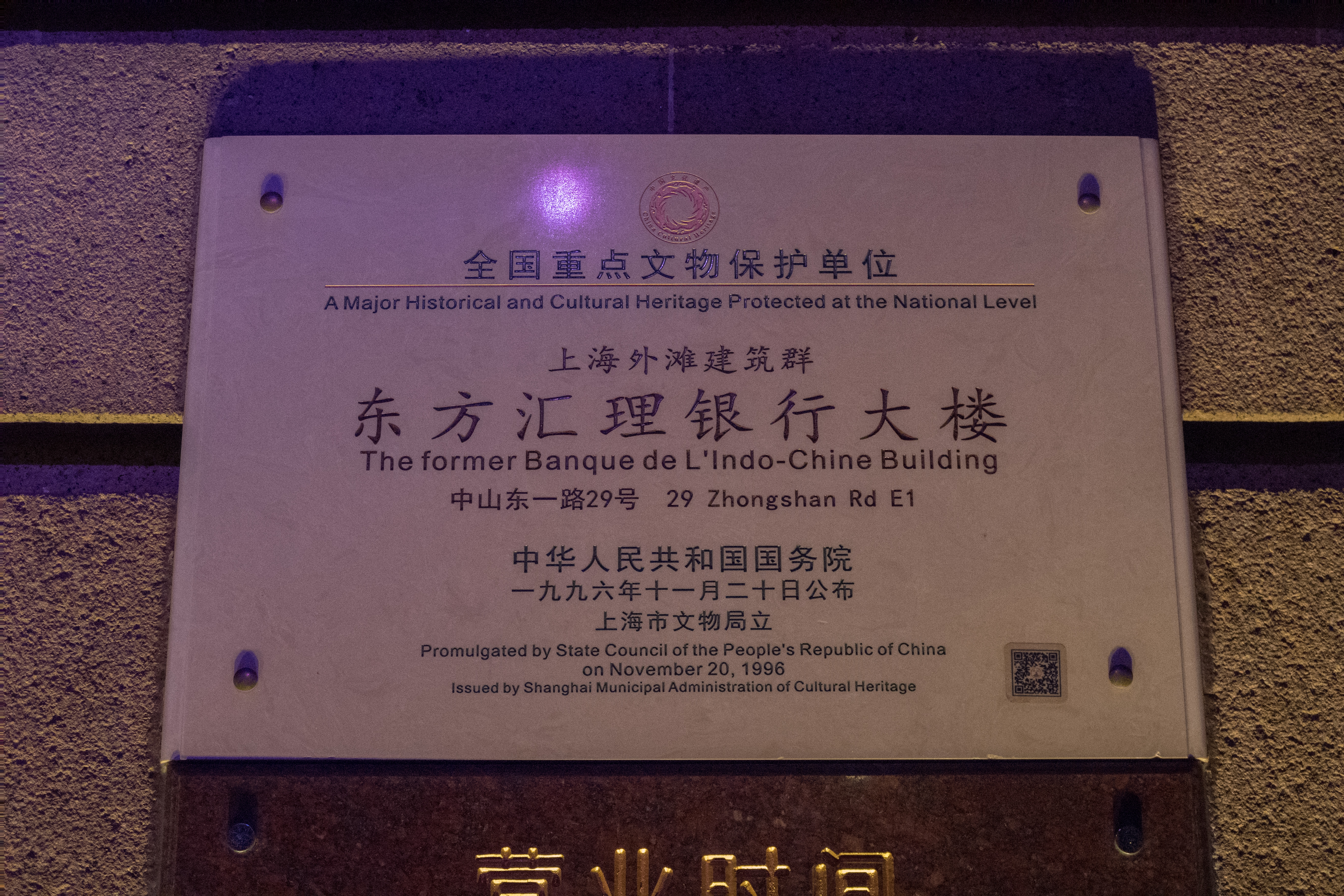
Protection sign on the building

In 1995, China Everbright Bank responded to the call of the Shanghai Municipal Committee and Municipal Government to rebuild the financial street on the Bund and moved from No. 2 Tianjin Road to the Banque de l'Indochine building as a trade-off. The building was again re-established as a bank.

In 1996, the Banque de l'Indochine building was mentioned in the fourth batch of Major cultural heritage site under national-level protection by the State Council of the People's Republic of China, alongside the whole Bund complex, as 'Important near-modern historical sites and representative buildings'

== Architecture ==
The Banque de l'Indochine building is a building designed in the Renaissance, Baroque, and Neoclassical architectural styles.

=== Exterior ===
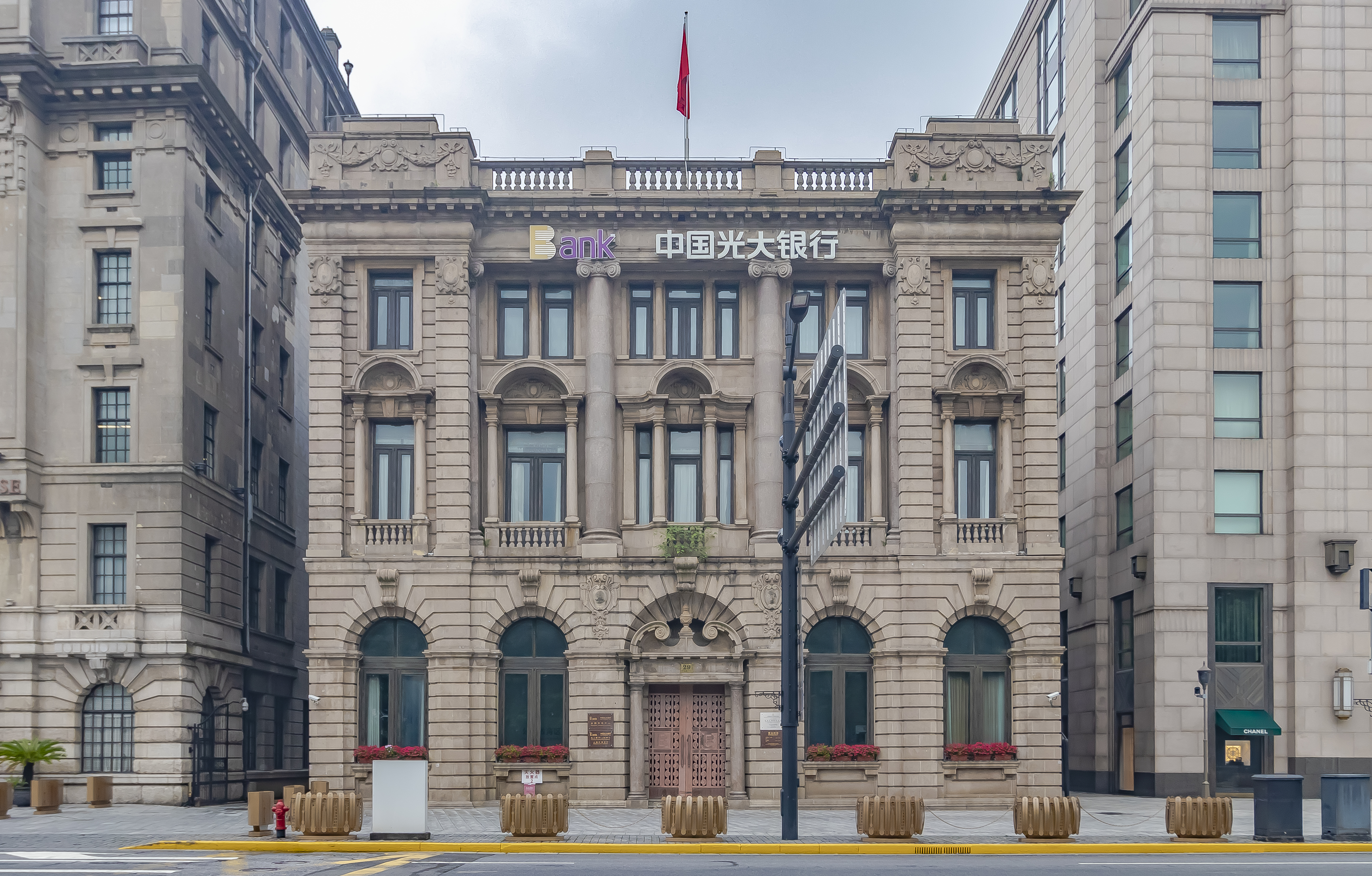
Main entrance of the Banque de l'Indochine building

The east façade of the building is the main façade, with a tripartite design, a typical French classical construction. The main entrance of the building facade is the main axis, and the two sides are symmetrical. There are two Ionic columns running through the second and third floors, and a deformed Palladian motif is used for the middle span of the first floor.

The doors and windows of the main entrance on the first floor are visually enhanced. The main entrance of the building facade is the main axis, and the two sides are symmetrical. The main entrance is slightly larger than the other four window openings next to it in order to enhance it visually. Two Tuscan columns are used to support an architrave, frieze and a broken pediment. An arch is made into a niche to emphasise the scroll-shaped broken pediment. There are shield-shaped decorations on the spandrels on both sides.

The east façade, as well as the north and south façades of the building, are faced with Suzhou granite, with the surface roughened. The west façade is cement rendered. The columns at the main entrance and running through the second and third floors are made of polished Qingdao granite.

=== Interior ===
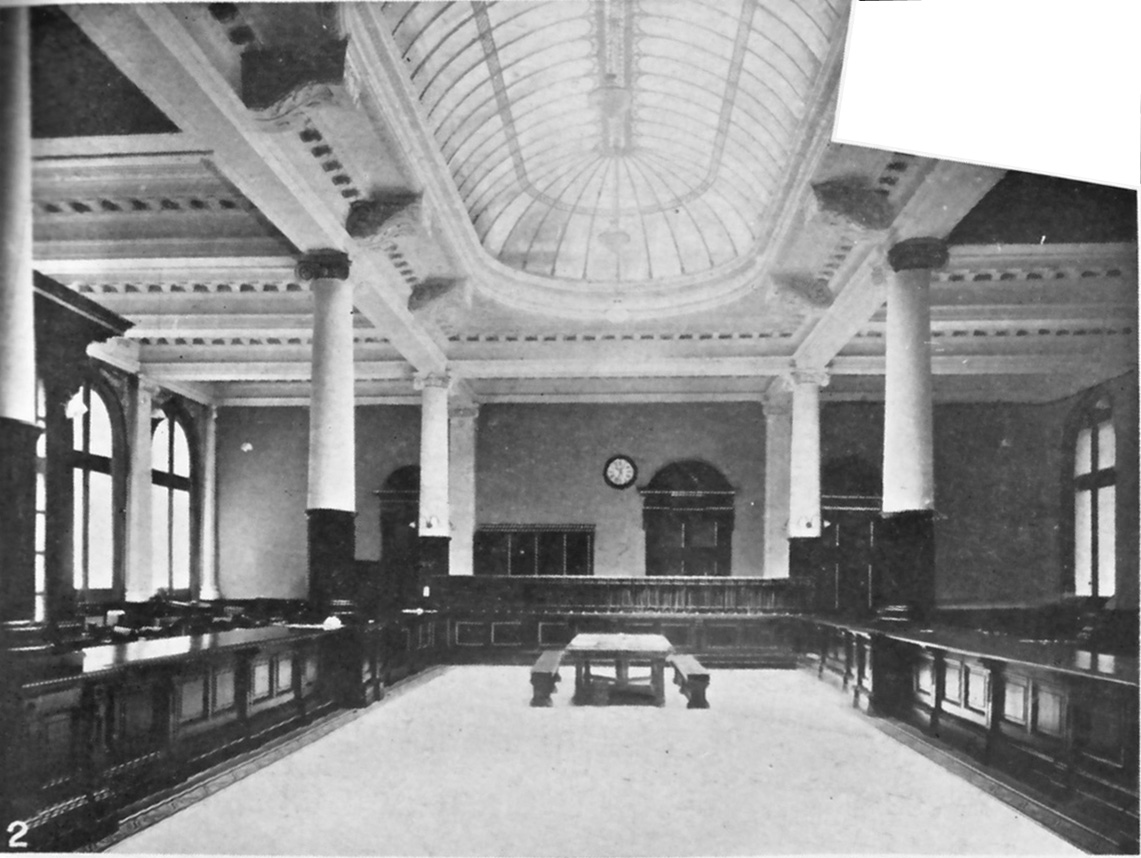
Inside the Hall of the Banque de l'Indochine

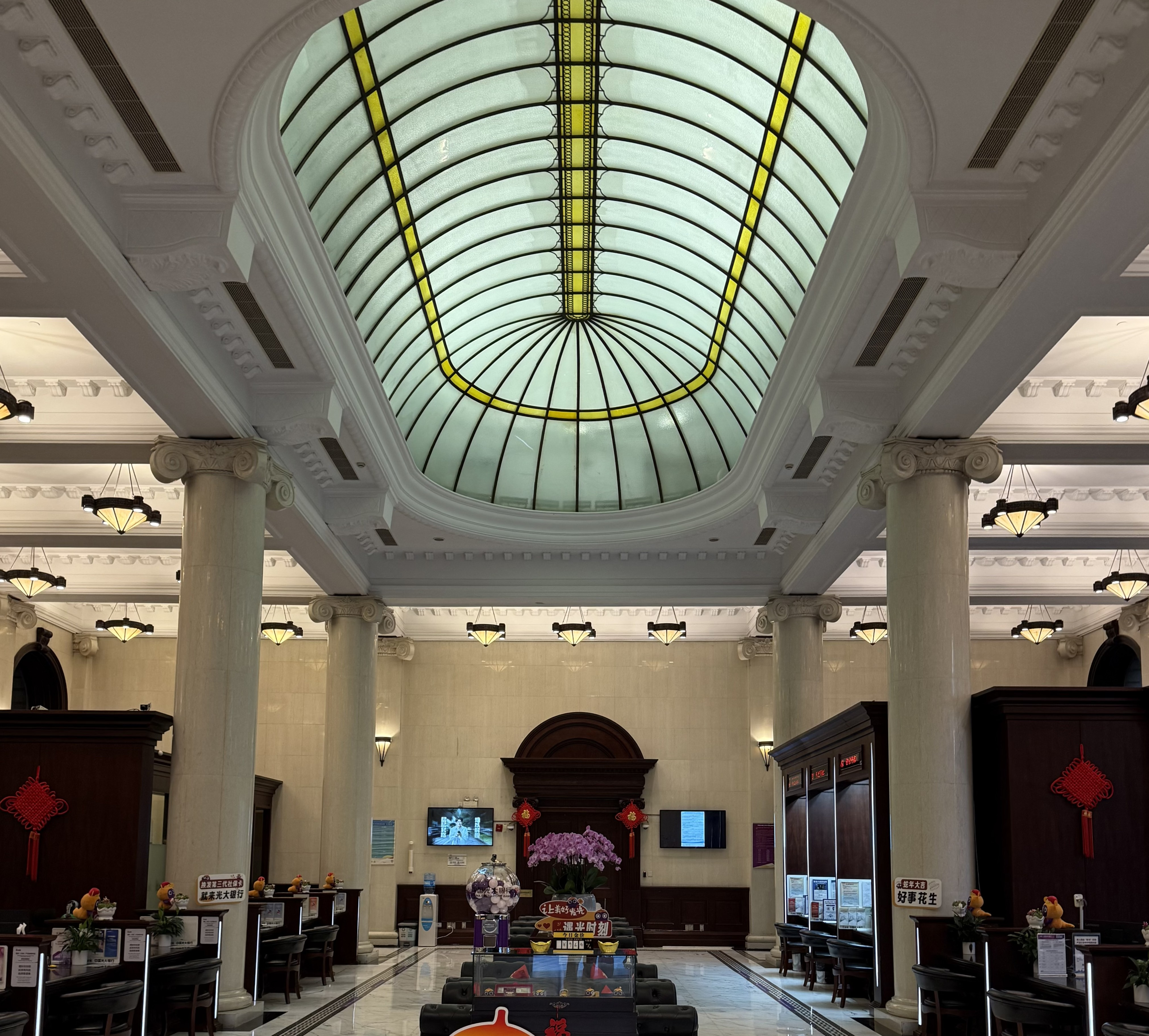
Cash hall in 2025

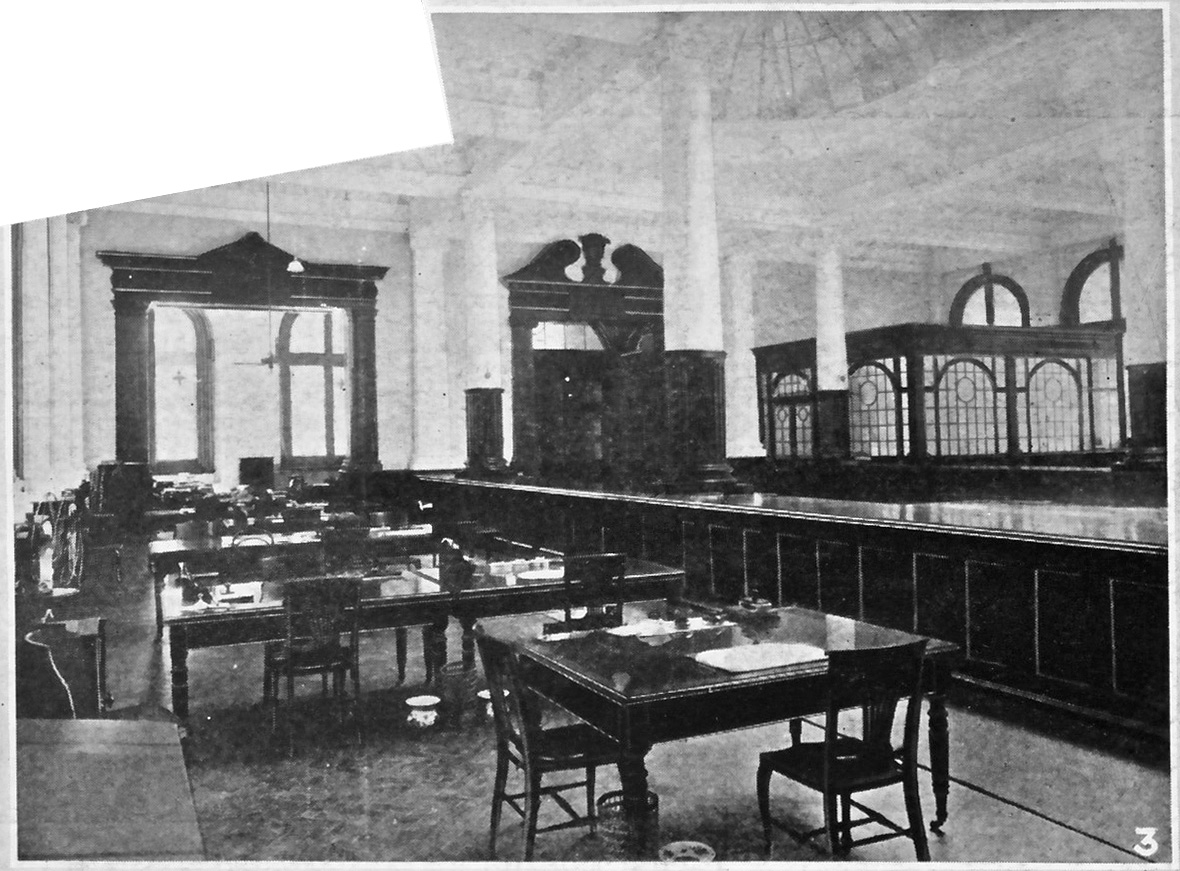
Inside the Office of the Banque de l'Indochine building

The wood decoration within the interior is teak, with a Baroque decorative style. When it was first built, the centre of the first floor was the bank's hall, a large space supported by six Ionic columns. The six columns are divided into two rows, dividing the ceiling into three sections. The beams on the left and right sections of the ceiling form a grid-shaped ceiling with exquisite moldings and dense dentil decoration. The middle section of the ceiling is covered with a rectangular arched glass ceiling. The glass ceiling is supported by fine arch ribs and is partially decorated. Low teak counters are arranged along the columns in the hall. The six columns have rectangular teak plinths at the bottom, which are connected with the counters. The walls around the hall are covered with Ionic pilasters.

The second and third floors were originally bank staff apartments. There was a lighting courtyard in the centre to provide natural lighting for the staff apartments and for the first-floor glass ceiling to provide natural lighting for the hall.

== Alterations ==
A project to restore and protect the building was started in 2010, mostly to restore the building to what it looked like originally after multiple changes and damages to the building during its history.

=== Exterior ===
==== Facade ====
The facade was in good condition before the restoration. The main changes were cleaning the exterior wall and removing additions to it, such as exterior air conditioning units, and sorting the exposed pipes and wires. At the same time, the size of the company signage was reduced, and the material was changed from high-gloss to Matte.

=== Interior ===
==== Glass ceiling ====
The original arched glass ceiling was restored to a cylindrical curved surface from a curved rectangular surface.

Because the lighting courtyard of the building was covered by a concrete floor on the third floor, no natural light was able to light the hall. This was restored through the addition of LED lights at the inner arches of the ceiling that shine onto an arched reflective gypsum board above the glass ceiling, using soft and homogeneous reflected light to simulate natural lighting.

==== Interior main entrance ====
The main door on the west facade was restored to its original Baroque style, with wooden parapets and marble floor with ceramic mosaic tiles.
