= Verkhniye Murochi =

Verkhniye Murochi Верхние Мурочи
- Selo
- Location within Republic of Buryatia Location within Russia
- Coordinates: 50°15′N 106°58′E
- Country: Russia
- Region: Republic of Buryatia
- District: Kyakhtinsky District
- Time zone: UTC+8:00

Verkhniye Murochi (Russian: Верхние Мурочи) is a rural locality (a selo) in Kyakhtinsky District, Republic of Buryatia, Russia. The population was 10 as of 2010. There is 1 street.

== Geography ==
Verkhniye Murochi is located 53 km southeast of Kyakhta (the district's administrative centre) by road. Chikoy is the nearest rural locality.
