= Ara-Altsagat =

Ara-Altsagat Ара-Алцагат
- Ulus
- Location within Republic of Buryatia Location within Russia
- Coordinates: 50°07′N 107°26′E
- Country: Russia
- Region: Republic of Buryatia
- District: Kyakhtinsky District
- Time zone: UTC+8:00

Ara-Altsagat (Russian: Ара-Алцагат) is a rural locality (an ulus) in Kyakhtinsky District, Republic of Buryatia, Russia. The population was 330 as of 2010. There are 5 streets.

== Geography ==
Ara-Altsagat is located 93 km southeast of Kyakhta (the district's administrative centre) by road. Pervomayskoye is the nearest rural locality.
