= Ulady =

Ulady Уладый
- Selo
- Location within Republic of Buryatia Location within Russia
- Coordinates: 50°10′N 107°38′E
- Country: Russia
- Region: Republic of Buryatia
- District: Kyakhtinsky District
- Time zone: UTC+8:00

Ulady (Russian: Уладый) is a rural locality (a selo) in Kyakhtinsky District, Republic of Buryatia, Russia. The population was 189 as of 2010. There are 4 streets.

== Geography ==
Ulady is located 110 km southeast of Kyakhta (the district's administrative centre) by road. Malaya Kudara is the nearest rural locality.
