= Tsagan-Chelutay =

Tsagan-Chelutay Цаган-Челутай
- Ulus
- Location within Republic of Buryatia Location within Russia
- Coordinates: 49°59′N 107°28′E
- Country: Russia
- Region: Republic of Buryatia
- District: Kyakhtinsky District
- Time zone: UTC+8:00

Tsagan-Chelutay (Russian: Цаган-Челутай; Buryat: Сагаан Шулуута, Sagaan Shuluuta) is a rural locality (an ulus) in Kyakhtinsky District, Republic of Buryatia, Russia. The population was 77 as of 2010. There are 3 streets.

== Geography ==
Tsagan-Chelutay is located 120 km southeast of Kyakhta (the district's administrative centre) by road.
