= Ust-Kiran =

Ust-Kiran Усть-Киран
- Selo
- Location within Republic of Buryatia Location within Russia
- Coordinates: 50°24′N 106°48′E
- Country: Russia
- Region: Republic of Buryatia
- District: Kyakhtinsky District
- Time zone: UTC+8:00

Ust-Kiran (Russian: Усть-Киран) is a rural locality (a selo) in Kyakhtinsky District, Republic of Buryatia, Russia. The population was 1,100 as of 2010. There are 13 streets.

== Geography ==
Ust-Kiran is located 35 km northeast of Kyakhta (the district's administrative centre) by road. Khilgantuy is the nearest rural locality.
