= Burduny =

Burduny Бурдуны
- Ulus
- Location within Republic of Buryatia Location within Russia
- Coordinates: 50°24′N 106°37′E
- Country: Russia
- Region: Republic of Buryatia
- District: Kyakhtinsky District
- Time zone: UTC+8:00

Burduny (Russian: Бурдуны) is a rural locality (an ulus) in Kyakhtinsky District, Republic of Buryatia, Russia. The population was 128 as of 2010. There is 1 street.

== Geography ==
Burduny is located 22 km (14 mi) northeast of Kyakhta (the district's administrative centre) by road. Ust-Kiran is the nearest rural locality.
