= Kurort Kiran =

Kurort Kiran Курорт Киран
- Settlement
- Location within Republic of Buryatia Location within Russia
- Coordinates: 50°19′N 106°51′E
- Country: Russia
- Region: Republic of Buryatia
- District: Kyakhtinsky District
- Time zone: UTC+8:00

Kurort Kiran (Russian: Курорт Киран) is a rural locality (a settlement) in Kyakhtinsky District, Republic of Buryatia, Russia. The population was 145 as of 2010. There are 2 streets.

== Geography ==
Kurort Kiran is located 39 km southeast of Kyakhta (the district's administrative centre) by road. Dureny is the nearest rural locality.
