= Kalinishna =

Kalinishna Калинишна
- Selo
- Location within Republic of Buryatia Location within Russia
- Coordinates: 50°39′N 106°29′E
- Country: Russia
- Region: Republic of Buryatia
- District: Kyakhtinsky District
- Time zone: UTC+8:00

Kalinishna (Russian: Калинишна) is a rural locality (a selo) in Kyakhtinsky District, Republic of Buryatia, Russia. The population was 163 as of 2010. There are 2 streets.

== Geography ==
Kalinishna is located 41 km north of Kyakhta (the district's administrative centre) by road. Subuktuy is the nearest rural locality.
