= Khutor, Republic of Buryatia =

Khutor Хутор
- Selo
- Location within Republic of Buryatia Location within Russia
- Coordinates: 50°01′N 107°19′E
- Country: Russia
- Region: Republic of Buryatia
- District: Kyakhtinsky District
- Time zone: UTC+8:00

Khutor (Russian: Хутор) is a rural locality (a selo) in Kyakhtinsky District, Republic of Buryatia, Russia. The population was 339 as of 2010. There are 5 streets.

== Geography ==
Khutor is located 112 km southeast of Kyakhta (the district's administrative centre) by road. Sharagol is the nearest rural locality.
