= Russo-Chinese Bank =

1895–1910 Russian-French bank in China

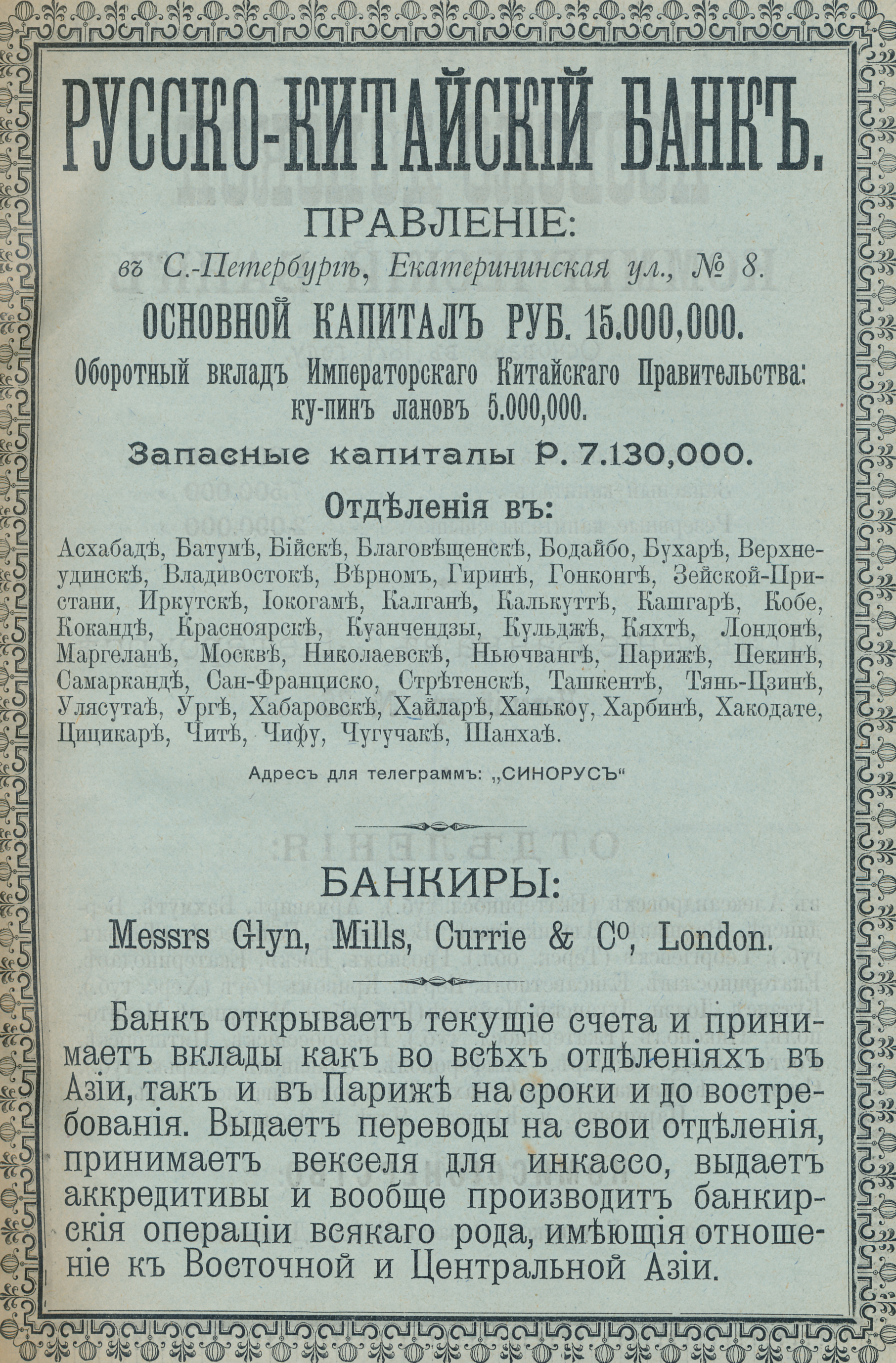
Advert for the Russo-Chinese Bank, 1907

The Russo-Chinese Bank (Russian: Русско-Китайский банк, French: Banque russo-chinoise, Traditional Chinese: 華俄道勝銀行) was a foreign bank, founded in 1895, that represented joint French and Russian interests in China during the late Qing dynasty. It merged in 1910 with the French-sponsored Banque du Nord, a large domestic bank in Russia, to form the Russo-Asiatic Bank.

== History ==
Under the Treaty of Shimonoseki (1895) that ended the First Sino-Japanese War, the Qing empire had to pay a significant indemnity to Japan. French and Russian were involved in the syndication of Chinese government borrowing to raise the indemnity funds, and soon felt the need for a dedicated institution to handle the corresponding loans.

The decision to create the Russo-Chinese Bank was made on 5 December 1895 at the Russian Embassy in Paris, a joint initiative of Russian finance minister Sergei Witte and French diplomat Auguste Gérard. The bank brought together Russian shareholders (for 37.5 percent of the initial capital) and French interests pooled by the Banque de Paris et des Pays-Bas (for 62.5 percent), with participation also from Crédit Lyonnais, the Comptoir national d'escompte de Paris, and Banque Hottinguer. Whereas its board of directors met in Paris, Saint Petersburg was its legal place of incorporation and the seat of its executive management. It opened for business on 21 January 1896 in Saint Petersburg.

The bank immediately opened a branch in Shanghai in February 1896. On 28 August 1896 it partnered with the Chinese imperial government for the construction of the Chinese Eastern Railway, acting as a conduit for project financing from the Russian government, and also receiving capital financing from the Chinese authorities - the only time ever that the Qing empire was involved in the capital of a foreign enterprise. In Chinese, the bank was then referred to as "Sino-Russian Righteousness Victory Bank" (Traditional Chinese: 華俄道勝銀行). By 1902, it had become the second-largest bank in China, and the fifth-largest private-sector bank in the Russian Empire. In 1898, the State Bank of the Russian Empire took a significant share of the bank's newly issued capital. The Russian interests subsequently prevailed in the bank's management, and its French stakeholders were marginalized. The Russo-Chinese Bank's activity had initially been focused north of the Yangtze in order not to compete further south with the French-sponsored Banque de l'Indochine, but the bank breached that arrangement by opening a Hong Kong office in 1904.

In February 1904, the bank opened another branch in San Francisco, its only one in the United States (which was damaged by the April 1906 earthquake). Following the Russo-Japanese War's conclusion in 1905, the bank pared down much of its business in China and was principally active in Northern Manchuria, as well as Central Asia and the Russian Far East. It had to close its branch on the main square of Dalian following the Japanese takeover of the Kwantung Leased Territory. It also suffered from the cotton crises that affected Russian Turkestan from 1904.

By 1907 the bank had 47 branch offices in addition to the Saint Petersburg head office:

- Moscow and Batumi
- Russian Turkestan: Ashgabat, Bukhara, Kokand, Margilan, Samarkand, Tashkent, and Verniy (now Almaty)
- Siberia and Russian Far East: Biysk, Blagoveshchensk, Bodaybo, Chita, Irkutsk, Khabarovsk, Krasnoyarsk, Kyakhta, Nikolayevsk, Sretensk, Verkhneudinsk (now Ulan-Ude), Vladivostok, and Zeya
- Outer Mongolia: Uliastai and Urga (now Ulaanbaatar)
- Chinese Turkestan: Chuguchak (now Tacheng), Ghulja (now Yining) and Kashgar
- Inner Mongolia: Hailar and Kalgan (now Zhangjiakou)
- Manchuria: Harbin, Jilin, Kuancheng (part of Changchun) and Qiqihar
- China proper: Beijing, Zhifu (now Yantai), Hankou (now part of Wuhan), Hong Kong, Niuzhuang (now Yingkou), Shanghai, and Tianjin
- Japan: Hakodate, Kobe and Yokohama
- Calcutta, London, Paris, and San Francisco.

In 1910, the merger with Banque du Nord gave the bank a new impetus, with a major network of branches in Russia, and re-established the influence of French stakeholders in the governance of the merged entity.

== Buildings ==
The headquarters building of the bank in Saint Petersburg, on Ekaterinskaya Street 8, was demolished during the Soviet era.

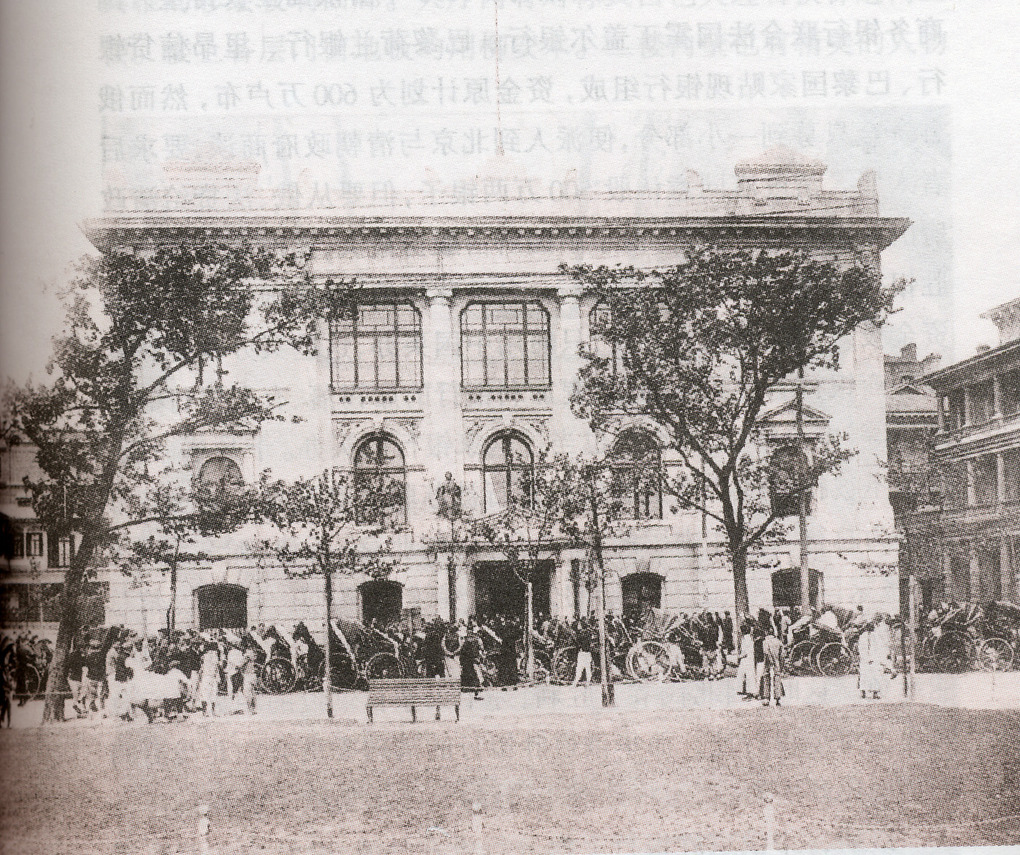
Russo-Chinese Bank Building on No. 15 Bund in Shanghai, completed in 1902

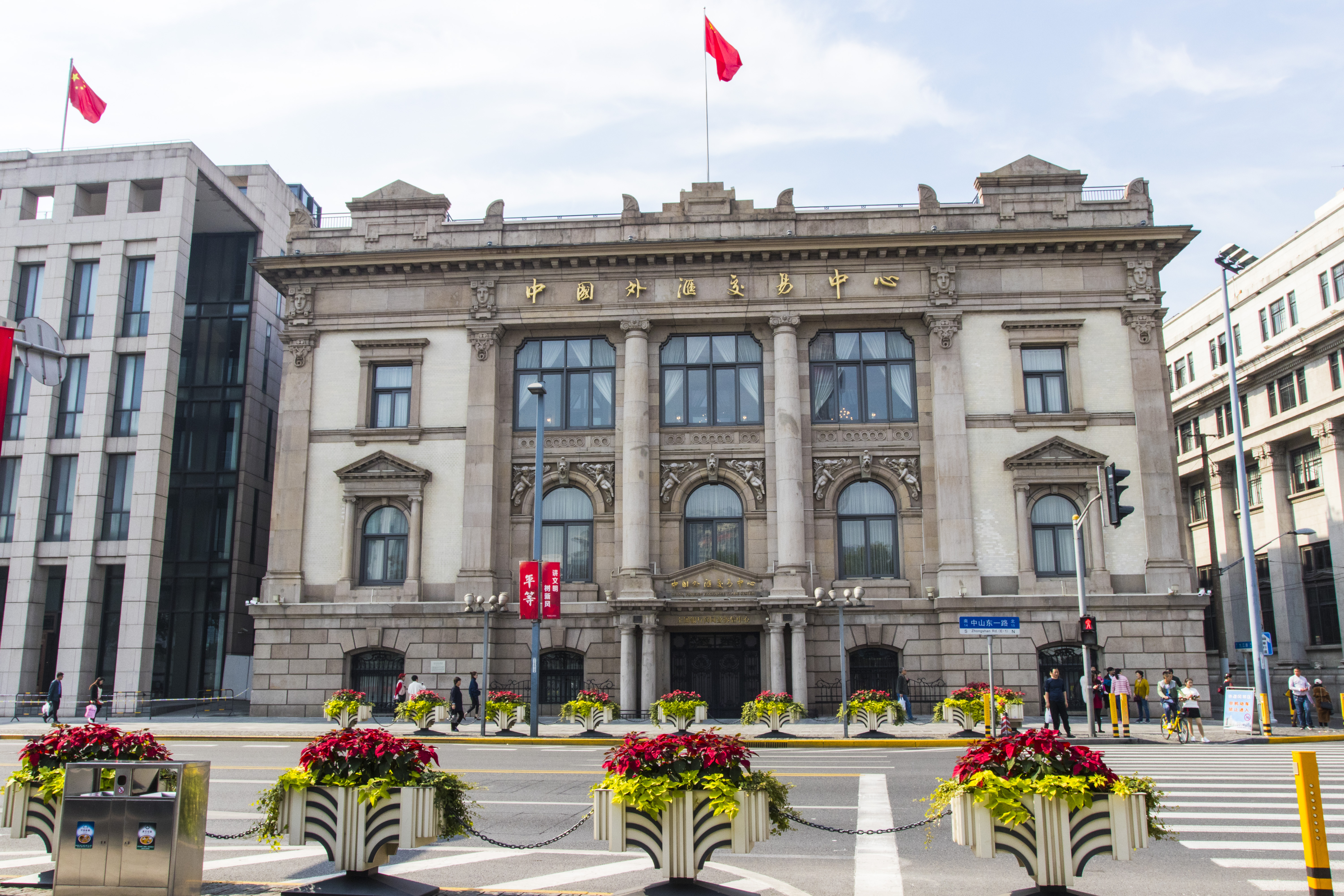
Same building in 2017, seat of the China Foreign Exchange Trade System (CFETS)

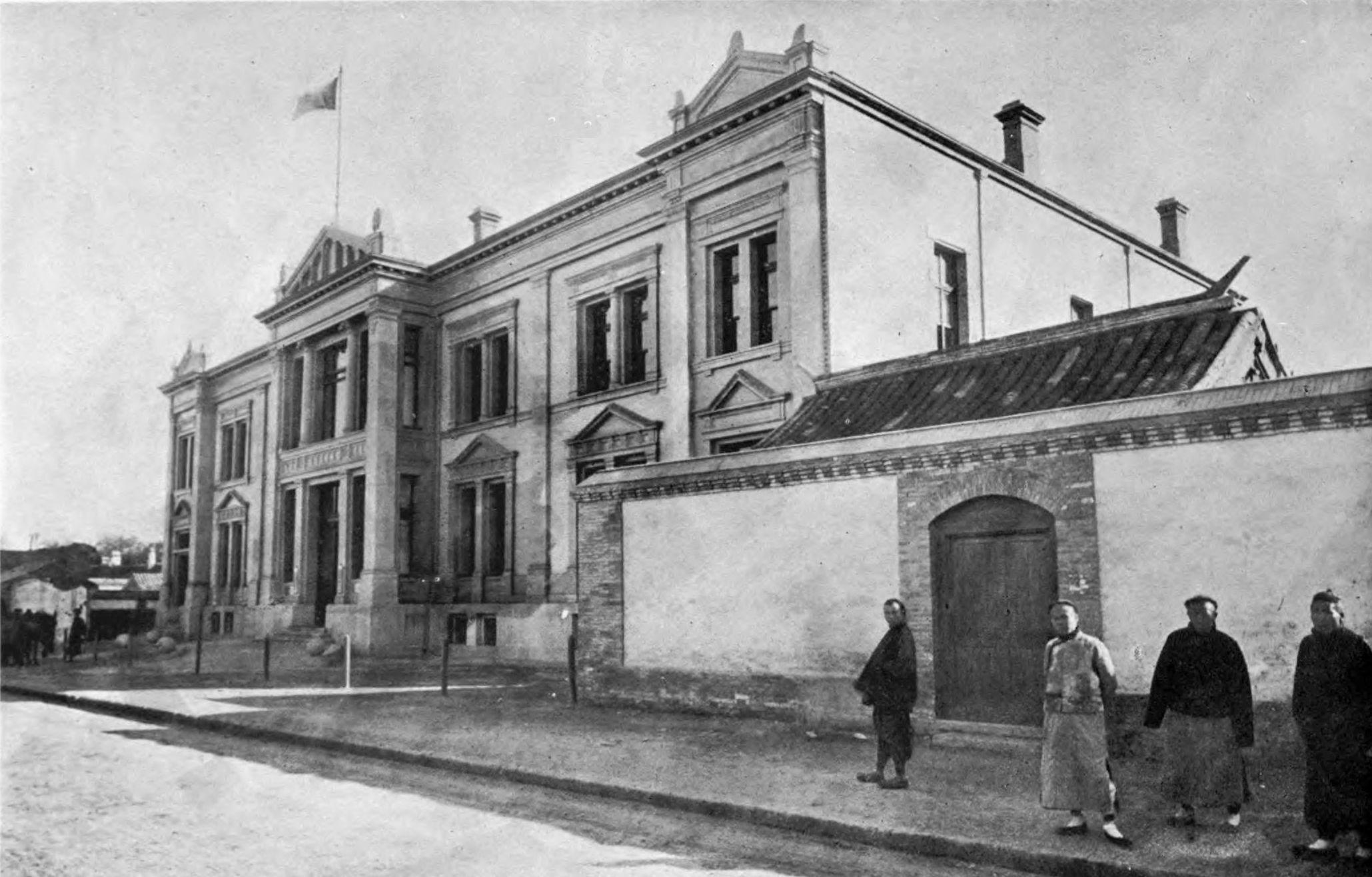
Branch in the Beijing Legation Quarter in 1908; later location of the International Banking Corporation, now Beijing Police Museum

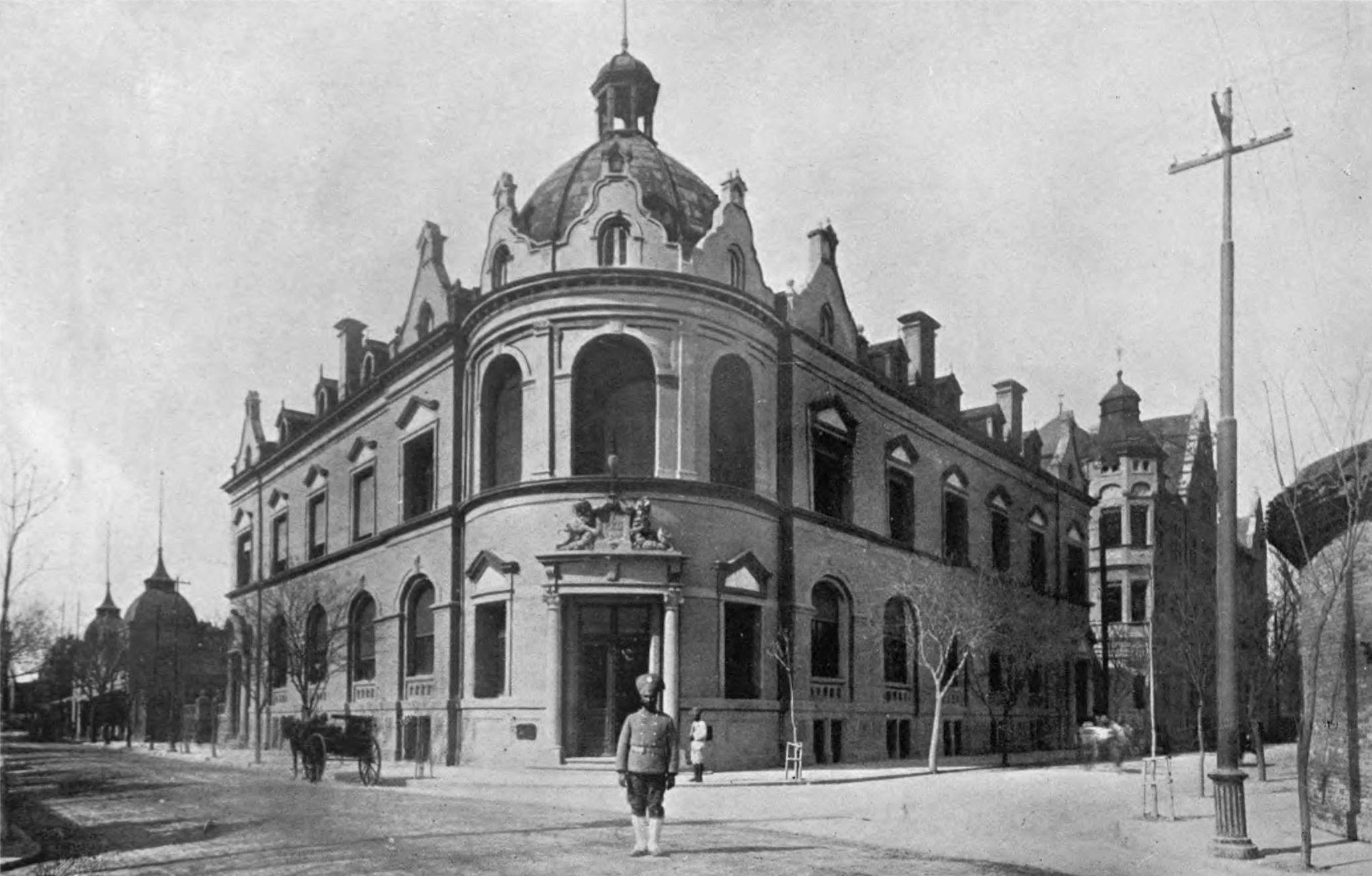
Branch in Tianjin, 1908

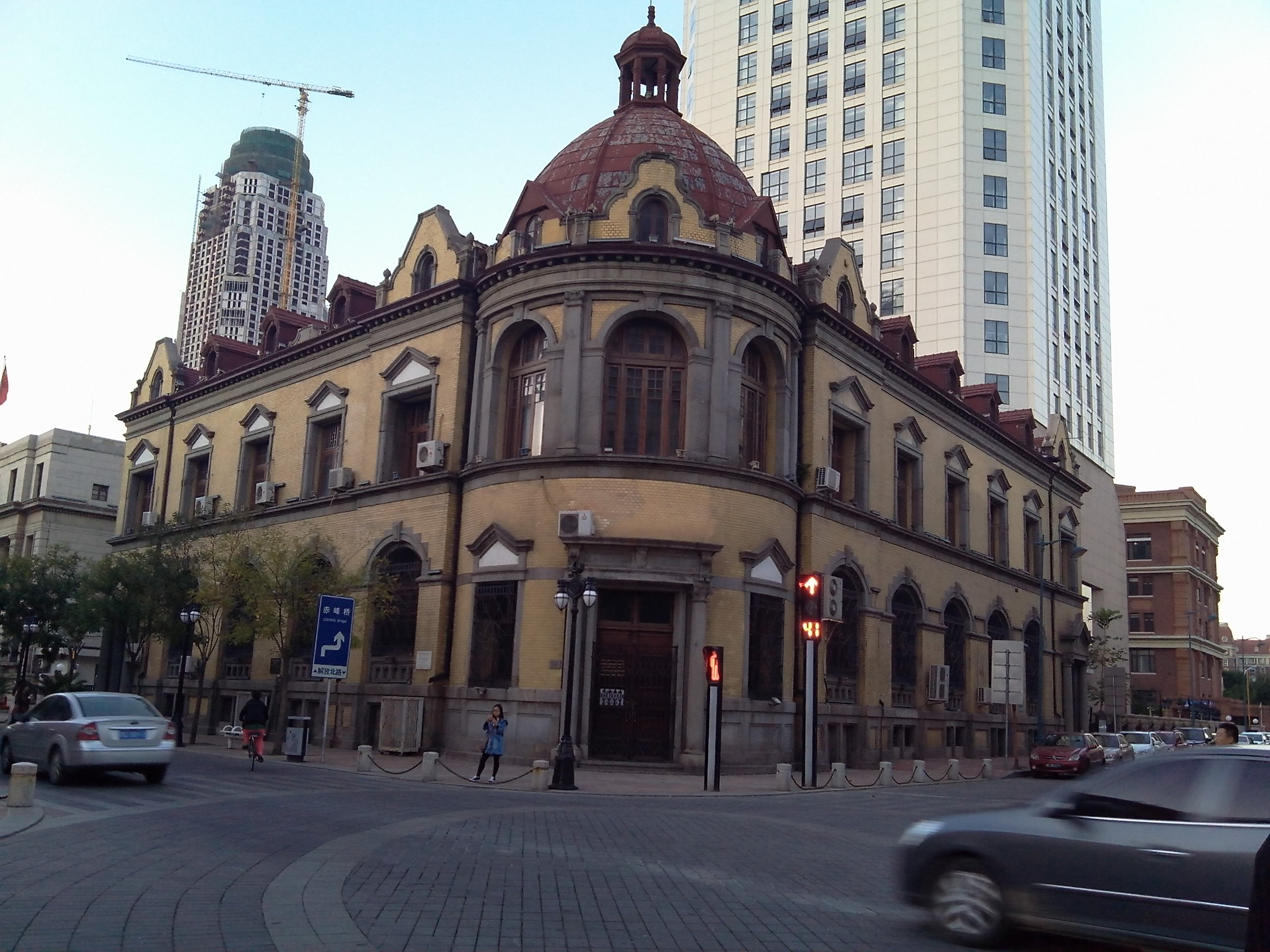
Same building in 2014

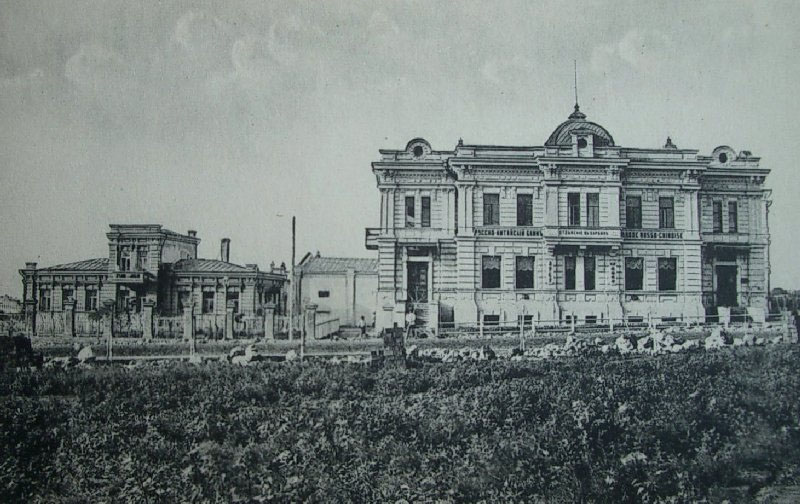
Branch in Harbin, 1900s

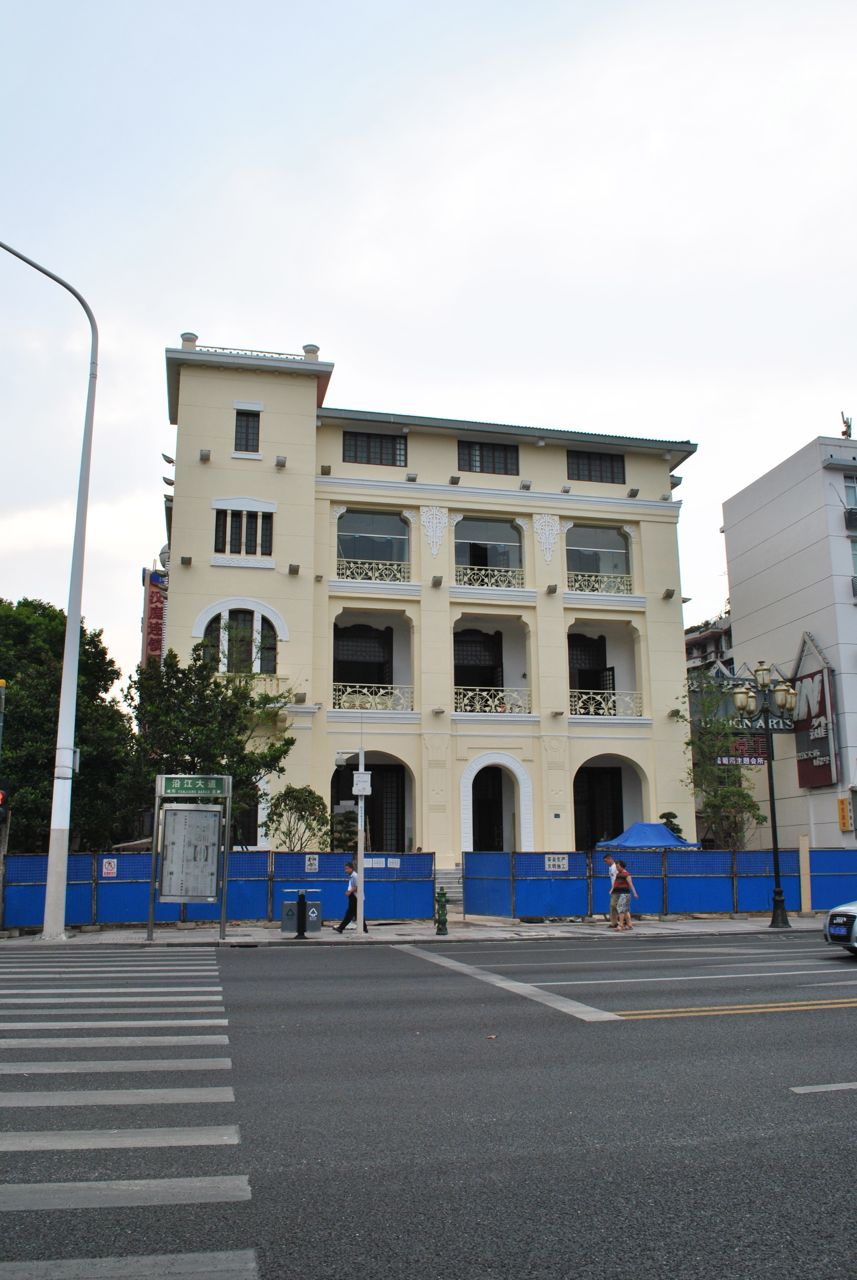
Former branch in Wuhan, 2012

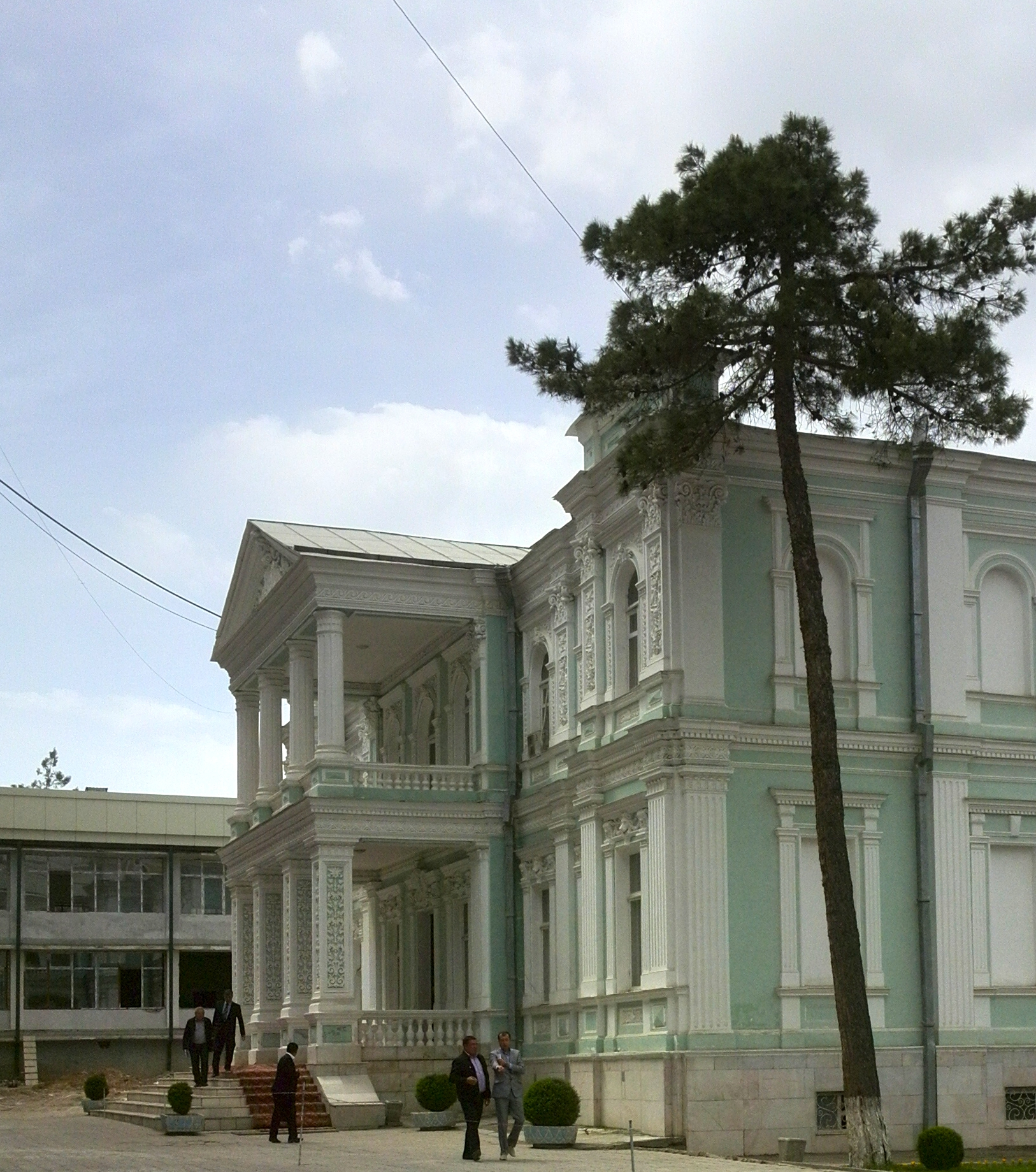
Former branch building in Samarkand, repurposed as office of the rector of Samarkand State University, 2015, now (2025) the location of the "Museum of friendship between Uzbekistan and China"

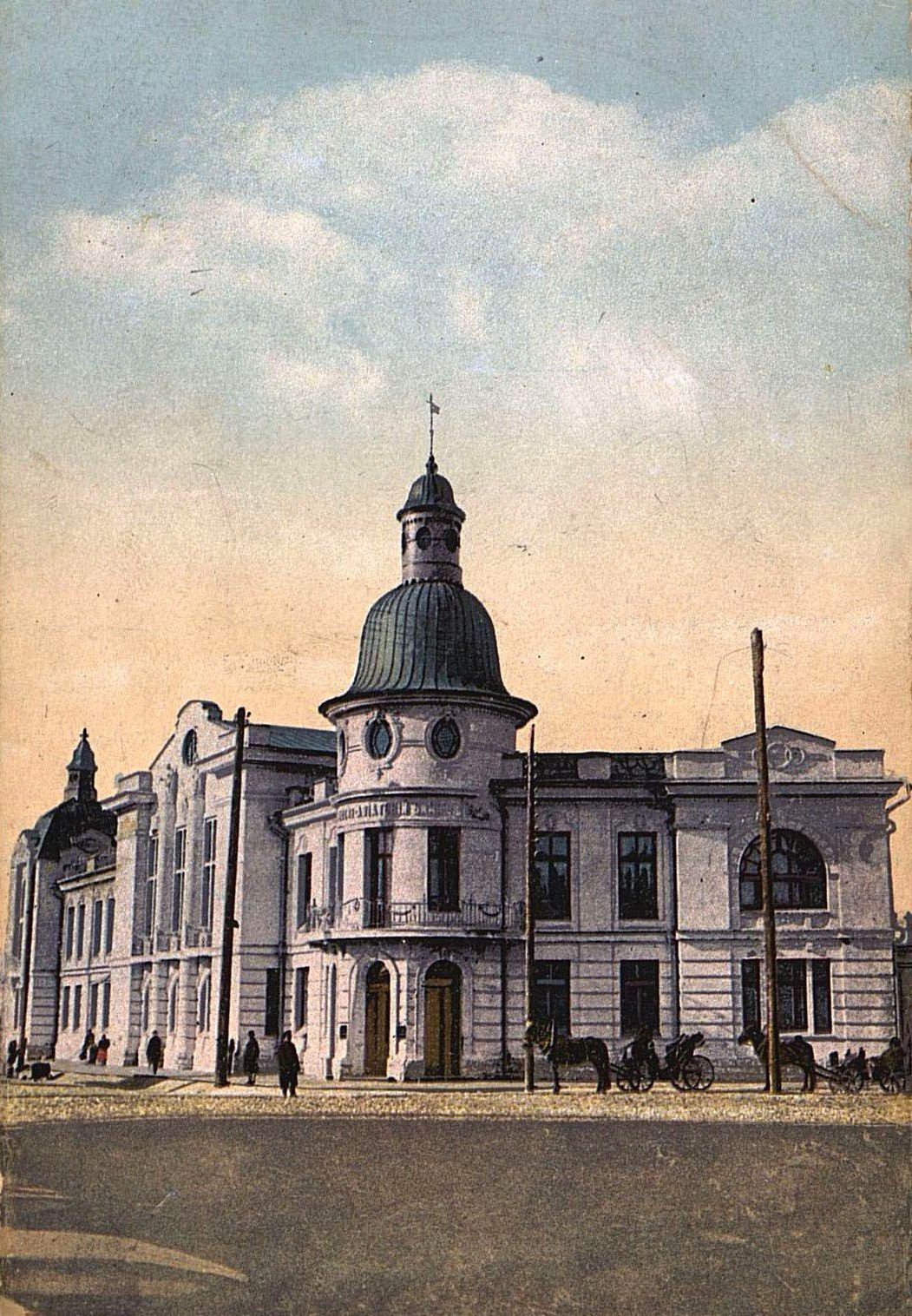
Branch building in Irkutsk, 1900s

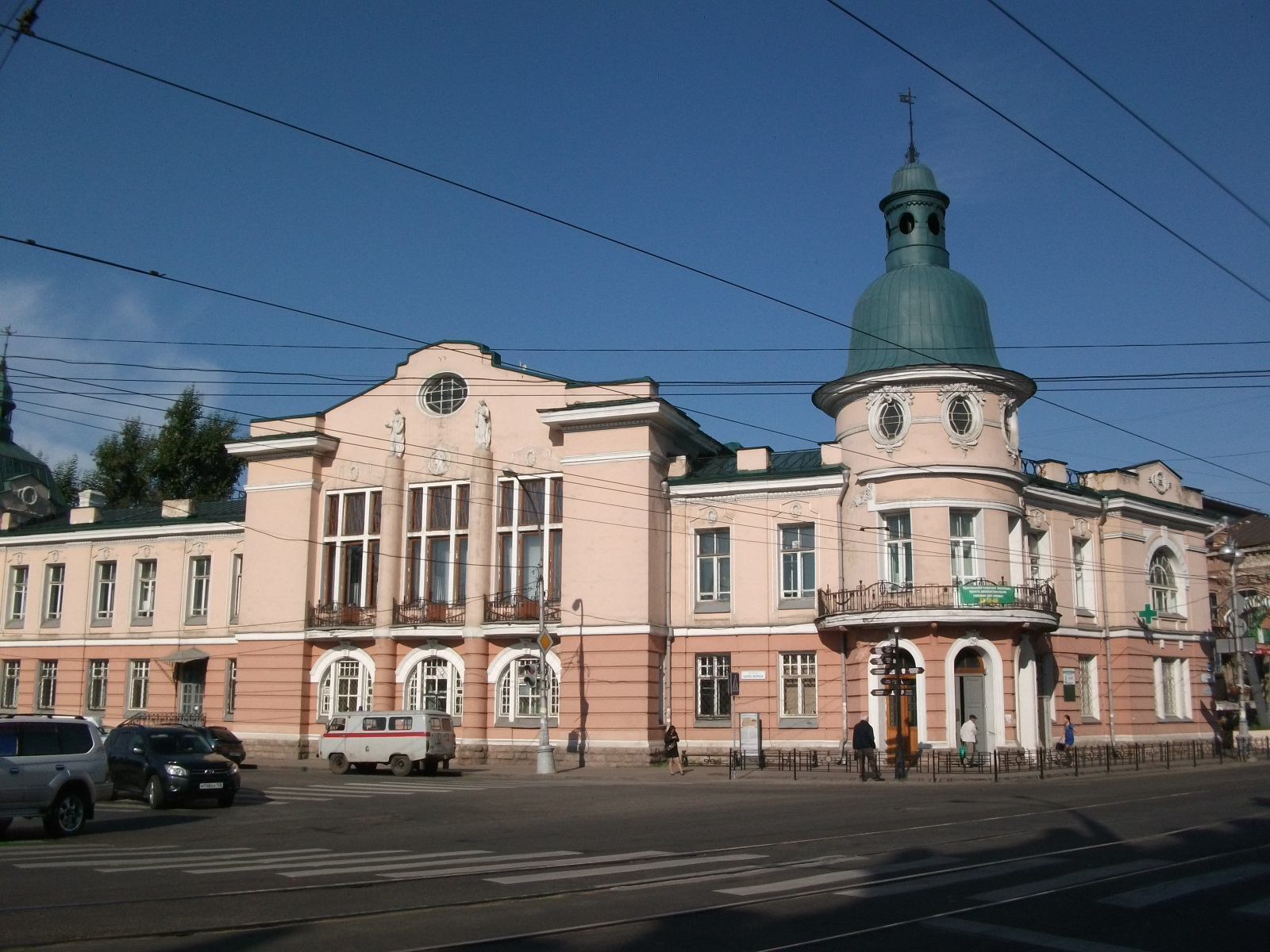
Same building in 2016

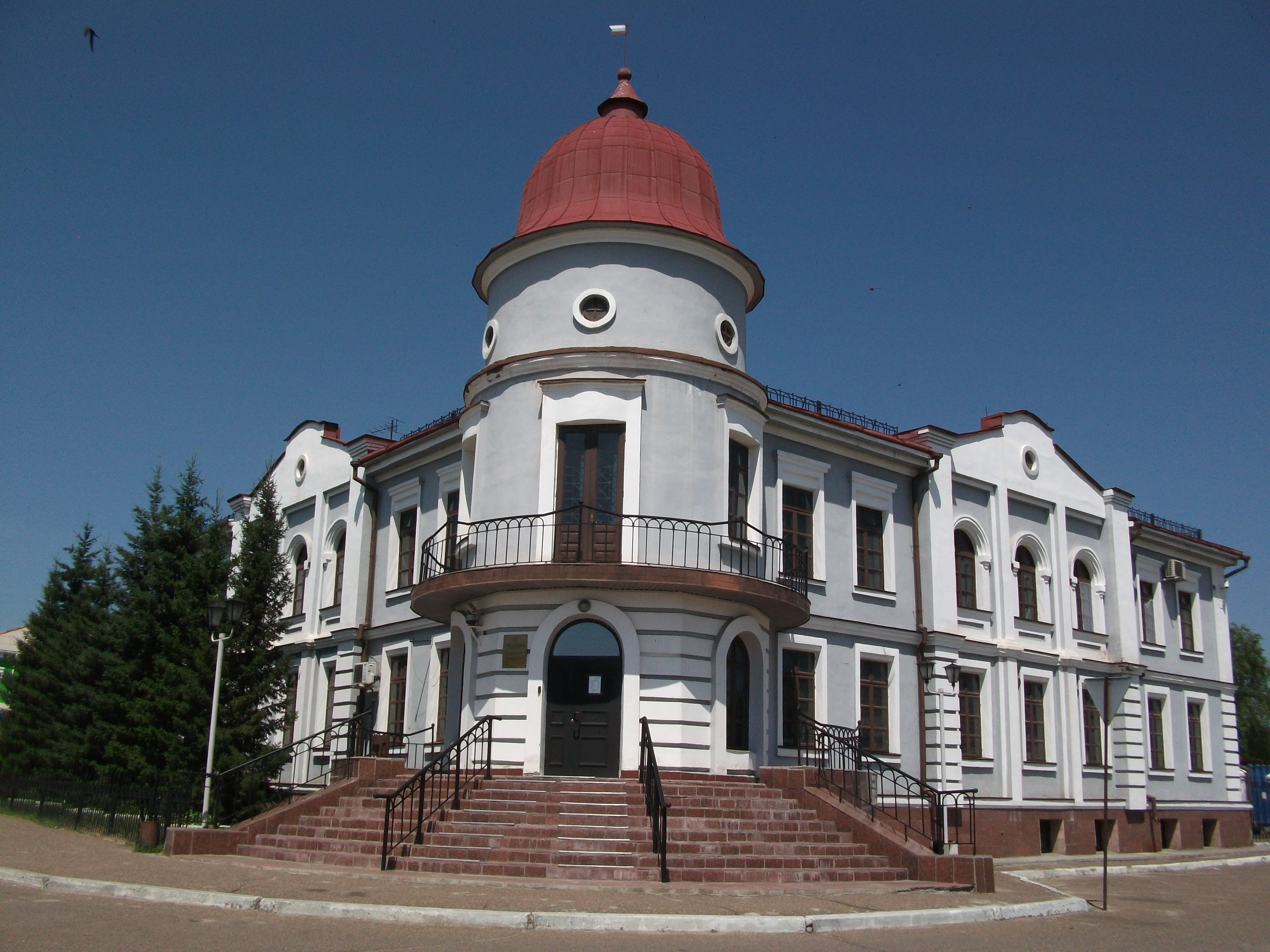
Former branch building in Kyakhta, 2019

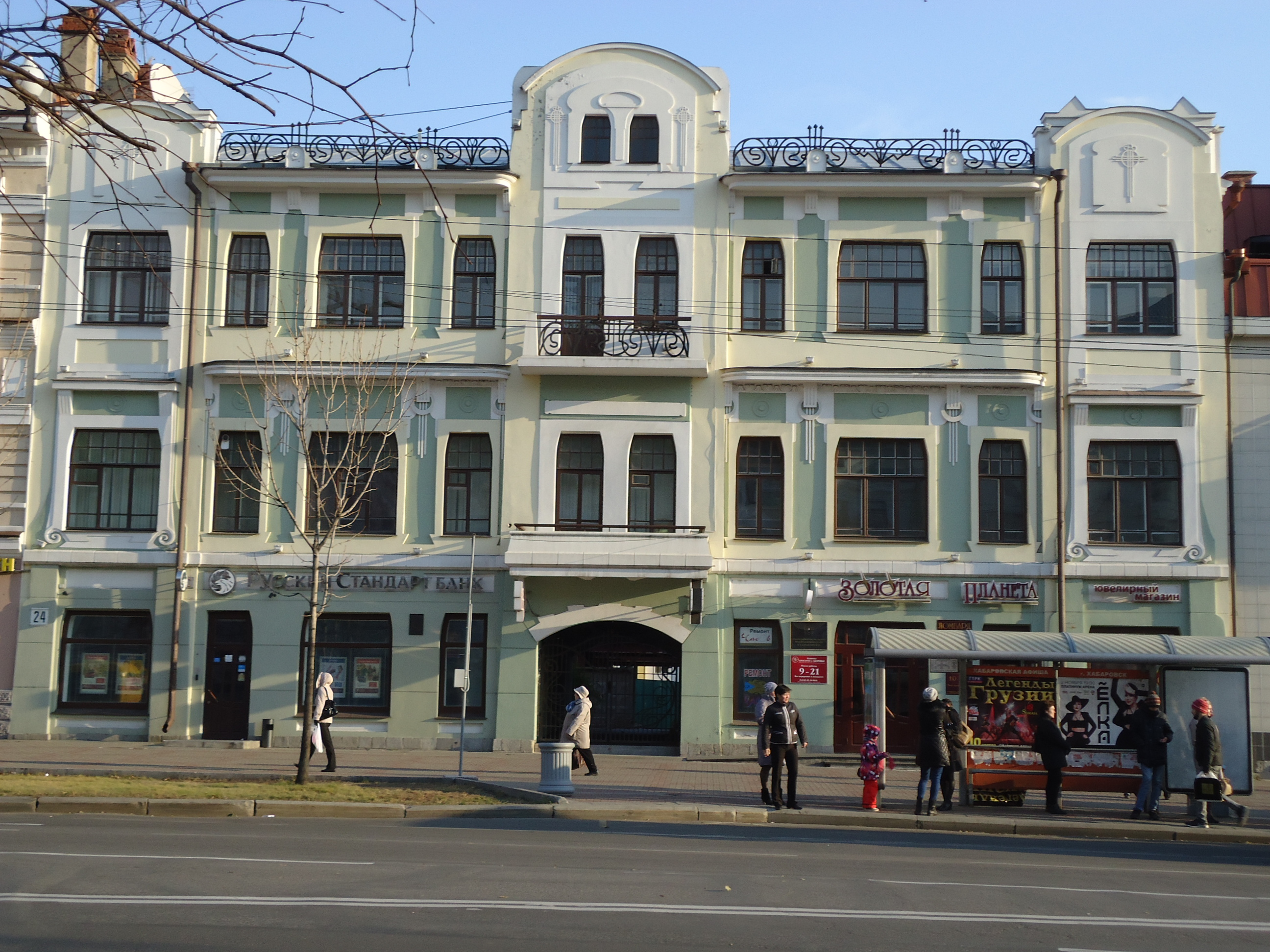
Former branch building in Khabarovsk, 2014

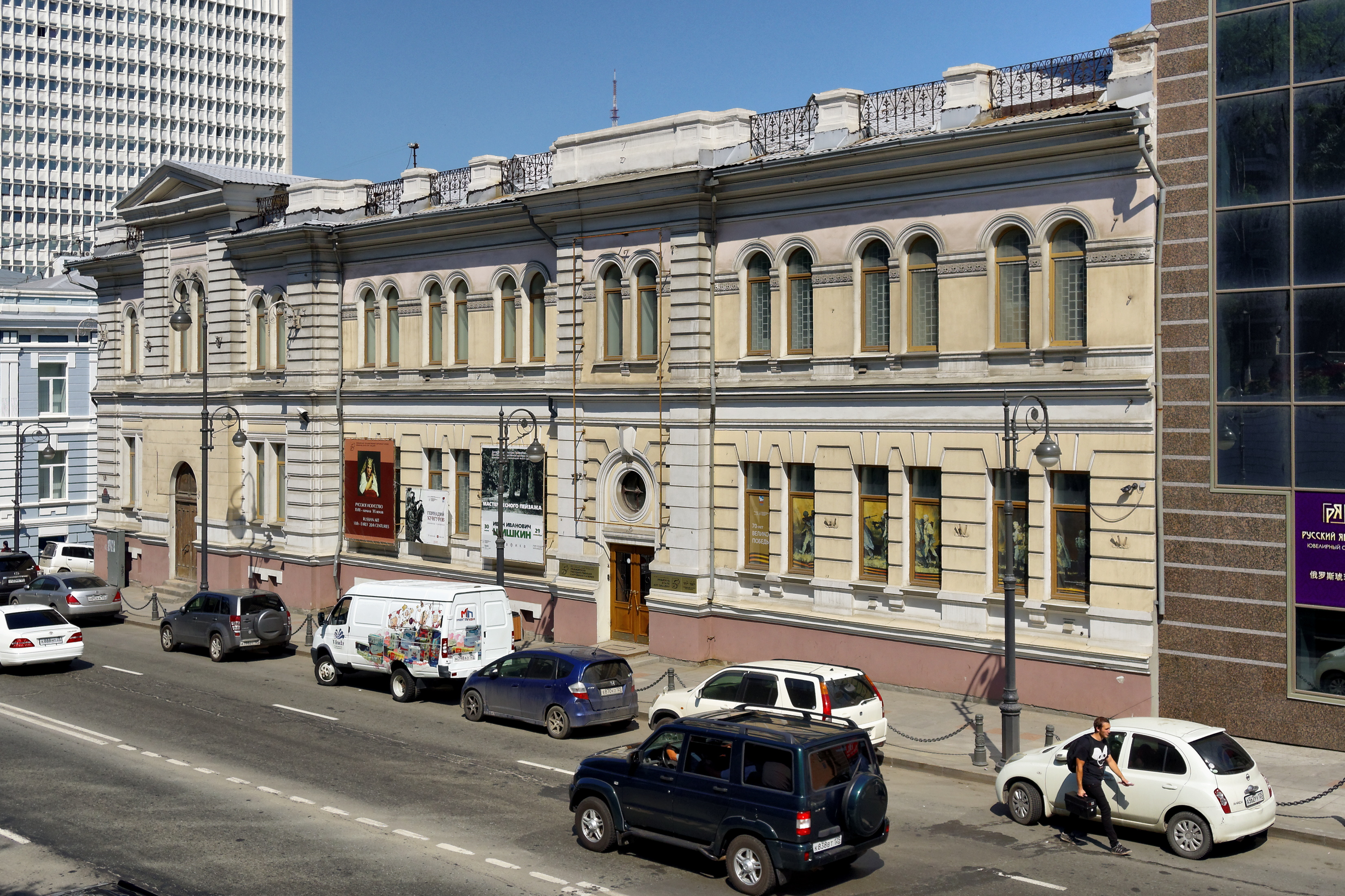
Former branch building in Vladivostok, now Primorye State Art Gallery, 2015

== Banknotes ==
Like other foreign banks in China at the time, the Russo-Chinese Bank issued paper currency in the concessions where it had established branch offices.

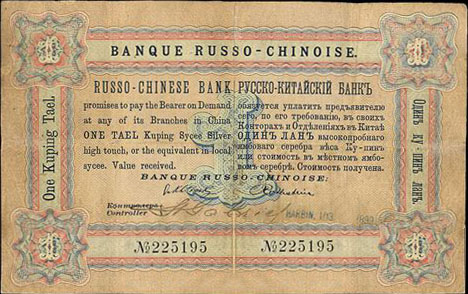
1 tael, all Chinese branches (1898)

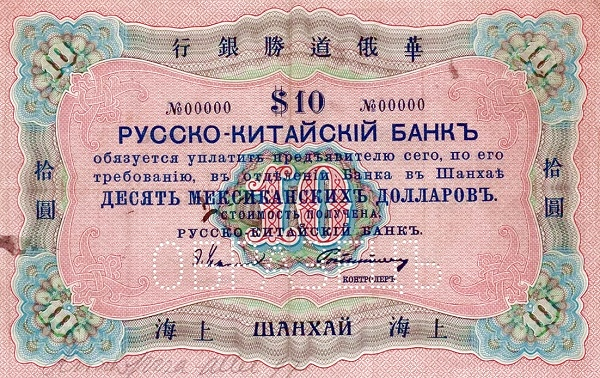
10 Mexican dollars, Shanghai (1901)

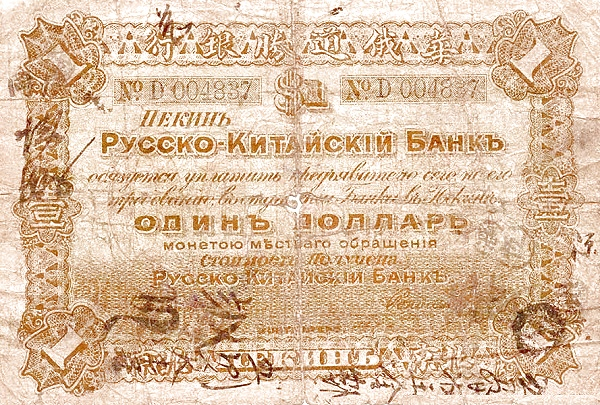
1 dollar local currency, Peking (1903)

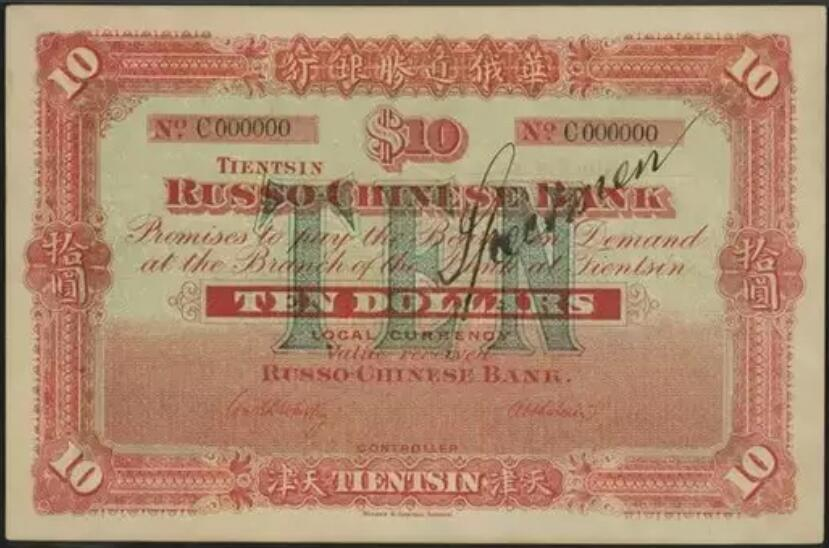
10 dollars local currency, Tianjin (1900s)

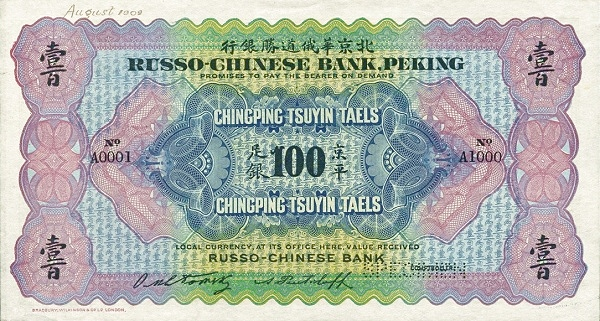
100 taels, Peking (1907)

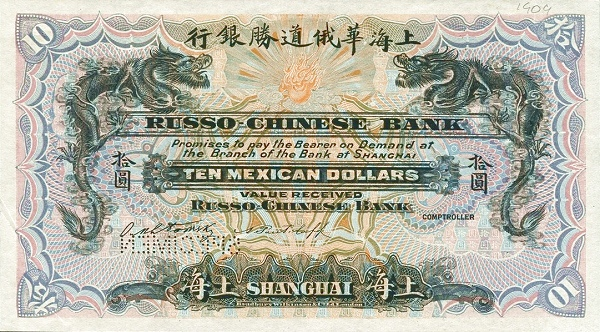
10 Mexican dollars, Shanghai (1909)

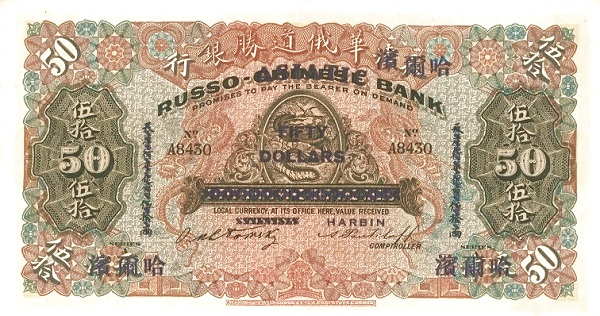
50 dollars local currency, Harbin (stamped Russo-Asiatic Bank)

== See also ==
- Banque de l'Indochine
- Yokohama Specie Bank
- Deutsch-Asiatische Bank
