= Sudzha, Republic of Buryatia =

Sudzha Суджа
- Settlement
- Location within Republic of Buryatia Location within Russia
- Coordinates: 50°28′N 106°24′E
- Country: Russia
- Region: Republic of Buryatia
- District: Kyakhtinsky District
- Time zone: UTC+8:00

Sudzha (Russian: Суджа; Buryat: Һyжаа, Hujaa) is a rural locality (a settlement) in Kyakhtinsky District, Republic of Buryatia, Russia. The population was 16 as of 2010.

== Geography ==
Sudzha is located 66 km east of Kyakhta (the district's administrative centre) by road. Murochi is the nearest rural locality.
