= Russo-Chinese Bank Building =

Building in Shanghai, China

Coordinates: 31.2396°N 121.4853°E

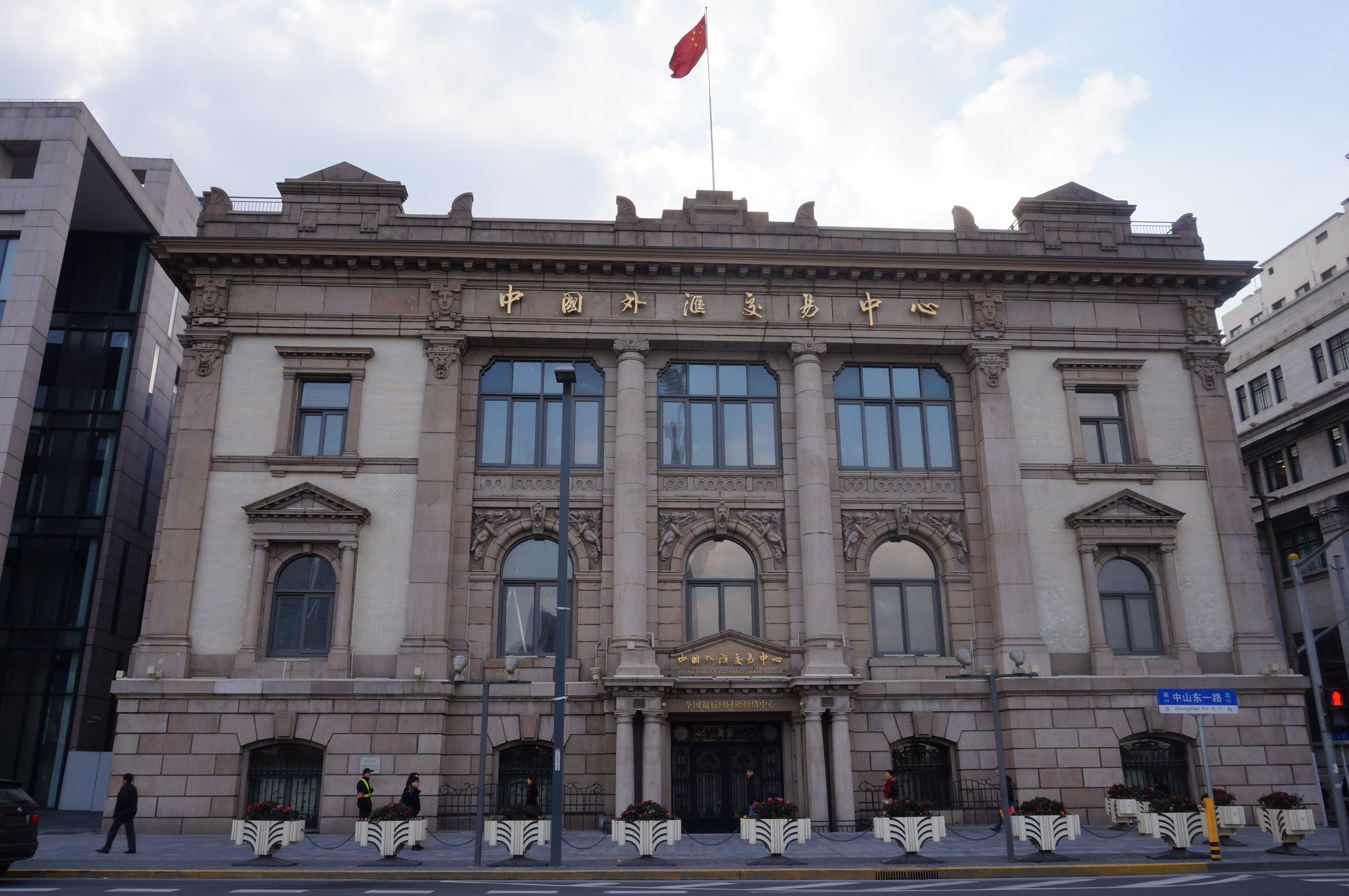
Russo-Chinese Bank Building

The Russo-Chinese Bank Building (Chinese: 华俄道胜银行大楼), later known as the Central Bank Building (Chinese: 中央银行大楼) is a historical building on the Bund in Shanghai, China.

== Location and history ==
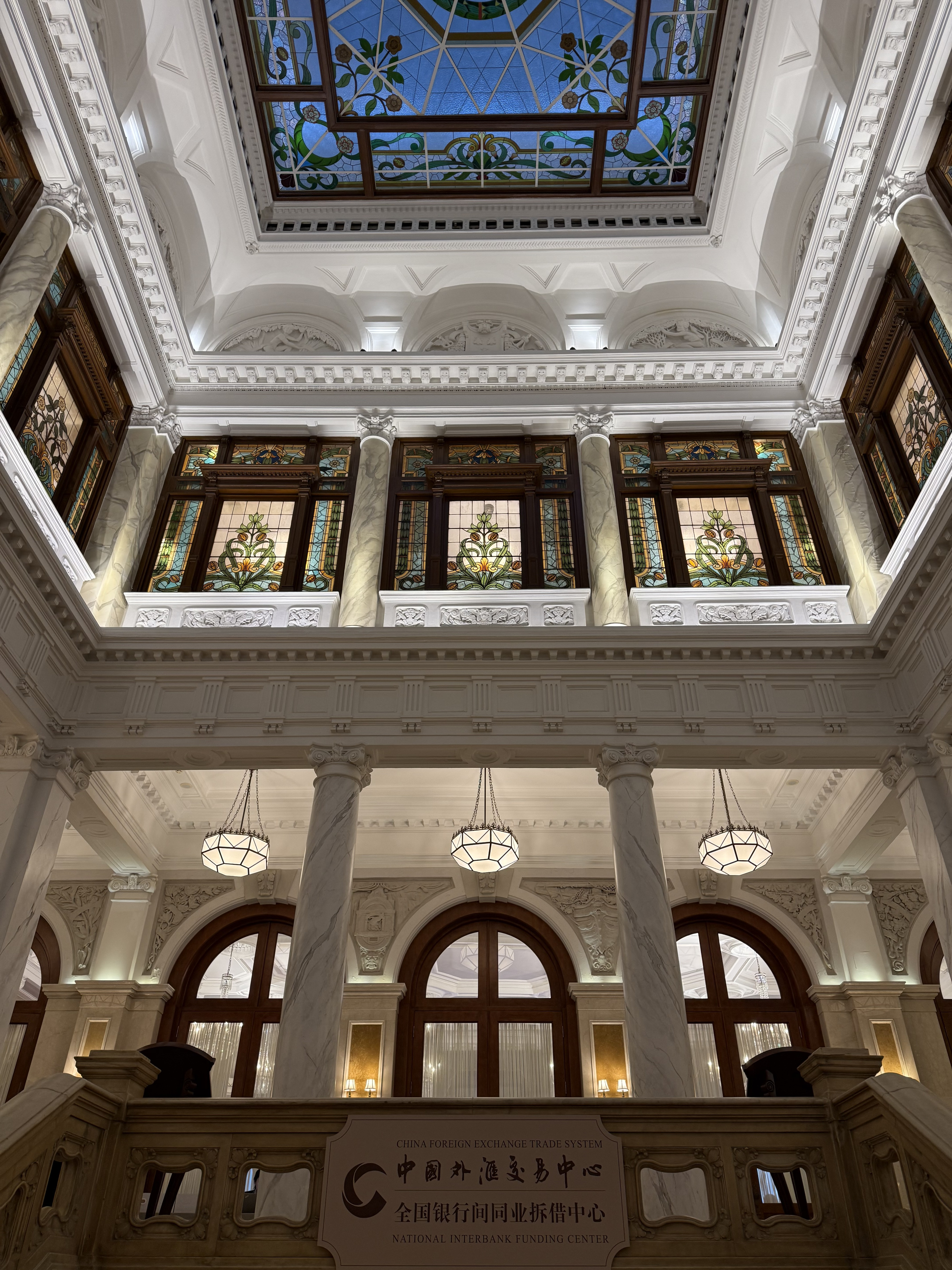
Interior staircase in 2025

The St. Petersburg based Russo-Chinese Bank opened its branch in Shanghai on 13 February 1896 within No. 29 on the Bund, where the Banque de l'Indochine's building (completed in 1914) now stands. In 1899, the bank purchased lot No.15, after its previous owner Dent & Co went bankrupt. The site of a size of 1460 square metres. The present three-storey building on the site was then constructed. The building was designed in Italian Renaissance style by the German architect Heinrich Becker, assisted by Yokohama-based German architect Richard Seel, after winning an open competition for the building's design. The building is of a brick and concrete composite structure and has a floor area of 5018 square metres.

The building was completed and opened on 26 October 1902. It aroused much controversy over the foreign community in Shanghai at the time of its completion as being out of place amidst the other buildings on the bund. Nonetheless, as it turned out, the building was to set the trend for modern European style buildings which would later emerge along the entire waterfront.

The building possessed some of the state-of-the-art equipments available back then. It had its own electric generator and is one of the first buildings in China to be equipped with an elevator. It was fully heated with hot air pipes and every single desk was served by two electric fans and two electric lights.

In 1917, after the Russian Revolution, the bank was nationalized and much of the managers of the bank in Shanghai fled to France. In 1926 the bank went bankrupt and was purchased by the newly founded Central Bank of China and this building become the headquarters of the Central Bank on 1 November 1928. After the establishment of the People's Republic of China, the building was used for numerous other firms and organizations including the Aviation Authority and the Light Industry Bureau of Shanghai.

After 1994, the building became the Shanghai Foreign Exchange Trading Center.
