= Kyakhtinsky District =

Kyakhtinsky District Кяхтинский район (Russian)
- District

Other transcription(s)
  - Buryat: Хяагтын аймаг
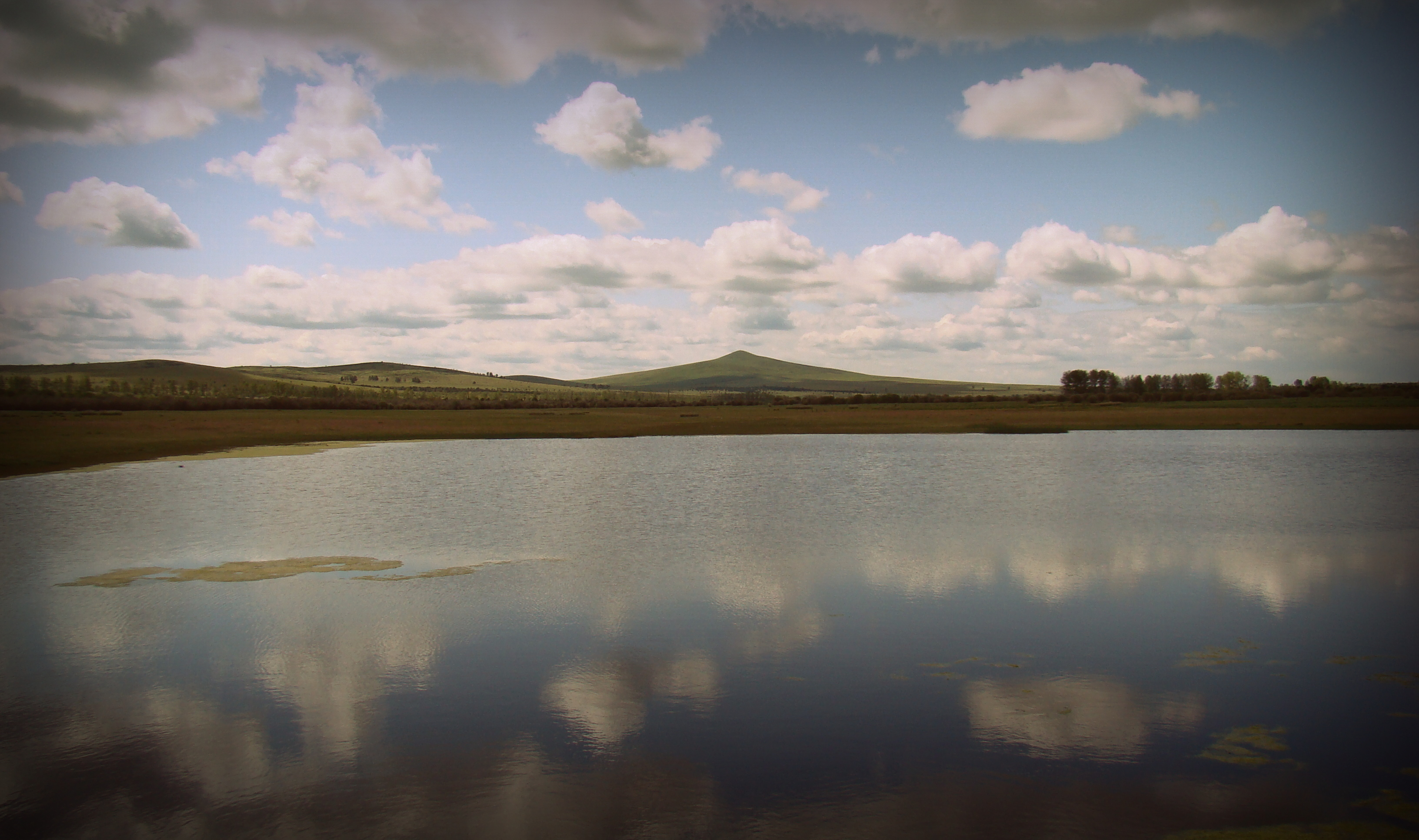
- Lake Kiran in Kyakhtinsky District

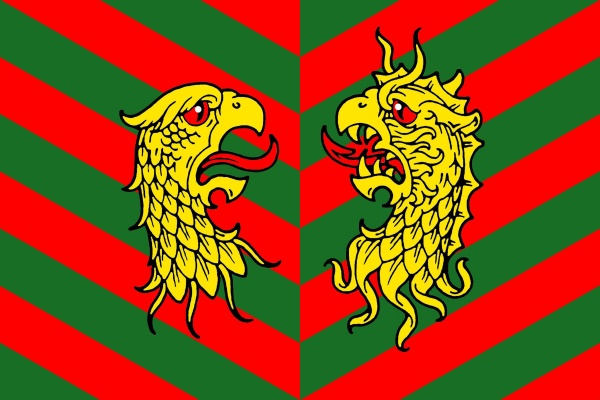
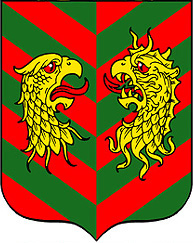
- Flag Coat of arms
- Location of Kyakhtinsky District in the Buryat Republic
- Coordinates: 50°21′N 106°27′E
- Country: Russia
- Federal subject: Republic of Buryatia
- Established: December 12, 1923
- Administrative center: Kyakhta

Area
  - Total: 4,684 km^{2} (1,809 sq mi)

Population (2010 Census)
  - Total: 39,785
  - Density: 8.494/km^{2} (22.00/sq mi)
  - Urban: 58.9%
  - Rural: 41.1%

Administrative structure
  - Administrative divisions: 1 Towns, 1 Urban-type settlements, 8 Selsoviets, 5 Somons
  - Inhabited localities: 1 cities/towns, 1 urban-type settlements, 40 rural localities

Municipal structure
  - Municipally incorporated as: Kyakhtinsky Municipal District
  - Municipal divisions: 2 urban settlements, 15 rural settlements
- Time zone: UTC+8 (MSK+5)
- OKTMO ID: 81633000
- Website: https://admkht.gosuslugi.ru/

Population of Kyakhtinsky District
- 2010 Census: 39,785
- 2002 Census: 40,673
- 1989 Census: 45,224
- 1979 Census: 42,755

Kyakhtinsky District (Russian: Кя́хтинский райо́н, Russian pronunciation: [ˈkʲæxtʲɪnskʲɪj rəˈjon]; Buryat: Хяагтын аймаг, romanized: Khiaagtyn aimag) is an administrative and municipal district (raion), one of the twenty-one in the Republic of Buryatia, Russia. It is located in the south of the republic. The area of the district is 4,684 square kilometers (1,809 sq mi). Its administrative center is the town of Kyakhta. As of the 2010 Census, the total population of the district was 39,785, with the population of Kyakhta accounting for 50.3% of that number.

== Geography ==
The district is located in southern Buryatia, near the Mongolia–Russia border, in the geographical region of the Selenga Highlands.

== History ==
The district was established on December 12, 1923.

== Administrative and municipal status ==
Within the framework of administrative divisions, Kyakhtinsky District is one of the twenty-one in the Republic of Buryatia. It is divided into one town (an administrative division with the administrative center in the town (an inhabited locality) of Kyakhta), one urban-type settlement (an administrative division with the administrative center in the urban-type settlement (inhabited locality) of Naushki), eight selsoviets, and five somons, all of which comprise forty rural localities. As a municipal division, the district is incorporated as Kyakhtinsky Municipal District. The town (together with one rural locality—the settlement of Sudzha) and the urban-type settlement are incorporated as two urban settlements, and the eight selsoviets and five somons are incorporated as fifteen rural settlements within the municipal district. The town of Kyakhta serves as the administrative center of both the administrative and municipal district.
