= Kyakhta =

Town in the Republic of Buryatia, Russia

Kyakhta Кяхта
- Town

Other transcription(s)
  - Buryat: Хяагта
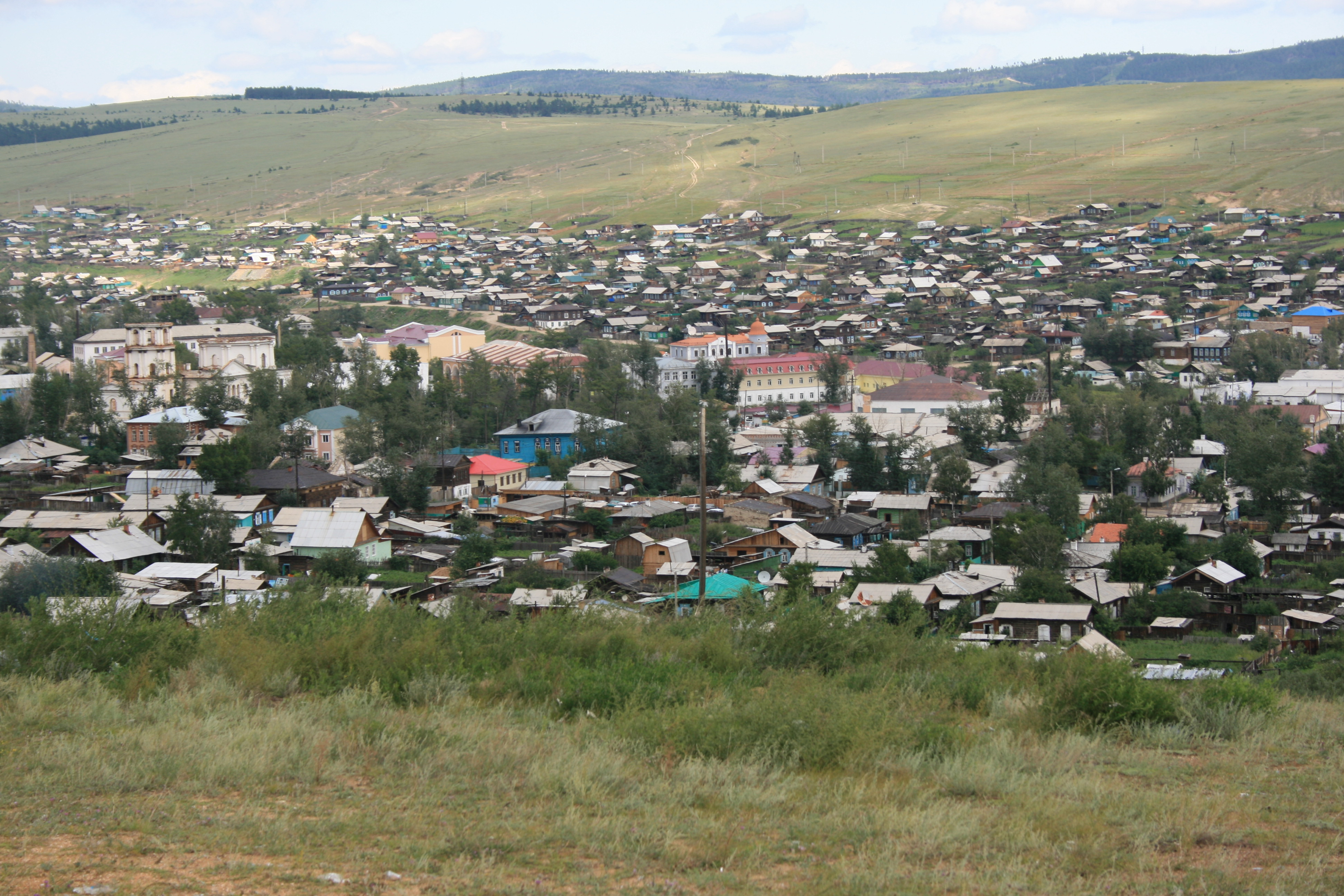
- View of the town

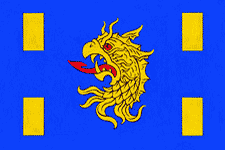
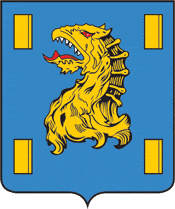
- Flag Coat of arms
- Interactive map of Kyakhta
- Location of Kyakhta Kyakhta (Republic of Buryatia)
- Coordinates: 50°21′00″N 106°27′00″E
- Country: Russia
- Federal subject: Buryatia
- Administrative district: Kyakhtinsky District
- TownSelsoviet: Kyakhta
- Founded: 1728
- Town status since: 1805

Government
  - Mayor: Valery Tsyrempilov
- Elevation: 760 m (2,490 ft)

Population (2010 Census)
  - Total: 20,024
  - Estimate (2025): 17,758 (−11.3%)

Administrative status
  - Capital of: Kyakhtinsky District, Town of Kyakhta

Municipal status
  - Municipal district: Kyakhtinsky Municipal District
  - Urban settlement: Kyakhta Urban Settlement
  - Capital of: Kyakhtinsky Municipal District, Kyakhta Urban Settlement
- Time zone: UTC+8 (MSK+5)
- Postal codes: 671840, 671842, 671843
- Dialing code: +7 30142
- OKTMO ID: 81633101001

Kyakhta (Russian: Кя́хта, [ˈkʲaxtə]; Buryat: Хяагта, romanized: Khiaagta, [ˈçæːχtə]; Mongolian: Хиагт, romanized: Hiagt, [ˈçæχtʰ]) is a town and the administrative center of Kyakhtinsky District in the Republic of Buryatia, Russia, located on the Kyakhta River near the Mongolia–Russia border. The town stands directly opposite the Mongolian border town of Altanbulag. Population: 20,041 (2010 census); 18,391 (2002 census); 18,307 (1989 Soviet census). From 1727 it was the border crossing for the Kyakhta trade between Russia and China.

== Etymology ==
The Buryat name means place covered with couch grass, and is derived from Mongolian word хиаг, meaning couch grass.

== Geography ==
The region where Kyakhta stands is advantageous for Russo-Chinese trade. The Siberian River Routes connect the fur-bearing lands of Siberia to Lake Baikal. From there, the Selenga River valley is the natural route through the Selenga Highlands southeast of Lake Baikal out onto the plains of Mongolia.

== History ==
Kyakhta was founded in 1727 soon after the Treaty of Kyakhta was negotiated near Selenginsk north of Kyakhta. It was the starting point of the boundary markers that defined what is now the northern border of Mongolia. Kyakhta's founder, the Serb Sava Vladislavich, established it as a trading point between Russia and the Qing Empire. "He gave instructions to build the Troitskosavsky Fortress at the place of Barsukov winter camp. A church was erected inside the wooden fortress. The church gave the name both to the Troitskaya (Trinity) Fortress and to the future town of Troitskosavsk. This is what the town was called until 1734 when it was merged with the trading settlement of Kyakhta and renamed Troitskosavsk-Kyakhta. In 1934, the name was shortened to Kyakhta." Other sources have Troitskosavsk as a fort a short distance north, Troitskosavsk being the administrative and military center while Kyakhta was the trading post on the border. The Manchus built Maimaicheng just south of Kyakhta on their side of the border. Before 1762, state caravans traveled from Kyakhta to Peking. After that date, trade was mostly by barter at Kyakhta-Maimaicheng, with merchants crossing the border to make their business.

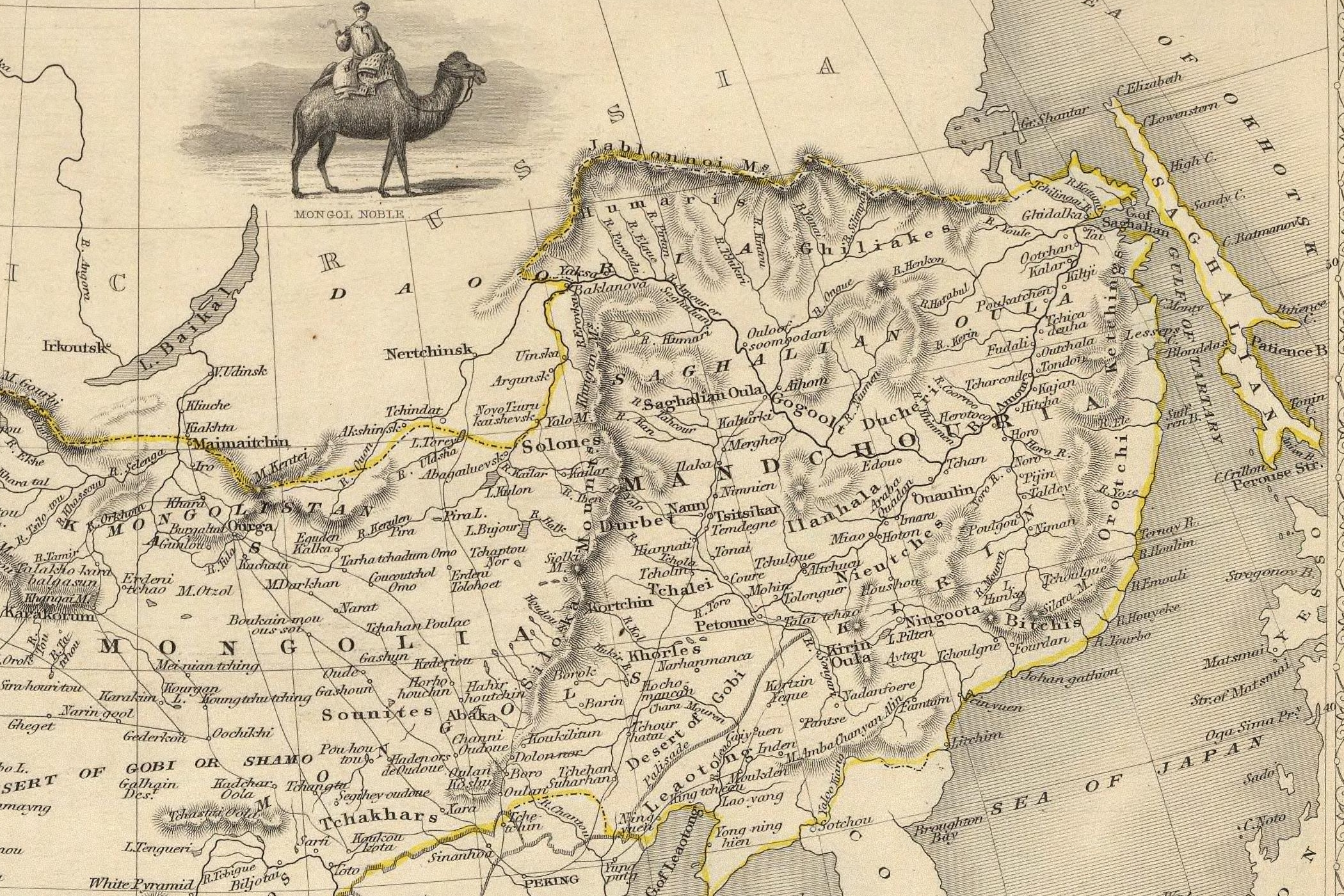
The twin towns of Kyakhta and Maimaicheng can be seen on this 1851 map, on the shortest route from Irkutsk to Peking

Kyakhta and Maimaicheng were visited by the famous English adventurer and engineer Samuel Bentham in 1782. He related that he was entertained by the commander of the Chinese city "with the greatest politeness which a stranger can meet with in any country whatever". At that time, the Russians sold furs, textiles, clothing, hides, leather, hardware, and cattle, while the Chinese sold silk, cotton stuffs, teas, fruits, porcelain, rice, candles, rhubarb, ginger, and musk. Much of the tea is said to have come from Yangloudong, a major center of tea production and trade near today's Chibi City, Hubei.

Kyakhta was crowded, unclean, ill-planned, and never came to reflect the wealth that flowed through it, although several Neoclassical buildings were erected in the 19th century, including a tea bourse (1842) and the Orthodox cathedral (1807–1817), both of which still stand. In 1996 the Voskreskenskaya church was being used as a stable. It was from Kyakhta that Nikolay Przhevalsky, Grigory Potanin, Pyotr Kozlov, and Vladimir Obruchev set off on their expeditions into the interior of Mongolia and Xinjiang.

Town status was granted to Kyakhta in 1805.

After the entire Russian-Chinese frontier was opened to trade in 1860 and the Trans-Siberian and the Chinese Eastern Railways bypassed it, Kyakhta fell into decline. In the mid-20th century, a branch railway was built from Ulan-Ude (on the Trans-Siberian) to Mongolia's Ulaanbaatar, and, eventually, to China, paralleling the old Kyakhta trade route. However, this railway crosses the Russian-Mongolian border not in Kyakhta itself, but in nearby Naushki.

=== Kyakhta Pidgin ===
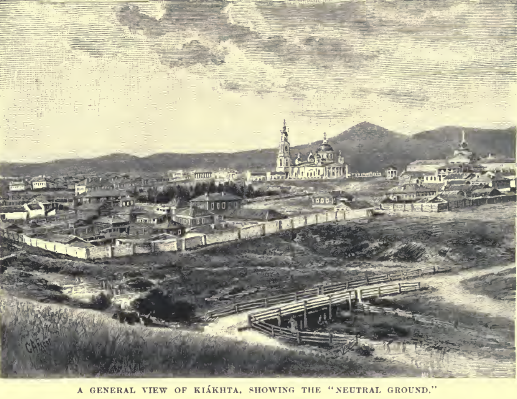
Kyakhta, 1885

As the first market town on the border between the Russian and Chinese Empires, Kyakhta gave its name to the so-called Kyakhta Russian–Chinese Pidgin, a contact language that was used by Russian and Chinese traders to communicate.

== Administrative and municipal status ==
Within the framework of administrative divisions, Kyakhta serves as the administrative center of Kyakhtinsky District. As an administrative division, it is, together with one rural locality (the settlement of Sudzha), incorporated within Kyakhtinsky District as the Town of Kyakhta. As a municipal division, the Town of Kyakhta is incorporated within Kyakhtinsky Municipal District as Kyakhta Urban Settlement.

== Economy ==
Kyakhta's economy today relies mainly on its status as an important center for trade between Russia, China, and Mongolia, located on the highway from the republic's capital of Ulan-Ude to the Mongolian capital of Ulaanbaatar. It also has textile, lumber, and food-processing plants.

== Culture ==
Kyakhta is home to the Damdin Sükhbaatar memorial museum.

== Climate ==
Kyakhta has a humid continental climate (Köppen climate classification Dwb) with dry, severely cold winters and warm, moist summers.

Climate data for Kyakhta (1991–2020 normals)
Month	Jan	Feb	Mar	Apr	May	Jun	Jul	Aug	Sep	Oct	Nov	Dec	Year
Record high °C (°F)	−0.1 (31.8)	8.6 (47.5)	20.5 (68.9)	30.6 (87.1)	35.0 (95.0)	39.3 (102.7)	40.6 (105.1)	37.1 (98.8)	31.6 (88.9)	26.6 (79.9)	12.8 (55.0)	5.4 (41.7)	40.6 (105.1)
Mean daily maximum °C (°F)	−15.0 (5.0)	−9.0 (15.8)	1.1 (34.0)	11.2 (52.2)	18.6 (65.5)	24.8 (76.6)	26.4 (79.5)	23.7 (74.7)	16.9 (62.4)	7.7 (45.9)	−3.9 (25.0)	−12.6 (9.3)	7.5 (45.5)
Daily mean °C (°F)	−20.1 (−4.2)	−15.1 (4.8)	−5.6 (21.9)	3.8 (38.8)	10.9 (51.6)	17.5 (63.5)	19.9 (67.8)	17.1 (62.8)	10.0 (50.0)	1.3 (34.3)	−9.2 (15.4)	−17.6 (0.3)	1.1 (33.9)
Mean daily minimum °C (°F)	−24.5 (−12.1)	−20.4 (−4.7)	−11.5 (11.3)	−2.6 (27.3)	3.9 (39.0)	10.9 (51.6)	14.0 (57.2)	11.6 (52.9)	4.5 (40.1)	−3.8 (25.2)	−13.9 (7.0)	−21.7 (−7.1)	−4.5 (24.0)
Record low °C (°F)	−55.2 (−67.4)	−49.1 (−56.4)	−39.7 (−39.5)	−24.8 (−12.6)	−12.1 (10.2)	−4.5 (23.9)	1.4 (34.5)	−2.7 (27.1)	−9.7 (14.5)	−26.8 (−16.2)	−34.7 (−30.5)	−42.1 (−43.8)	−55.2 (−67.4)
Average precipitation mm (inches)	4 (0.2)	3 (0.1)	4 (0.2)	11 (0.4)	35 (1.4)	66 (2.6)	89 (3.5)	74 (2.9)	39 (1.5)	11 (0.4)	7 (0.3)	5 (0.2)	348 (13.7)
Average precipitation days (≥ 0.1 mm)	10.7	6.3	7.2	7.8	10.7	10.4	11.9	12.1	9.6	8.0	8.3	9.4	112.4
Average relative humidity (%)	79.1	73.9	65.8	53.0	53.0	58.7	64.1	68.0	66.5	68.0	73.9	79.1	66.9
Mean monthly sunshine hours	158.1	187.6	235.6	243.0	275.9	276.0	279.0	254.2	234.0	186.0	153.0	127.1	2,609.5
Source 1: Pogoda.ru.net
Source 2: climatebase.ru (precipitation days, humidity and sunshine hours)

== Town name in other languages ==
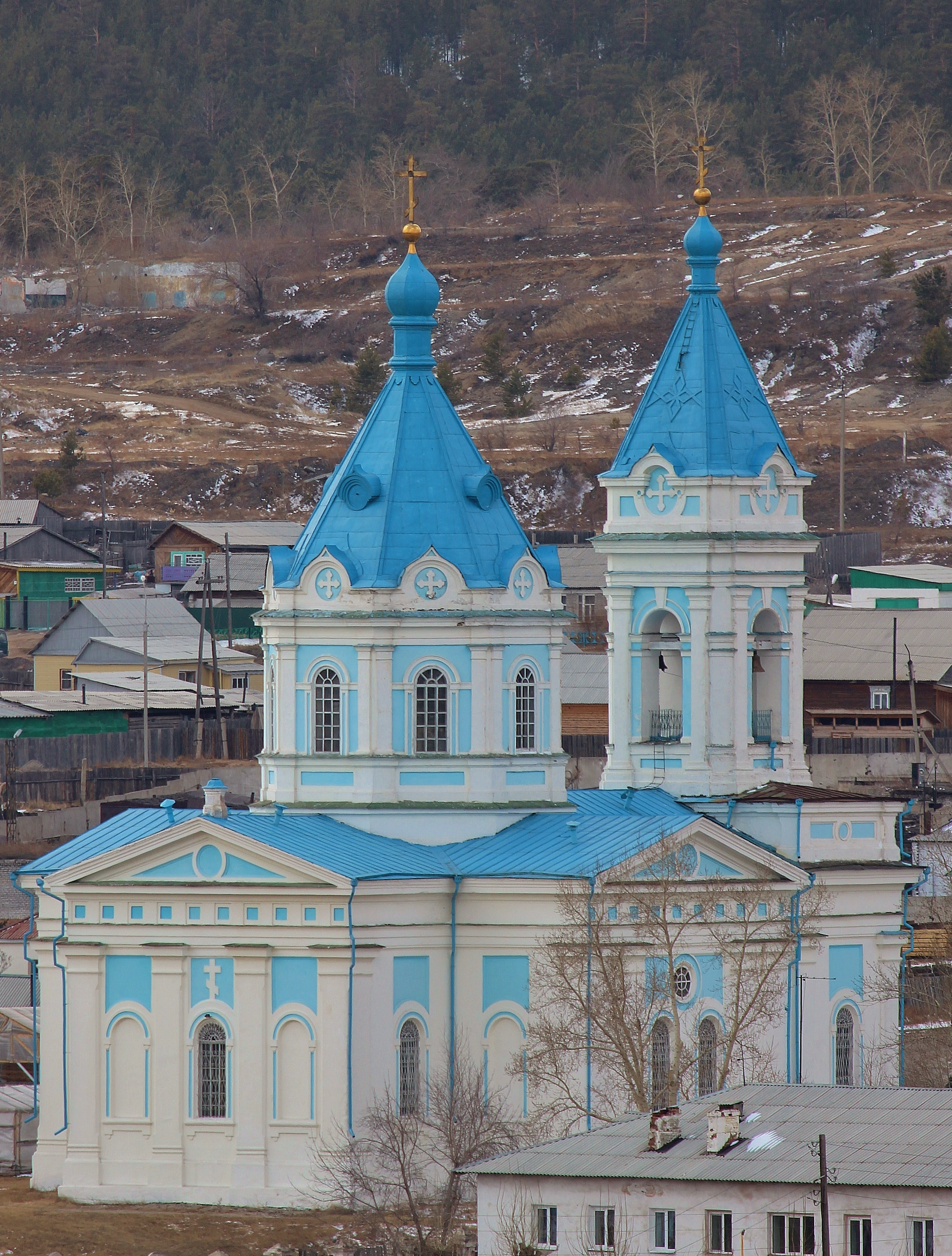
The Assumption Church

- Mongolian: Хиагт (Khiagt)
- Manchu: Kiyaktu
- Chinese: 恰克图 / 恰克圖 (Qiàkètú) or 恰克土 (Qiàkètǔ)
- Russian Buryat: Хяагта (Khyaagta)

In Mongolian, Kyakhta was formerly known as Ар Хиагт (Ar Khiagt, lit. 'north Kyakhta'); Altanbulag (then, Maimaicheng) across the border was Өвөр Хиагт (Övör Khiagt, lit. 'south Kyakhta'). When the town was known as Troitskosavsk, its name in Mongolian was Дээд Шивээ (Deed Šhivee).

== Twin towns – sister cities ==
- Sremski Karlovci, Serbia (2025)
