= History of Sino-Russian relations =

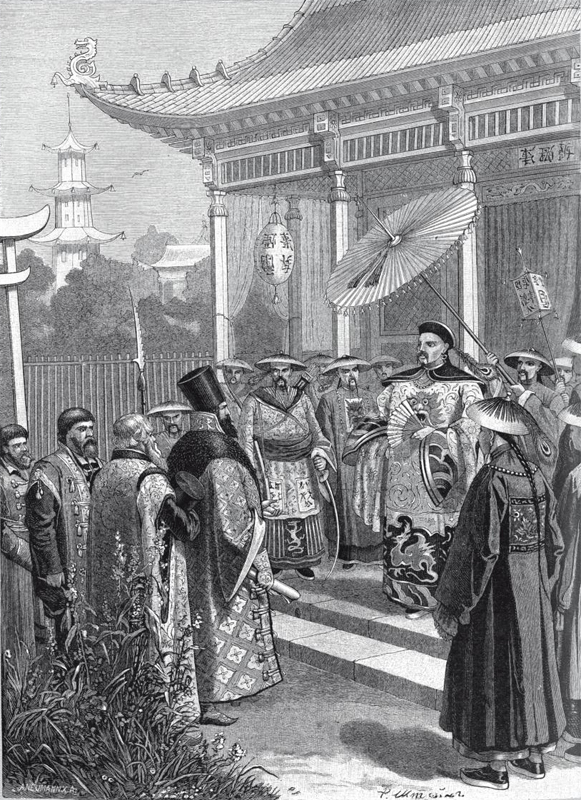
Russian ambassadors in China in the 17th century. Illustration of Niva (Niva, 19th century)

Prior to the 17th century, China and Russia were on opposite ends of Siberia, which was populated by independent nomads. By about 1640 Russian settlers had traversed most of Siberia and founded settlements in the Amur River basin. From 1652 to 1689, the Qing dynasty's armies drove the Russian settlers out, but after 1689, the Qing and the Russian Empire made peace and established trade agreements.

By the mid-19th century, the Qing dynasty's economy and military lagged far behind the colonial powers. It signed unequal treaties with Western countries and Russia, through which Russia annexed the Amur basin and Vladivostok. The Russian Empire and Western powers exacted many other concessions from the Qing, such as indemnities for anti-Western riots, control over China's tariffs, and extraterritorial agreements including legal immunity for foreigners and foreign businesses. Issues that affected only Russia and China were mainly the Russian-Chinese border since Russia, unlike the Western countries, bordered China. Many Chinese people felt humiliated by the Qing's submission to foreign interests, which contributed to widespread hostility toward the Qing emperor.

The 1911 Revolution led to the establishment of the Republic of China. However, the Beiyang government, was forced to sign more unequal treaties with Western countries and Russia. In late 1917, after the beginning of the Russian Civil War, Beiyang government sided with the White Russians and sent troops to fight against the Bolsheviks. The Soviet Union, established in 1922, supported the Kuomintang and ordered the Chinese Communist Party (CCP) to enter into an alliance with them in 1923. The First United Front launched the Northern Expedition, aiming to united China. In 1927, Kuomintang turned against the CCP, leading to the start of the Chinese Civil War. After the beginning of the Second Sino-Japanese War in 1937, the Soviet Union provided military help to the Republic of China, eventually launching an invasion of Manchuria in 1945, which at the time was under Japanese occupation.

After Japan was defeated in 1945, the Chinese Civil War erupted again. In 1949, with Soviet support, the CCP established the People's Republic of China, which entered into an alliance with the Soviets. After Stalin's death in 1953, Nikita Khrushchev came to power, who denounced Stalin in 1956, leading to ideological tension between the two countries to emerge. In 1961, CCP leader Mao Zedong accused the Soviet leadership of revisionism, leading to the Sino-Soviet split. Both countries competed for leadership over the global communist movement. In 1969, a brief border war between the two countries occurred. Khrushchev was replaced by Leonid Brezhnev in 1964, who abandoned many Soviet reforms criticized by Mao. However, China's anti-Soviet rhetoric intensified under the influence of the Gang of Four. Mao died in 1976, and the Gang of Four lost power in 1978. After a period of instability, Deng Xiaoping became the new leader of China. The philosophical difference between both countries lessened since China's new leadership abandoned anti-revisionism. Deng's reform and opening up did not bring an immediate end to conflict with the Soviet Union. In 1979, China invaded Vietnam, which was a Soviet ally. After Mikhail Gorbachev became the Soviet leader in 1985, the Soviet Union reduced the garrisons at the Sino–Soviet border and in Mongolia, resumed trade, and dropped the border issue.

Rapprochement accelerated after the Soviet Union fell and was replaced by the Russian Federation in 1991. Sino–Russian relations since 1991 are currently close and cordial. Both countries maintain a strong geopolitical and regional alliance and significant levels of trade. The land border between the two nations was demarcated in 1991, and they signed the Treaty of Good-Neighborliness and Friendly Cooperation in 2001. Ties have continued to deepen after the 2022 Russian invasion of Ukraine, with Russia increasingly becoming dependent on China since it was hit with large-scale international sanctions.

== Imperial period ==
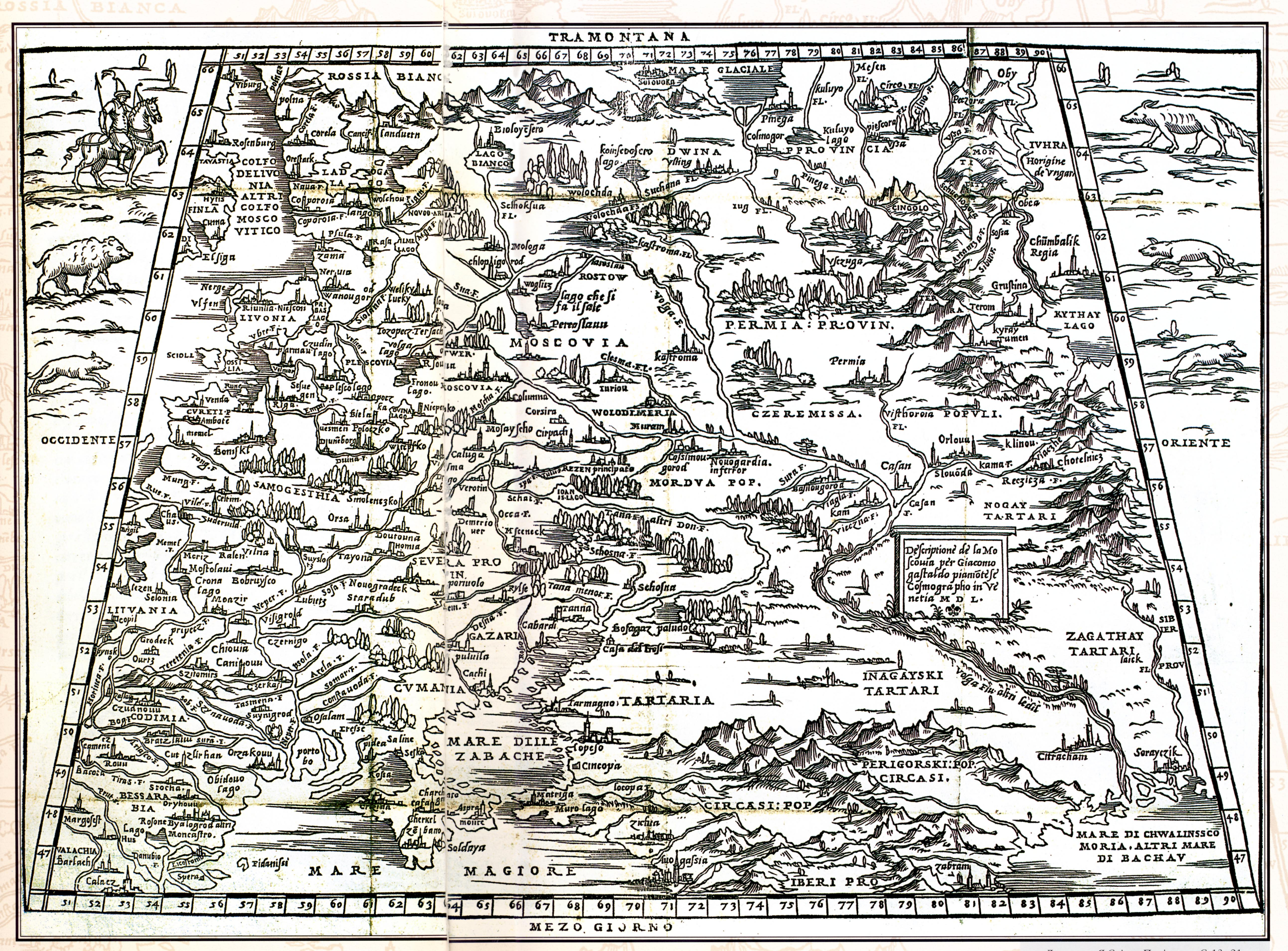
Sixteenth-century maps of Russia often showed "Chumbalik Kingdom" as Russia's southeastern neighbor, which could be reached by traveling from Yugra up the Ob River toward "Lake Kythay". (Map by Giacomo Gastaldi, 1550)

Lying at opposite ends of Eurasia, the two countries had little contact before about 1640. Both had to deal with the steppe nomads, Russia from the south and China from the northwest. Russia became a northern neighbor of China when in 1582–1643 Russian adventurers made themselves masters of the Siberian forests. There were three points of contact: 1) south to the Amur River basin (early), 2) east along the southern edge of Siberia toward Peking (the main axis) and 3) in Turkestan (late).

The Oirats transmitted some garbled and incorrect descriptions of China to the Russians in 1614, the name "Taibykankan" was used to refer to the Wanli Emperor by the Oirats.

=== South to the Amur (1640–1689) ===
About 1640 Siberian cossacks spilled over the Stanovoy Mountains to the Amur River basin. This land was claimed by the Manchus who at this time were just beginning their conquest of China (Qing dynasty). By 1689 the Russians were driven back over the mountains and the Stanovoy Mountains remained the Russo-Chinese frontier from the Treaty of Nerchinsk (1689) to the Treaty of Aigun in 1859. For a full account see Sino–Russian border conflicts.

=== Russian expansion eastward along the southern edge of Siberia ===
Russian expansion in Siberia was confined to the forested area because the Cossacks were skilled in forest travel and were seeking furs while the forest natives were weak and the steppe nomads warlike. In the west, Siberia borders on the Kazakh Steppe. North of what is now Mongolia, there are mountains, Lake Baikal and more mountains until the Argun River separates Trans-Baikalia from Manchuria. West of Siberia, Russia slowly expanded down the Volga, around the southern Urals and out into the Kazakh steppe.

=== Early contacts ===
From the time of Kievan Rus' there was trade (fur, slaves) down the Volga to the Caspian Sea and Persia. Later trade extended southeast to the main Asian trade routes at Bukhara. Under the Mongol Yoke, Russian princes would regularly travel to Sarai for investiture. When Marco Polo returned from China he mentioned Russia as an obscure country in the far north. In 1466/73 Afanasy Nikitin made a journey southeast to India and left an interesting account. After the English reached the White Sea, Anthony Jenkinson travelled through Muscovy to Bukhara. In 1608 the Voivode of Tomsk tried and failed to reach China via the Altan Khan in western Mongolia. In 1616 a second attempt got as far as the Khan (Vasilly Tyumenets and Ivan Petrov). The first Russian to reach Peking was probably Ivan Petlin in 1618/19.

After the Russians reached Trans-Baikalia in the 1640s, some trade developed, but it is poorly documented. At this point there were three routes: 1) Irtysh River and east across Dzungaria and Mongolia, 2) Lake Baikal, Selenga River and southeast (the shortest) and 3) Lake Baikal, east to Nerchinsk, and south (slow but safe).

Early Russo-Chinese relations were difficult for three reasons: mutual ignorance, lack of a common language and the Chinese wish to treat the Russians as tributary barbarians, something that the Russians would not accept and did not fully understand. The language problem was solved when the Russians started sending Latin-speaking westerners who could speak to the Jesuit missionaries in Beijing.

In 1654 Fyodor Baykov was sent as the first ambassador, but his mission failed because he was unwilling to comply with the rules of Chinese diplomacy. Setkul Ablin, a Central Asian in the Russian service travelled to Peking in 1655, 1658 and 1668. It was apparently on his third trip that the Manchus realized that these people from the west were the same as those who were raiding the Amur. In 1670 the Nerchinsk voyvode sent Ignatiy Milovanov to Beijing (he was probably the first Russian to cross Manchuria). The next ambassador, Nicholae Milescu (1675–78) was also unsuccessful. After months of fruitless arguments, he was given a blunt lecture about the proper behavior of tributary barbarians and sent home. After the capture of Albazin in 1685, a few Russians, commonly referred to as Albazinians, settled in Beijing where they founded the Chinese Orthodox Church.

=== Treaty of Nerchinsk (1689) ===
After their first victory at Albazin in 1685, the Manchus sent two letters to the Tsar (in Latin) suggesting peace and demanding that Russian freebooters leave the Amur. The resulting negotiations led the Treaty of Nerchinsk. The Russians gave up the Amur valley but kept the land between Lake Baikal and the Argun River. The treaty said nothing about what is now Mongolia since that area was then controlled by the Oirat Zunghar Khanate.

After Nerchinsk regular caravans started running from Nerchinsk south to Peking. Some of the traders were Central Asians. The round trip took from ten to twelve months. The trade was apparently profitable to the Russians but less so to the Chinese. The Chinese were also disenchanted by the drunken brawls of the traders. In 1690 the Qing defeated the Oirats at the Great Wall and gained complete control over the Khalka Mongols in Inner Mongolia. In 1696 the Oirats were defeated and driven back to the Altai Mountains (Kangxi Emperor in person with 80,000 troops in a battle near Ulaanbaatar). This opened the possibility of trade from Baikal southeastward and raised the problem of the northern border of Outer Mongolia. In March 1692 Eberhard Isbrand Ides, a Dane in the Russian service, was sent from Nerchinsk as ambassador. The Manchus raised the question of the border west of the Argun. Ides returned to Moscow January 1695. From this time it was decided that the China trade would be a state monopoly. Four state caravans travelled from Moscow to Peking between 1697 and 1702. The fourth returned via Selenginsk (near Lake Baikal) in 90 days and bore a letter from the Li-Fan Yuan suggesting that future trade use this route.

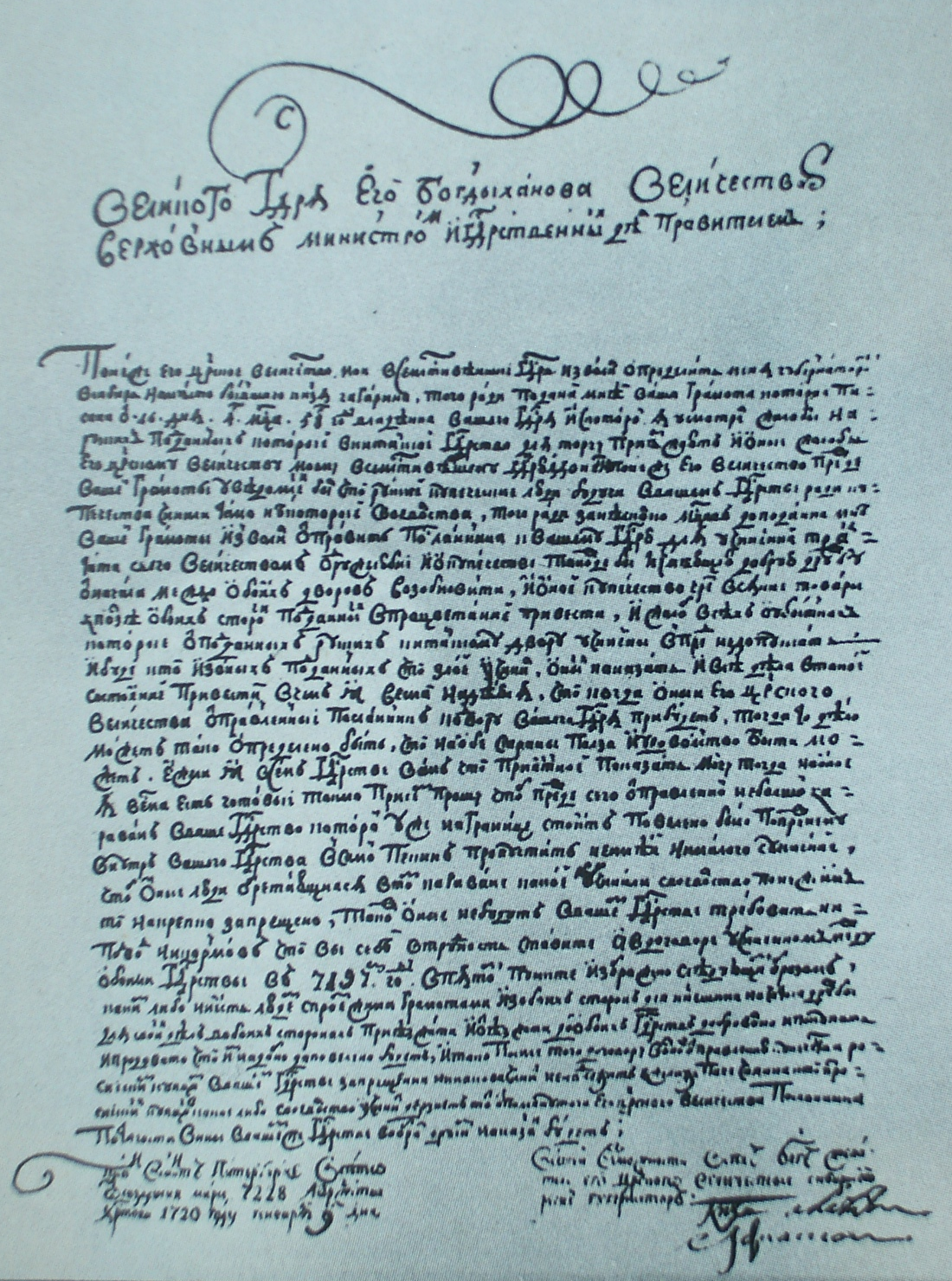
A 1720 letter from Russian officials to Kangxi's court

In 1712 Tulishen became the first Manchu or Chinese official to visit Russia (not counting earlier visits to Nerchinsk). He was mainly interested in the Kalmyks along the Caspian Sea and how they might be used to deal with their cousins, the Oirats. He left Peking in June 1712 and reached Tobolsk in August 1713. Here he learned that he could not see the Tsar because of the Swedish wars. He went to Saratov and down the Volga to visit Ayuka Khan of the Kalmyks. He returned to Peking in April 1715. His report, 'Yiyilu' of 'Record of Strange Regions' was long the main source of Chinese knowledge of Russia.

About this time the Kangxi Emperor began to put pressure on Saint Petersburg to delineate the Mongolian border west of the Argun, and several Russian caravans were held up. In July 1719 Lev Izmailov was sent as ambassador to Peking where he dealt with Tulishen, but the Chinese would not deal with the trade problem until the border was dealt with. Izmailov returned to Moscow in January 1722. Lorents Lange was left as consul in Peking, but was expelled in July 1722. He returned to Selenginsk and sent reports to Petersburg.

=== Treaty of Kyakhta (1729) ===
Just before his death, Peter the Great decided to deal with the border problem. The result was the Treaty of Kyakhta. This defined the northern border of what is now Mongolia (except for Tuva) and opened up the Kyakhta caravan trade southeast to Peking.

The needs for communication between the Russian and Chinese traders at Kyakhta and elsewhere resulted in the development of a pidgin, known to linguists as Kyakhta Russian-Chinese Pidgin.

The treaties of Nerchinsk and Kyakhta were the basis of Russo-Chinese relations until the Treaty of Aigun in 1858. The fixed border helped the Chinese to gain full control of Outer Mongolia and annex Xinjiang by about 1755. Russo-Chinese trade shifted from Nerchinsk to Kyakhta and the Nerchensk trade died out by about 1750. (Local trade in this area shifted east to a border town called Tsurukhaitu on the Argun River).

=== Turkestan ===
After the Russians reached Tobolsk in 1585, it was natural to continue up the Irtysh River to the Kazakh steppes north of Lake Balkhash to Dzungaria and western Mongolia, which was the route used by Fyodor Baykov to reach China. In 1714, Peter the Great sent Ivan Bukholts with 1,500 troops, including Swedish miners who were prisoners of war, up the Irtysh to Lake Zaysan to search for gold. The next year, he ascended the river again with 3,000 workers to build a fort. Tsewang Rabtan (or Tseren-Donduk) of the Zunghar Khanate attacked them and drove them back to Omsk. In 1720, an expedition, under Ivan Likharev, ascended the river and founded a permanent settlement at Ust-Kamenogorsk just west of the lake. Meanwhile, the Zunghars were severely defeated by the Manchus and driven out of Tibet. In 1721 to 1723, Peter sent Ivan Unkovsky to attempt to discuss an alliance. A major reason for the failure was that Lorents Lange at Selenginsk had turned over a number of Mongol refugees to the Manchus as part of the buildup to the Treaty of Kyakhta. In 1755, the Qing destroyed the remnants of the Zunghar Khanate, creating a Russo-Chinese border in Xinjiang. The area did not become active again until the Russian conquest of Turkestan.

=== 1755–1917 ===
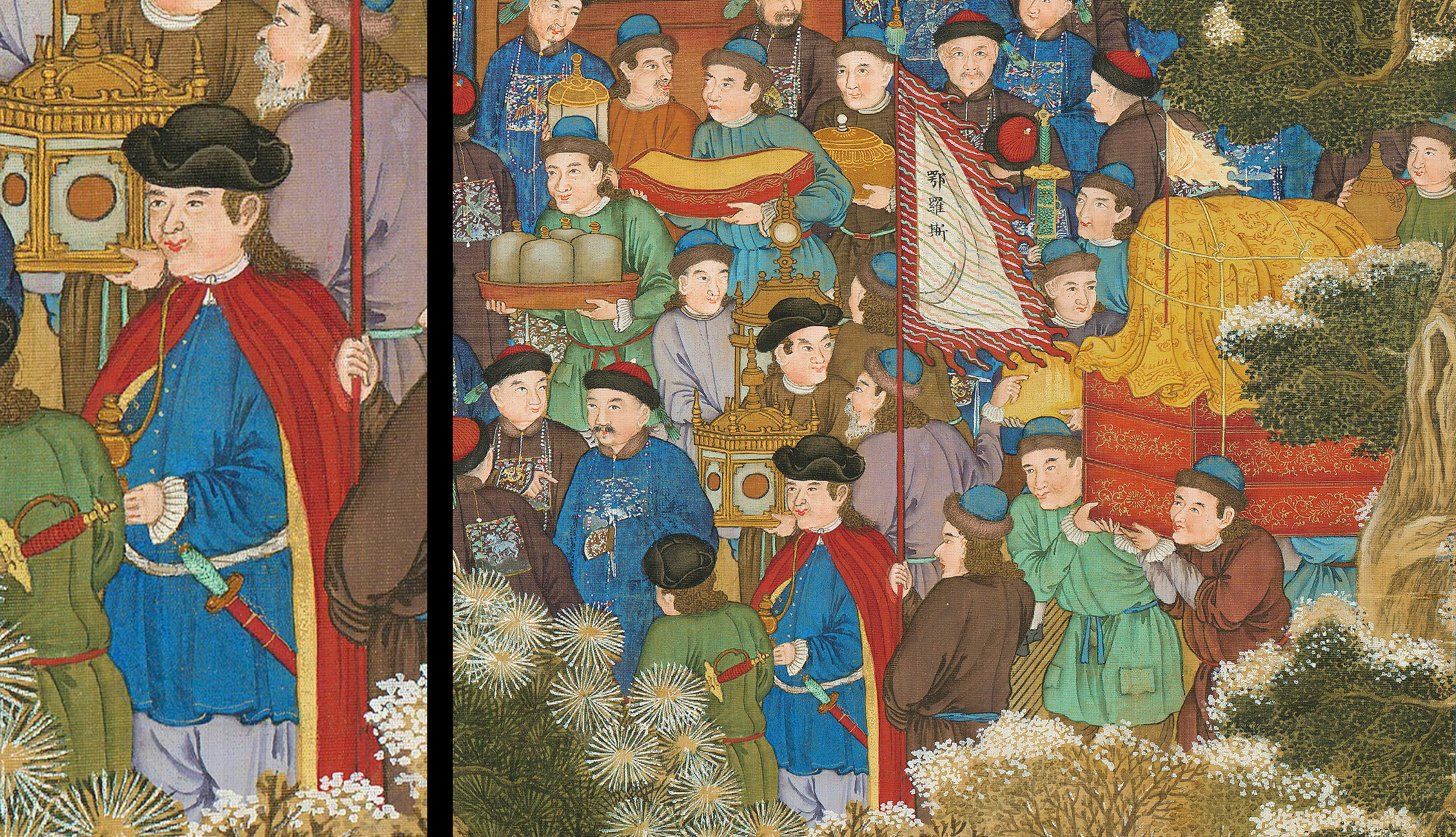
Russia delegates (鄂羅斯国) in Beijing in 1761. Ten Thousand Nations Coming to Pay Tribute

=== Meeting in Central Asia ===
As the Chinese Empire established its control over Xinjiang in the 1750s, and the Russian Empire expanded into Kazakhstan in the early 1800s, the two empires' areas of control met in what is today eastern Kazakhstan and Western Xinjiang. The 1851 Treaty of Kulja legalized trade between both countries in the region.

=== Russian encroachment ===
In 1858, during the Second Opium War, China grew increasingly weaker as the "Sick man of Asia" while Russia strengthened and eventually annexed the north bank of the Amur River and the coast down to the Korean border in the "Unequal Treaties" of Treaty of Aigun (1858) and the Convention of Peking (1860). Russia and Japan gained control of Sakhalin Island.

The Manza War (1868) was the first attempt by Russia to expel the Chinese from the territory that it controlled. Hostilities broke out around Peter the Great Gulf, Vladivostok, when the Russians tried to shut off gold mining operations and to expel Chinese workers there. The Chinese resisted a Russian attempt to take Askold Island and in response, two Russian military stations and three Russian towns were attacked by the Chinese, and the Russians failed to oust the Chinese.

==== Russia's special status ====
Unlike other Western countries, who deal with the Qing court on a monarch to monarch basis, Sino–Russian relations were governed by administrative bodies, the Qing's Board of Foreign Affairs (Lifan Yuan) and the Russian Senate (Senat). Unlike the Netherlands and Portugal in the 18th century, who were considered part of the tribute system, Russia was able to trade directly with Beijing, and their relations were under the jurisdiction of Mongolian and Manchu border officials. Russia established an Orthodox mission in Beijing in the early 18th century, and was able to escape the anti Christian persecutions of the Qing dynasty.

=== The Great Game and the 1870s Xinjiang border Dispute ===
A British observer, Demetrius Charles de Kavanagh Boulger, suggested a British-Chinese alliance to check Russian expansion in Central Asia.

During the Ili crisis, when Qing China threatened to go to war against Russia over the Russian occupation of Ili, a British officer, Charles George Gordon, was sent to China by Britain to advise China on its military options against Russia in a potential war between China and Russia.

The Russians occupied the city of Kuldja, in Xinjiang, during the Dungan revolt (1862–1877). After General Zuo Zongtang and his Xiang Army crushed the rebels, they demanded for Russia to return the occupied regions.

General Zuo Zongtang was outspoken in calling for war against Russia and hoped to settle the matter by attacking Russian forces in Xinjiang with his Xiang army. In 1878, tension increased in Xinjiang, and Zuo massed Chinese troops toward Russian-occupied Kuldja. Chinese forces also fired on Russian expeditionary forces originating from Yart Vernaic, expelled them, and caused a Russian retreat.

The Russians observed that the Chinese building up their arsenal of modern weapons during the Ili crisis since they had bought thousands of rifles from Germany. In 1880, massive amounts of military equipment and rifles were shipped via boats to China from Antwerp as China purchased torpedoes, artillery, and 260,260 modern rifles from Europe.

A Russian military observer, D. V. Putiatia, visited China in 1888 and found that in Northeastern China (Manchuria), along the Chinese-Russian border, the Chinese soldiers could become adept at "European tactics" under certain circumstances and were armed with modern weapons, like Krupp artillery, Winchester carbines, and Mauser rifles.

Compared to the Russian-controlled areas, more benefits were given to the Muslim Kirghiz in the Chinese-controlled areas. Russian settlers fought against the Muslim nomadic Kirghiz, which led the Russians to believe that the Kirghiz would be a liability in any conflict against China. The Muslim Kirghiz were sure that a war would have China defeat Russia.

The Qing dynasty forced Russia to hand over disputed territory in the Treaty of Saint Petersburg (1881) in what was widely seen by the west as a diplomatic victory for the Qing. Russia acknowledged that China could pose a serious military threat. Mass media in the West portrayed China as a rising military power because of its modernization programs and as a major threat to the West. They even invoked fears that China would manage to conquer western colonies like Australia.

Russian sinologists, the Russian media, the threat of internal rebellion, the pariah status inflicted by the Congress of Berlin, and the negative state of the Russian economy all led Russia to concede and negotiate with China in Saint Petersburg and to return most of Ili to China.

Historians have judged the Qing dynasty's vulnerability and weakness to foreign imperialism in the 19th century to be based mainly on its maritime naval weakness although it achieved military success against Westerners on land. Historian Edward L. Dreyer stated, "China's nineteenth-century humiliations were strongly related to her weakness and failure at sea. At the start of the Opium War, China had no unified navy and no sense of how vulnerable she was to attack from the sea; British forces sailed and steamed wherever they wanted to go.... In the Arrow War (1856–60), the Chinese had no way to prevent the Anglo-French expedition of 1860 from sailing into the Gulf of Zhili and landing as near as possible to Beijing. Meanwhile, new but not exactly modern Chinese armies suppressed the midcentury rebellions, bluffed Russia into a peaceful settlement of disputed frontiers in Central Asia, and defeated the French forces on land in the Sino–French War (1884–85). But the defeat of the fleet, and the resulting threat to steamship traffic to Taiwan, forced China to conclude peace on unfavorable terms."

According to Henry Hugh Peter Deasy in 1901 on the people of Xinjiang: "insurrection is about the last course to which the natives would of their own accord resort. Any riots and disturbances which occur are got up by the officials for the purpose of inflicting injury on foreigners. The population have no fighting courage, no arms, no leaders, are totally incapable of combined action, and, so far as the government of their own country is concerned. may be regarded as of no account. They have been squeezed to the utmost, but would prefer to remain under the dominion of China. If they are questioned, they say 'The Chinese plunder us, but they do not drive and hustle us, and we can do as we please.' This opinion agrees with that of the Andijanis, or natives of Russian Turkestan, who assert that Russian rule is much disliked among them, owing to the harassing administration to which they are subjected."

=== 1890s alliance ===
Russian Finance Minister Sergei Witte controlled East Asian policy in the 1890s. His goal was the peaceful expansion of trade and the increase of Russian influence over China. Japan's greatly-expanded and modernized military easily defeated the antiquated Chinese forces in the First Sino–Japanese War (1894–1895). Russia now faced the choice of working with Japan, which had fairly good relations for some years, or acting as protector of China against Japan. Witte chose the latter policy, and in 1894 Russia joined Germany and France in forcing Japan to soften the peace terms that it had imposed on China. Japan was forced to return the Liaodong Peninsula and Port Arthur (both territories in southeastern Manchuria, a Chinese province) to China. The new Russian role angered Tokyo, which decided that Russia was the main enemy in its quest to control Manchuria, Korea, and China. Witte underestimated Japan's growing economic and military power and exaggerated Russia's military prowess.

Russia concluded an alliance with China in 1896 by the Li–Lobanov Treaty, with China a junior partner and practically a protectorate. It led in 1898 to an occupation and administration by Russian personnel and police of the entire Liaodong Peninsula and to a fortification of the ice-free Port Arthur. Since Russia was receiving large-loans from France, Witte used some of the funds to establish the Russo-Chinese Bank, which provided 100 million rubles for China to fund the reparations that it owed to Japan. Along with the International Commercial Bank of St-Petersburg, it became the conduit through which Russian capital was funneled into East Asia. Furthermore, the Russo-Chinese Bank bankrolled the Russian government's policies towards Manchuria and Korea. That enormous leverage allowed Russia to make strategic leases of key military ports and defense stations. The Chinese government ceded its concession rights for building and owning the new Chinese Eastern Railway, which was to cross northern Manchuria from the west to the east, to link Siberia with Vladivostok, and strengthen the military capabilities of the Russian forces in the Far East greatly. It was built in 1898 to 1903 and operated by the Russo-Chinese Bank and allowed Russia to become economically dominant in Manchuria, which was still nominally controlled by Peking.

In 1899, the Boxer Rebellion broke out with Chinese nativist attacks on all foreigners. A large coalition of eleven major Western powers, led by Russia and Japan, sent an army to relieve their diplomatic missions in Peking and to take control of the Chinese capital. The Russian government used it as an opportunity to bring a substantial army into Manchuria, which became a fully-incorporated outpost of Russia in 1900. Japan started to prepare for a war with Russia over Korea and Manchuria.

=== Russo-Japanese War ===
Chinese Honghuzi bandits were nomads who came from China, roamed the area around Manchuria and the Russo-Chinese border, and raided Russian settlers in the Far East from 1870 to 1920.

=== Revolutions ===
Both countries saw their monarchies abolished during the 1910s, the Chinese Qing dynasty in 1912, following the Xinhai Revolution, and the Russian Romanov dynasty in 1917, following the February Revolution.

== Soviet Union, Republic of China, People's Republic of China ==
=== Russian Civil War and Mongolia ===
The Beiyang government, in Northern China, joined the Allied intervention in the Russian Civil War. It sent 2,300 troops in Siberia and North Russia in 1918 after the request by the Chinese community in the area.

Mongolia and Tuva became contested territories. After being occupied by Chinese General Xu Shuzheng in 1919 and then by the Russian White general turned independent warlord, Ungern von Sternberg, in 1920, Soviet troops, with the support of Mongolian guerrillas, led by Damdin Sükhbaatar, defeated the White warlord and established a new pro-Soviet Mongolian client state. By 1924, it had become the Mongolian People's Republic.

=== KMT, CCP, and the Chinese Civil War ===
Soviet Foreign Minister Georgy Chicherin played a major role in establishing formal relations with China in 1924, and in designing the Kremlin's China policy. He focused on the Chinese Eastern Railway, Manchuria, and the Mongolian issue. In 1921, the Soviet Union began supporting the Kuomintang, and in 1923, the Comintern instructed the CCP to sign a military treaty with the KMT. But in 1926, KMT leader, Chiang Kai-shek abruptly dismissed his Soviet advisers, and imposed restrictions on CCP participation in the government. By 1927, when the Northern Expedition was nearly concluded, Chiang purged the CCP from the KMT-CCP alliance, resulting in the Chinese Civil War which was to last until 1950, a few months after the People's Republic of China, led by Mao Zedong, was proclaimed. During the war, some Soviet support was given to the CCP, who in 1934 were dealt a crushing blow when the KMT brought an end to the Chinese Soviet Republic, beginning the CCP's Long March to Shaanxi.

=== Second Sino–Japanese War and World War II ===
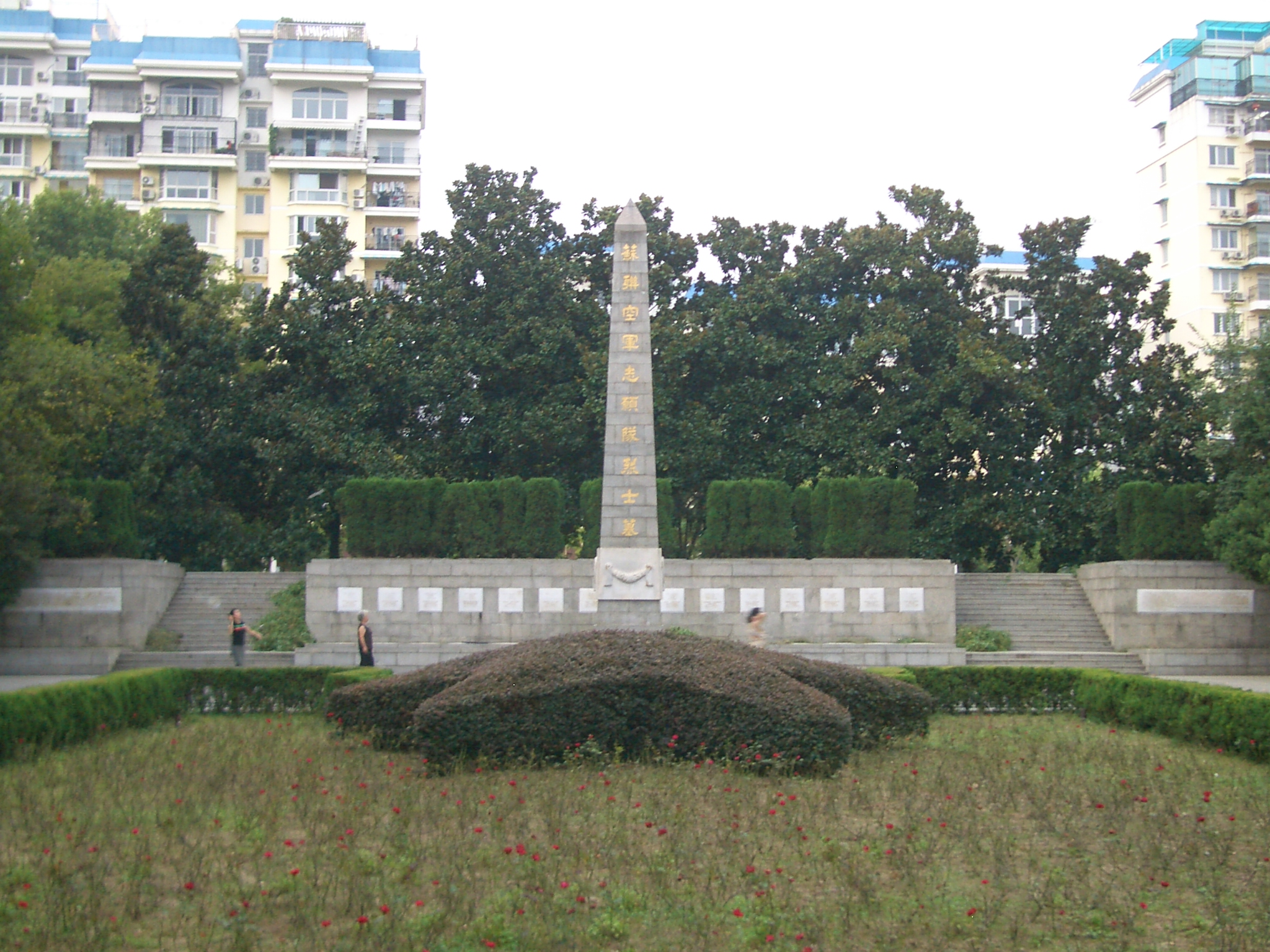
Monument to Soviet aviators in Wuhan

In 1931, the Empire of Japan invaded Manchuria and created the puppet state of Manchukuo (1932), which signalled the beginning of the Second Sino-Japanese War. In 1937, a month after the Marco Polo Bridge Incident, the Soviet Union established a non-aggression pact with the Republic of China. During the World War II-period, the two countries suffered more losses than any other country, with China (in the Second Sino-Japanese War) losing over 35 million and the Soviet Union 27 million people.

=== Joint-victory over Imperial Japan ===
On August 8, 1945, three months after Nazi Germany surrendered, and on the week of the American atomic bombings of Hiroshima and Nagasaki (August 6 and 9), the Soviet Union launched the Soviet invasion of Manchuria, a massive military operation mobilizing 1.5 million soldiers against one million Kwantung Army troops, the last remaining Japanese military presence. Soviet forces won a decisive victory while the Kwantung suffered massive casualties, with 700,000 having surrendered. The Soviet Union distributed some of the weapons of the captured Kwantung Army to the CCP, who would go on to battle the KMT in the Chinese Civil War.

=== Independence of Mongolia ===
The China, Soviet Union: Treaty of Friendship and Alliance was signed by the Soviet Union and the Republic of China. It stated that possible Mongolian independence was in exchange for the Soviets' failure to support the communists in China.

=== People's Republic of China ===
On October 1, 1949, the People's Republic of China was proclaimed by Mao Zedong, and by May 1950, the civil war was brought to an end by the Battle of Kuningtou, which saw the KMT expelled from Mainland China but remaining in control of Taiwan. With the creation of the People's Republic of China, the supreme political authority in the two countries became centered in two communist parties, which both espoused revolutionary Marxist-Leninist ideology: the CCP and the Communist Party of the Soviet Union.

In 1951, Chinese Muslim General Bai Chongxi made a speech in Taiwan to the entire Muslim world that called for a war against the Soviets and the avoiding of Indian Prime Minister Jawaharlal Nehru, who was accused of being blind to Soviet imperialism.

=== From camaraderie to the Sino–Soviet Split ===
After the PRC was proclaimed, the Soviet Union became its closest ally for several years. Soviet design, equipment, and skilled labour were sent out to help the Industrialization and the modernization of the PRC. In the 1960s, relations became deeply strained by the Sino–Soviet Split. In military terms, there was the low-level Sino–Soviet border conflict.

The split was ideological and forced communist parties around the world to take sides. Many of them split, and the pro-Soviet communists were battling the pro-Chinese communists for local control of global communism. The split quickly made a dead letter of the 1950 alliance between Moscow and Beijing, destroyed the socialist camp's unity, and affected the world balance of power. Internally, it encouraged Mao to plunge China into the Cultural Revolution to expunge traces of Soviet ways of thinking. The quarrel began in 1958, after several years of close relations. Mao was always loyal to Stalin, and Nikita Khrushchev felt insulted. However, when the Warsaw Pact crushed the dissident movements in Eastern Europe in 1956, Beijing was pleased that Moscow had apparently realized the dangers of de-Stalinization and would no longer tolerate independence or encourage revisionism. Beijing was also pleased that the success of the Soviet Union in the space race (the original Sputniks) demonstrated that the international communist movement had caught up in high technology with the West. Mao argued that as far as all-out nuclear war was concerned, the human race would not be destroyed, but a brave new communist world would arise from the ashes of imperialism. That attitude troubled Moscow, which had a more realistic view of the utter disasters that would accompany a nuclear war. Three major issues suddenly became critical in dividing the two nations: Taiwan, India, and China's Great Leap Forward. Although Moscow supported Beijing's position of Taiwan entirely belonging to China, it demanded to be forewarned of any invasion or serious threat that would bring an American intervention. Beijing refused, and the Chinese bombardment of the island of Quemoy in August 1958 escalated the tensions. Moscow was cultivating India, both as a major purchaser of munitions and as a strategically critical ally. However China escalated its threats to the northern fringes of India, especially from Tibet, and was building a militarily significant road system that would reach disputed areas along the border. Moscow clearly favored India, and Beijing felt betrayed as a result.

By far, the major ideological issue was the Great Leap Forward, which represented the Chinese rejection of the Soviet form of economic development. The Soviets were deeply resentful, especially since they had spent heavily to supply China with cutting-edge technology, even including some nuclear tech. The Soviets withdrew their vital technicians and economic and military aid. Khrushchev was increasingly crude and intemperate in ridiculing China and Mao to both communist and noncommunist audiences. China responded through its official propaganda network of rejecting Moscow's claim to Lenin's heritage. Beijing insisted that it was the true inheritor of the great Leninist tradition.

At one major meeting of communist parties, Khrushchev personally attacked Mao as an ultraleftist and a left revisionist and compared him to Stalin for dangerous egotism. The conflict was now out of control and was increasingly fought out in 81 communist parties around the world. The final split came in July 1963, after 50,000 refugees escaped from Sinkiang, in Western China, to Soviet territory to escape persecution. China ridiculed the Soviet incompetence in the Cuban Missile Crisis of 1962 as adventurism and capitulationism that ended up in defeat. Moscow was increasingly prioritizing friendly relationships and test ban treaties with the United States and the United Kingdom.

Increasingly, China began to consider the Soviet Union, which it viewed as social imperialist, as the greatest threat it faced, more so than even the leading capitalist power, the United States. In turn, overtures were made between the PRC and the US, such as in the Ping Pong Diplomacy and the 1972 Nixon visit to China.

From 1965 to 1988, the Sino–Soviet border, including the Tumen River area, became highly militarized and fortified. That included a large concentration of tactical nuclear-armed missile sites on both sides of the zone. Until 1991, foreigners, consulates and nonresidents had not been permitted in Vladivostok since 1948 or in Yanbian or the border areas of Heilongjiang Province since 1965. Political, social, and economic conditions deteriorated further, as the Cultural Revolution disrupted Chinese life and institutions from 1966 to 1972. Periods of extreme tension in 1968 to 1970 along the eastern Sino–Soviet border (with Primorsky) resulted in border skirmishes on the Ussuri River in 1969 and again from 1979 to 1980, when Vietnam invaded Cambodia, and China retaliated by launching a border war with Vietnam. The skirmishes led to the intensification of border fortifications and the mobilization of the civilian populations on both sides.

=== Post-Mao era and stabilizing relations ===
In September 1976, Mao died. A month later, the Gang of Four were overthrown by his successor, Chairman Hua Guofeng, with the support of Deng Xiaoping, who was to soon implement the reform and opening up. With the PRC no longer espousing the anti-revisionist notion of the antagonistic contradiction between classes, relations between the two countries became gradually normalized. In 1979, however, the PRC launched the Sino–Vietnamese War. The invasion of Vietnam, a Soviet ally, was in response to Vietnam's invasion and subsequent occupation of Cambodia, which overthrew the Chinese-backed Khmer Rouge from power. Even though Soviet leader Mikhail Gorbachev went on to criticize the post-Maoist CCP for allowing PRC millionaires to have lost the socialist path, with the dissolution of the Soviet Union in the late 1980s and the early 1990s, Russia itself turned to privatization.

=== Dissolution of the Soviet Union ===
Unlike in the PRC, a much more extreme, highly -unregulated form of privatization occurred during the presidency of Boris Yeltsin, which resulted in asset grabs by Russians in a highly unregulated fashion and in deep socio-economic inequalities in Russia and the collapse of the economy as well as various Russian institutions. Thus, after the Cold War, the PRC emerged in a far more favourable and stable financial position. The PRC is currently seeing the fastest rate of economic growth of any large economy, several percentage points higher than Russia, which has been growing at an annualized rate of some 5–6%. The economy of Russia in the early 2000s was largely driven by demand for export of natural resources to Europe and Asia, with a gradual move up the value-added chain as Russian aluminum and steel mills upgrade to international standards. China is the growth market, and with the ESPO pipeline, Russia will continue to diversify energy exports away from Europe and towards Asia.

=== China and the Russian Federation ===
China and Russia share a land border which was demarcated in 1991, and they signed the Treaty of Good-Neighborliness and Friendly Cooperation in 2001, which was renewed in June 2021 for five more years. On the eve of a 2013 state visit to Moscow by General Secretary of the Chinese Communist Party Xi Jinping and President of the Russian Federation Vladimir Putin remarked that the two nations were forging a special relationship. The two countries have enjoyed close relations militarily, economically, and politically, while supporting each other on various global issues. Shared hostilities towards the United States has brought Sino-Russian relations closer, leading both states towards active policy-making through organisations such as BRICS, to create a multipolar international system, based on Eurasianist thinking.

During the 2008 Russo-Georgian war, China opposed Russia's infringement on Georgia's sovereignty. Citing principles of sovereignty, territorial integrity, and global order, China used its influence in the SCO to prevent the organization from supporting Russia.

When China attempted to build closer relations with Russia in 2013, the Russian government initially had reservations. However, the United States sanctions against Russia for its 2014 annexation of Crimea helped push Russia to a warmer relationship with China.

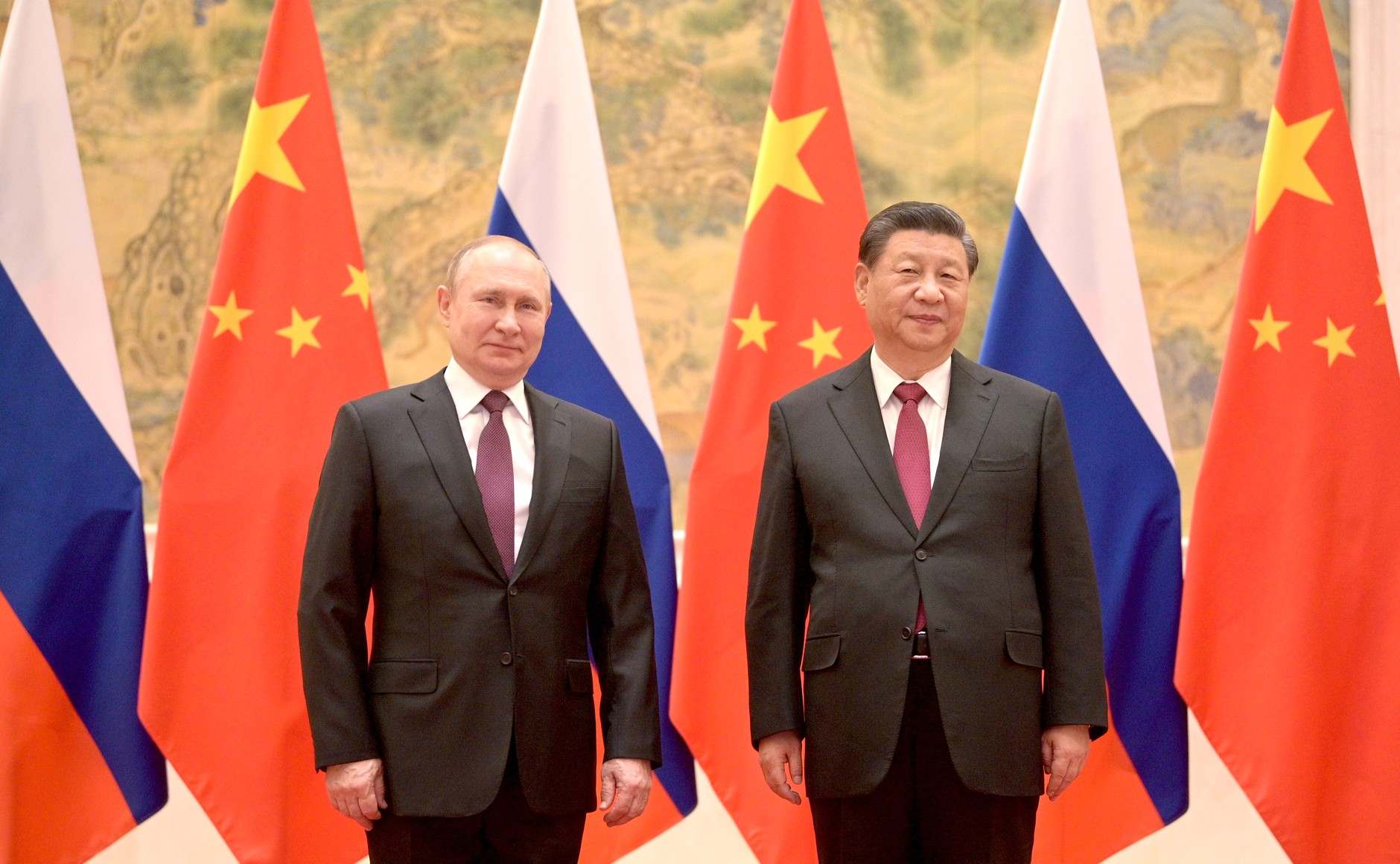
Putin visited China and met with Xi Jinping before invasion of Ukraine

Putin and Xi Jinping met on February 4, 2022, during the run up to the 2022 Beijing Olympics. During the massive Russian build-up of force on the Ukrainian border, with the two expressing, the two countries are nearly united in their anti-US alignment and that both nations shared "no limits" to their commitments. Western Intelligence reports said that China had asked Russia to wait to invade Ukraine until after the Beijing Olympics ended on February 20.

In March 2022, Russia added Taiwan to a list of foreign states and territories that commit "unfriendly actions" against its military invasion of Ukraine.

On March 18, 2024, when Russian President Vladimir Putin accepted questions from Xinhua News Agency reporters at the campaign headquarters in the early morning of the 18th, he said that Russia-China relations will continue to deepen and develop, achieve new achievements, and benefit the people of both countries.

According to the Russian Central Bank, the Chinese yuan was in June 2024 "used to settle more than a third of all Russian exports, up from 0.4% before the full-scale invasion." However, in June 2024 the Bank of China had halted payments to sanctioned Russian banks because it felt compelled by current events and did not want to risk secondary sanctions. As a result of international sanctions during the Russian invasion of Ukraine, China "had become Russia's most important economic partner."

== See also ==
- China–Russia border
- Chinese Eastern Railway
- Li–Lobanov Treaty of 1896 between Russia and China
- Kyakhta trade
- International relations (1814–1919)
- Ethnic Chinese in Russia
- Russians in China
- BRICS, for 21st century relations of Brazil, Russia, India, China and South Africa
- China and Russia: Four Centuries of Conflict and Concord (book)
