= Ablin =

Ablin is a surname. Notable people with the surname include:

- Richard J. Ablin (born 1940), American scientist
- Setkul Ablin (fl. c. 1653–1672) Russian trader and agent
