= Wang Yi =

Chinese diplomat (born 1953)

- 王毅
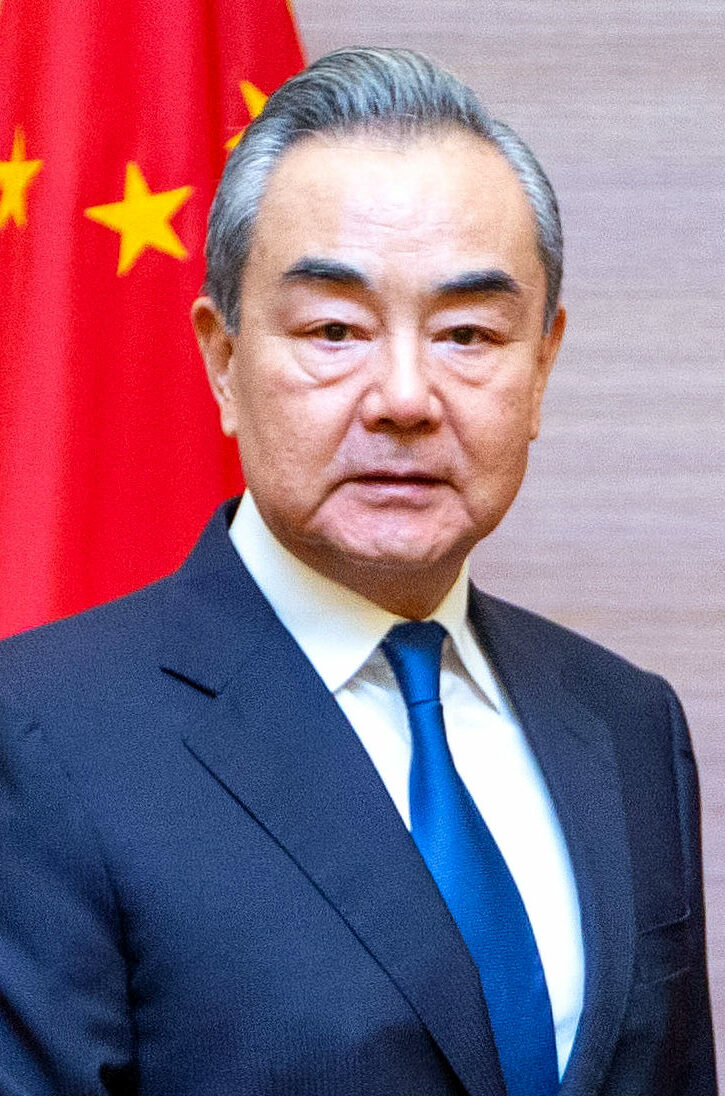
- Wang in 2024

Director of the Office of the Central Foreign Affairs Commission
- Incumbent
- Assumed office 1 January 2023
- General Secretary: Xi Jinping
- Foreign Minister: Qin Gang; Himself
- Preceded by: Yang Jiechi

Minister of Foreign Affairs
- Incumbent
- Assumed office 25 July 2023
- Premier: Li Qiang
- Party Secretary: Qi Yu
- Preceded by: Qin Gang
- In office 16 March 2013 – 30 December 2022
- Premier: Li Keqiang
- Party Secretary: Zhang Yesui; Qi Yu
- Preceded by: Yang Jiechi
- Succeeded by: Qin Gang

State Councilor of China
- In office 19 March 2018 – 12 March 2023
- Premier: Li Keqiang

8th Director of the Taiwan Affairs Office
- In office 1 June 2008 – 16 March 2013
- Premier: Wen Jiabao
- Preceded by: Chen Yunlin
- Succeeded by: Zhang Zhijun

Chinese Ambassador to Japan
- In office 26 September 2004 – 24 September 2007
- Preceded by: Wu Dawei
- Succeeded by: Cui Tiankai

Personal details
- Born: 19 October 1953 (age 73) Beijing, China
- Party: Chinese Communist Party (1981–present)
- Education: Beijing International Studies University (BLit); Nankai University (MEc); China Foreign Affairs University (PhD)
- Occupation: Politician
- Profession: Diplomat
- Website: www.gov.cn/wangyi

Wang Yi (Chinese: 王毅; pinyin: Wáng Yì; born 19 October 1953) is a Chinese diplomat and politician who is the director of the Central Committee Foreign Affairs Commission Office of the Chinese Communist Party (CCP) and Minister of Foreign Affairs.

Born in Beijing, Wang studied Japanese at Beijing International Studies University. He joined the Asian section of the Ministry of Foreign Affairs after his graduation. In 1989, he was sent to the Chinese embassy in Japan and served there for five years. From 1997 to 1998, Wang was a visiting scholar at the Georgetown University in the United States. After his return, he became assistant minister and the director of the office of policy research. In 2001, Wang was elevated to Vice Minister of Foreign Affairs in charge of Asian affairs. From 2004 to 2007, he served as the Chinese ambassador to Japan.

Wang served as the Director of the State Council Taiwan Affairs Office from 2008 to 2013. In 2013, Wang was appointed as the Minister of Foreign Affairs. From 2018 to 2023, he also served as a State Councilor of China. In 2022, he became a member of the CCP Politburo, and was succeeded by Qin Gang as foreign minister. In 2023, after Qin Gang's removal, Wang Yi was reappointed as foreign minister.

== Early and personal life ==
Wang was born in Beijing. After graduating from high school in September 1969, he was sent down to Northeast China. He subsequently served in the Northeast Construction Army Corps in Heilongjiang Province for eight years.

In December 1977, Wang returned to Beijing and enrolled at Beijing International Studies University, where he studied Japanese. He graduated in February 1982 with a Bachelor of Literature in foreign languages. He is known to speak fluent English and Japanese.

Wang is married and has one daughter. His wife, Qian Wei, is the daughter of Qian Jiadong, a former diplomatic secretary to Premier Zhou Enlai.

== Early career ==
Upon graduation from university, Wang was sent to the Asian section of the Ministry of Foreign Affairs by his father-in-law Qian Jiadong, where he began his career as a diplomat. In September 1989, he was sent to the Chinese embassy in Japan and served there for five years. When he returned to China in March 1994, Wang was appointed as vice section chief of the Asian section of the foreign ministry and was promoted to section chief the next year. For his work in the section he received distinction as an outstanding communist party member. From August 1997 to February 1998, Wang was a visiting scholar at the Institute of Foreign Relations of Georgetown University in the United States. Soon after his return, he was promoted to assistant minister and the director of office of policy research. From September 1999, Wang studied international relations at China Foreign Affairs University and obtained a doctoral degree. In February 2001, Wang was elevated to Vice Minister of Foreign Affairs, in charge of Asian affairs. This series of promotions made him consistently among the youngest officials at his level.

In September 2004, Wang was appointed as China's Ambassador to Japan. He served in this post until September 2007. In June 2008, Wang succeeded Chen Yunlin as the director of Taiwan Affairs Office of the State Council of China. One attendee stated that his speech upon receiving this post celebrated the party as the center of the ministry of foreign affairs and referred to Zhou Enlai's founding of the institution.

== Foreign minister and CCP foreign chief ==
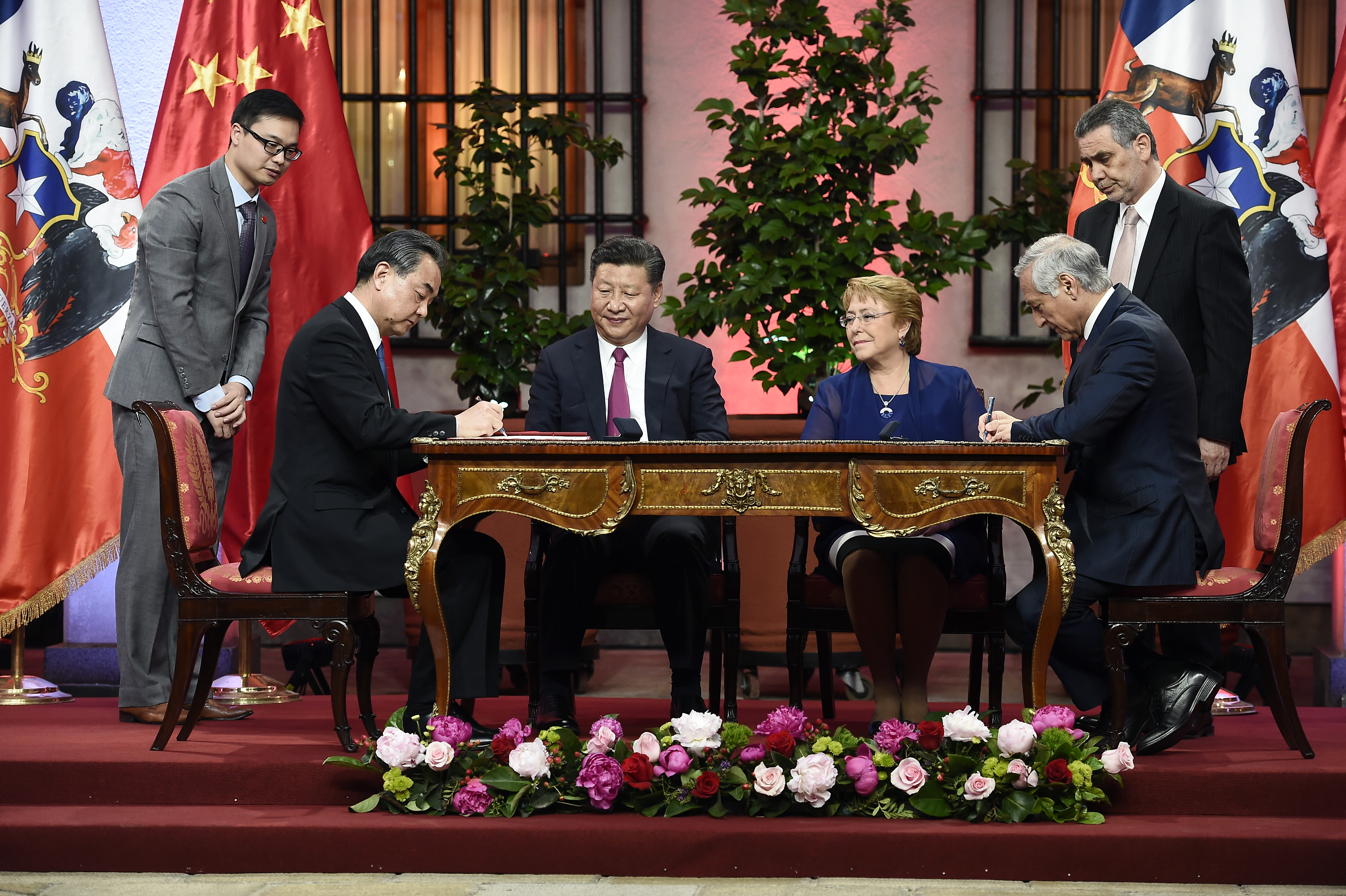
Wang signs a document in 2016 under the guidance of Xi Jinping and the President Michelle Bachelet of Chile; at the other end of the table the Chilean foreign minister is signing the mirror copy

On 16 March 2013, during the first session of the 12th National People's Congress (NPC), Wang was appointed Minister of Foreign Affairs, succeeding Yang Jiechi.

On 1 January 2023, Wang was appointed as the director of the Office of the CCP Central Foreign Affairs Commission, making him China's top diplomat under CCP general secretary Xi Jinping. On 25 July 2023, Wang was reinstated as foreign minister after Qin Gang's dismissal from the post after a month–long absence from public engagements. Wang's reappointment as foreign minister made him the first person to hold the post twice.

China's foreign policy under Xi Jinping has been described as increasingly assertive, even to the point of being dubbed Wolf warrior diplomacy. In his inaugural press conference as Foreign Affairs Minister in March 2014, Wang characterized this new direction as "proactively striving for achievements to let the world hear of the Chinese solutions and Chinese voices." In 2017, Wang's leader described the "Two Guidances", the principles that: (1) China should guide the global community in building a more just and reasonable world order, and (2) that China should guide the global community in safeguarding international security. Following the "Two Guidances", Wang compared China as the "leading goat" in "guiding the reform of global governance." Academics have characterized Wang's tenure as leading a shift away from the former policy of hide your strength, bide your time to a more active role in foreign relations. The One Belt One Road initiative has played a central role in China's foreign policy during this shift.

Wang often meets with foreign counterparts in advance of potential meetings between Xi and other foreign leaders.

=== Multilateral organizations ===
Wang has promoted the Shanghai Cooperation Organisation (SCO) as an important venue for China's multilateral diplomacy. Wang sees the SCO as a way of fostering a multi-polar world order which will benefit China and the global south.

In September 2024, Wang gave a speech to the United Nations General Assembly in which he denounced "unilateral bullying" and trade restrictions. In the speech he criticized Israel's escalations in the Israel–Hezbollah conflict. Wang had recently criticized US arms sales to Taiwan and trade restrictions on China. During his visit to the UN Wang met with Brazilian leaders to discuss the Russo-Ukraine war. China and Brazil then jointly led a twenty-nation global south bloc to discuss a peace resolution. In the security council meeting Wang said the war should not become an excuse to sanction countries. In February 2025, Wang again addressed the United Nations to highlight China's support of multilateral institutions.

In April 2025, Wang Yi attended the BRICS summit to show support for a multipolar world. However, India did not send a representative to the meeting due to ongoing hostility with Pakistan. Wang particularly called for BRICS to cooperate on rules based trade and supporting the World Trade Organization.

In June 2025, at the Forum on China–Africa Cooperation, Wang Yi met with African leaders to implement Xi's announcement that China was dropping tariffs on all African nations (with the exception of Eswatini, due to its support for Taiwan). China is Africa's largest trading partner. At the Two Sessions in 2025, Wang pledged to support the development of African countries.

=== Belt and Road Initiative ===
At the 2017 ministerial conference of the China–Arab States Cooperation Forum, Wang emphasized that the development of ports and railways were an important part of exchanges between China and the Arab countries.

In 2025, Wang took trips to Pakistan and Afghanistan to discuss expanding One Belt One Road programs in each country. Wang emphasized China's support for Pakistan in "agriculture, industry, and mining". Economic programs in each country come alongside anti-terrorism efforts to prevent the Balochistan Liberation Army, Turkistan Islamic Party, and other organizations from disrupting Chinese business.

=== Africa ===
After several years of partnership with CNPC, Niger expelled top executives, citing pay disparities between local and Chinese workers. Yaou Sangaré Bakary then met with Wang in 2025 and stated that China was a strategic partner for Niger. The previous year, China extended a new US$400 million loan-for-oil to Niger after militants strained CNPC's operations in Niger and Benin. Niger is seeking tighter state control of its domestic oil and uranium industries that China is heavily invested in.

As Minister, Wang oversaw several of the ministries' mass work initiatives such as the public celebration of Chinese-Nigerian relations. In 2025, Wang Yi visited Chad and Nigeria to highlight his support for the development of African nations. In Chad, he narrowly missed an attack on the capital and subsequently gave a speech in Nigeria on the need for physical, economic, and political security.

=== Japan ===
On 15 April 2018, Wang was received by his Japanese counterpart Taro Kono, on the first such official visit of a foreign minister of China to Japan since November 2009.

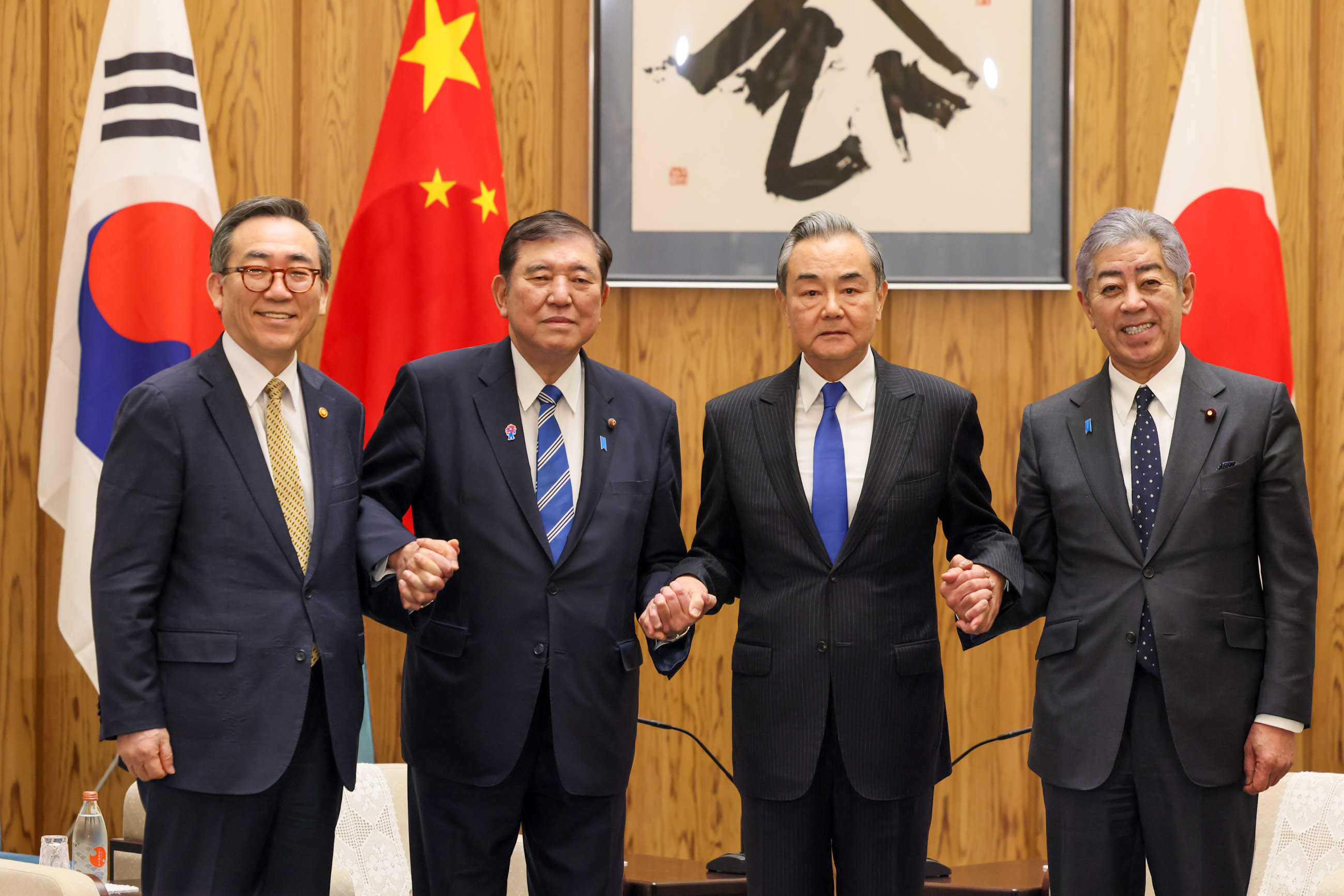
Wang with Japanese Prime Minister Shigeru Ishiba, Japanese Foreign Minister Takeshi Iwaya and South Korean Foreign Minister Cho Tae-yul in Tokyo, Japan, 21 March 2025

In January 2025, Wang Yi publicly called for Japan to improve its ties with China and stated that its existing foreign policy towards China was outdated. Wang sought to change Japan's stance on Taiwan while forming better relations with the Shigeru Ishiba government.

On 23 November 2025, amidst the China–Japan diplomatic crisis, Wang said Japanese Prime Minister Sanae Takaichi's comments regarding a possible contingency in Taiwan were "shocking" and "crossed a red line", saying China would "resolutely respond" and that all countries have a responsibility to "prevent the resurgence of Japanese militarism".

=== Korea ===
In a September 2025 meeting with Cho Hyun, Wang remarked on the US's tariff programs against South Korea and China. He said South Korea and China should work together to protect free trade. In the past, China has acted as an intermediary between North and South Korea. Again, Wang was requested to establish a new round of talks between the peninsular nations. South China Morning Post indicated this meeting may facilitate preparations for Xi to visit South Korea after more than a decade away from Seoul.

In April 2026, Wang visited North Korea, holding talks with North Korean foreign minister Choe Son-hui and North Korean leader Kim Jong Un. Kim told Wang that North Korea "would fully support all the internal and external policies of the Chinese party and government for realizing the territorial integrity of the country on the basis of the 'one-China' principle and building a fair and just multi-polar world".

=== Comments in 2023 Qingdao conference ===
On 3 July 2023, at the 2023 International Forum for Trilateral Cooperation in Qingdao, Wang made remarks during a speech towards the participating Japanese and South Korean audience where he called for Japan and South Korea to work together with China to "prosper together, revitalize East Asia, revitalize Asia and benefit the world" and said that "most Americans and Europeans can't tell China, Japan and South Korea apart" and that "no matter how blonde you dye your hair, how sharp you shape your nose, you can never become a European or American, you can never become a Westerner." before further adding they must know where their "roots lie."

=== Taiwan ===
Wang has focused on several territorial disputes in the South China Sea and the PRC's relationship with Taiwan. As foreign minister, and prior to 2016, he called for an end to the existing political situation, which he further referred to as a "political farce". One former foreign department official praised him for speaking directly and to the point. In 2025, he maintained China's policy towards Taiwan and encouraged the United States to support peaceful reunification. He also led a push by the foreign ministry to frame UN Resolution 2758 as having settled the government of Taiwan as subordinate to the PRC. Taiwan, the United States, and several European nations dispute this interpretation. Some EU members have unofficial ties to Taiwan, which Wang stated were problematic. The South China Morning Post stated that these ties had deepened in the years preceding Wang's remark. Wang maintained that Taiwan can only be referred to as "Taiwan, Province of China" and those who support Taiwanese independence attempt to "interfere in China’s internal affairs, divide the country and disrupt cross-strait stability."

=== Hong Kong ===
In March 2021, Wang supported the decision to have only "patriots" rule Hong Kong, stating that "loving Hong Kong and loving the motherland are consistent requirements...in the past 24 years since Hong Kong's [handover], no one has cared more about the [SAR's] democracy, prosperity and stability than the central government."

In October 2025, Wang Yi gave the inaugural presentation of the International Organization for Mediation.

=== Xinjiang ===
In 2018, Wang said the world should ignore "gossip" about Xinjiang re-education camps. In March 2021, Wang said that "We welcome more people to visit Xinjiang - seeing is believing. This is the best way to debunk rumours."-

=== India ===
The 2020–2021 China–India skirmishes led to both sides increasing their military presence along their border. In 2022, Wang visited for a meeting in which China attempted to frame the border issue in a broader context of bilateral development opportunities. However, prior to the meet, Wang spoke against India's handling of its border dispute with Pakistan. India censured Wang and did not publicly acknowledge his visit. China then refrained from diplomatic visits until Wang attempted to warm relations in 2025. He choose a similar message,

Regardless of the circumstances, both nations should view each other as partners rather than adversaries, handle differences with prudence and ensure that border disputes do not overshadow the larger bilateral relationship.

=== Israel ===
Wang initiated a significant state visit to the Middle East in December 2013 to visit Israel and Palestine. He discussed with leaders of both countries the importance of the nuclear agreement with Iran and the importance of the continued peace talks, saying "War does not solve the problems. Violence increases the hatred. The peace talks are the appropriate and the only path".

In October 2023, during the Gaza war, Israel's Ministry of Foreign Affairs expressed "deep disappointment" over China's failure to condemn the Palestinian militant group Hamas. In response, Wang Yi stated that in Gaza, "Israel’s actions have gone beyond self-defense." Wang responded with a call for ceasefire in Gaza.

Wang Yi encouraged Israel to de-escalate after its attacks in the Twelve-Day War. In a call to his Israeli counterparts, Wang advocated for diplomatic solutions and offered to broker talks. In his call to Iran, Wang supported Iran's right to secure sovereignty and stated Israel had violated the principles of UN Charter. After Wang's calls Xi reiterated his message.

In a phone call with Israeli Foreign Minister Gideon Sa'ar on 3 March 2026, Wang Yi expressed China's opposition to military strikes launched by Israel and the United States against Iran. Wang called for an immediate cessation of hostilities, stating that "force cannot truly solve problems; instead, it often creates new ones and leaves serious long-term consequences." He further emphasized that the "real value of military power lies not on the battlefield but in preventing war."

=== Iran ===
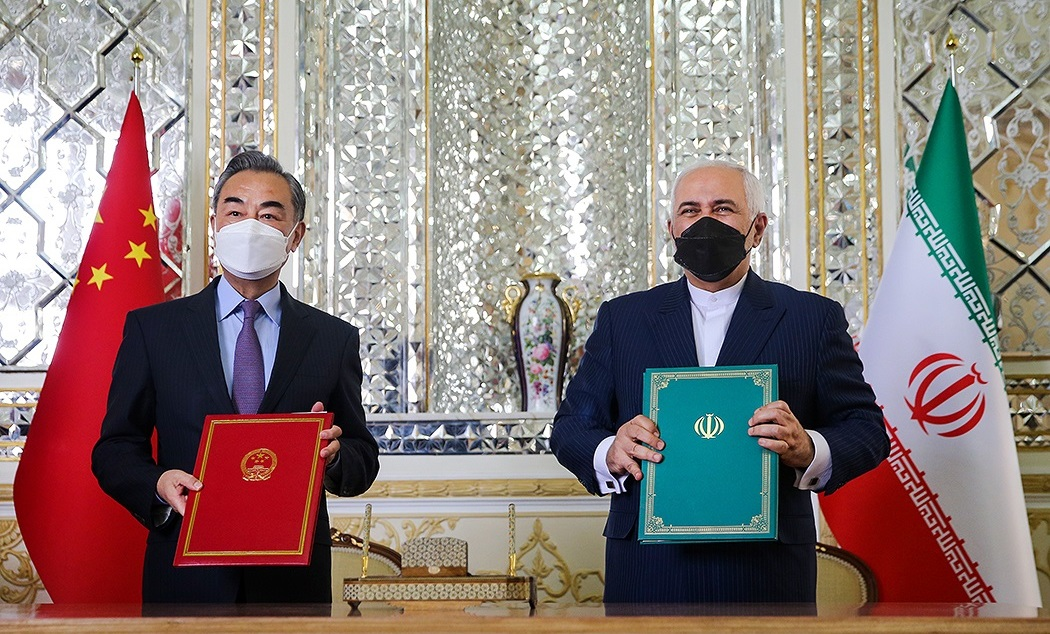
Wang and Iranian foreign minister Mohammad Javad Zarif signed a 25-year strategic cooperation agreement on 27 March 2021

Wang Yi took a leading role in negotiations between Iran and Saudi Arabia that resulted in the reestablishment of diplomatic relations. The meetings secretly took place in Beijing. Wang credited Xi with leading the talks. The CCP leader visited both nations prior to their joint meeting. Wang further stated that this achievement showed the value of using China as a mediator.

On 2 March 2026, Wang Yi held a series of high-level phone calls with his counterparts in Iran, Oman, and France to address the escalating conflict following U.S. and Israeli strikes on Iran. During a call with Iranian Foreign Minister Abbas Araghchi, Wang reaffirmed that China "supports Iran in defending its sovereignty, security, territorial integrity, and national dignity." He characterized the U.S.-Israeli military operations as a violation of international law and the UN Charter, particularly as they occurred during ongoing negotiations.

=== Canadian journalist incident ===
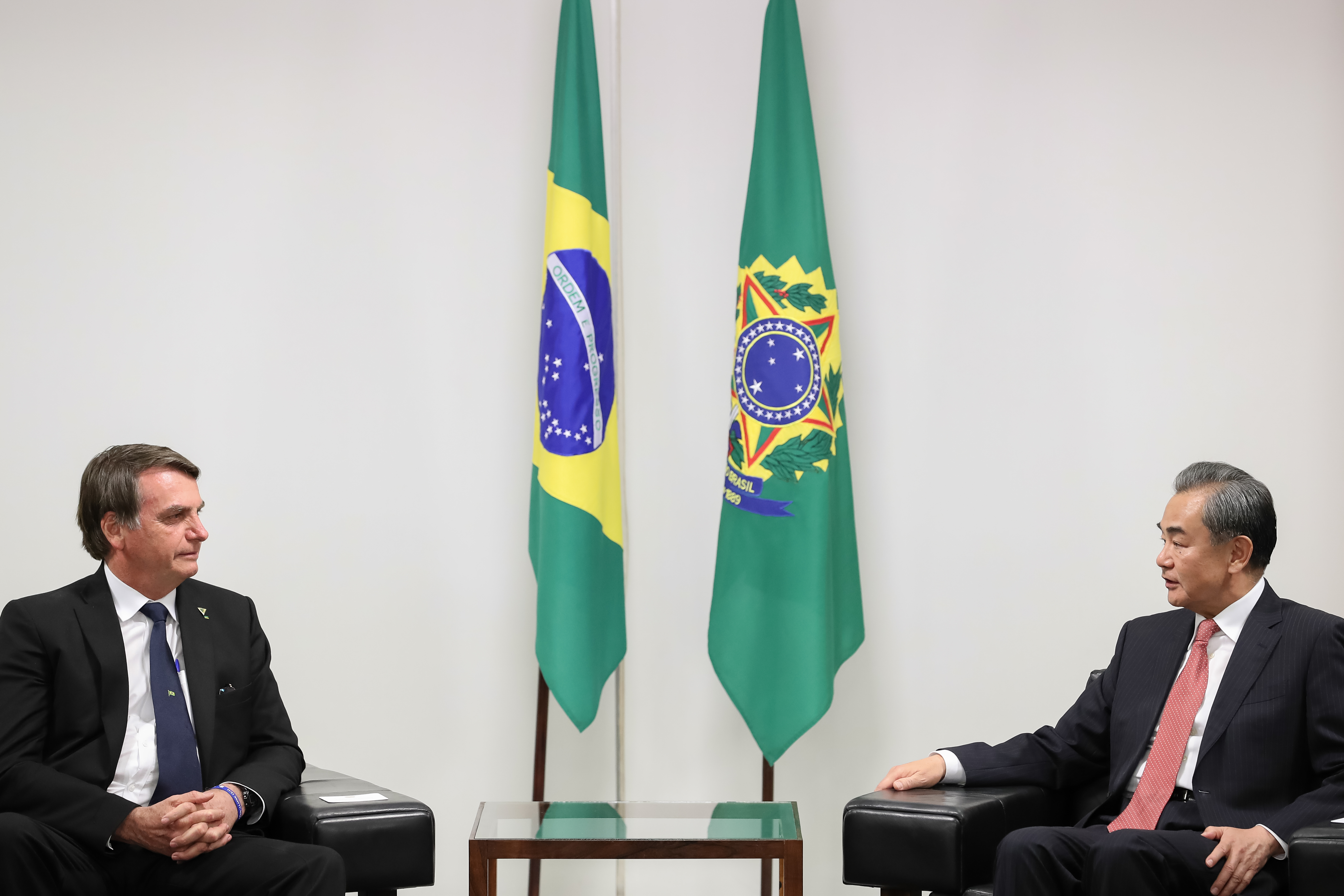
Wang with Brazilian president Jair Bolsonaro, Brasília, 25 July 2019

During a joint news conference in Ottawa on 1 June 2016, with Canadian Minister of Foreign Affairs Stéphane Dion, Wang responded to Canadian reporter Amanda Connolly of online news site iPolitics over a question she raised regarding human rights in China, saying "Your question is full of prejudice against China and arrogance ... I don't know where that comes from. This is totally unacceptable," and calling allegations of human rights violations in China "groundless accusations".

Afterwards, Wang became an internet celebrity on Sina Weibo. A fan club on Weibo devoted to Wang has more than 130,000 followers.

=== Diplomatic recognition of PRC ===
During his first tenure as foreign minister, Wang helped facilitate the diplomatic recognition of the People's Republic of China by Panama in 2017, the Dominican Republic and El Salvador in 2018, and the Solomon Islands in 2019, with all four nations ceasing relations with the Republic of China (Taiwan).

=== COVID-19 ===
It was reported that during Wang's visit to Norway in August 2020, he said that while China was the first country to report the existence of the virus to the World Health Organization, "it does not mean that the virus originated in China. Actually, for the past months, we have seen reports ... showing that the virus emerged in different parts of the world, and may have emerged earlier than in China".

=== United States ===
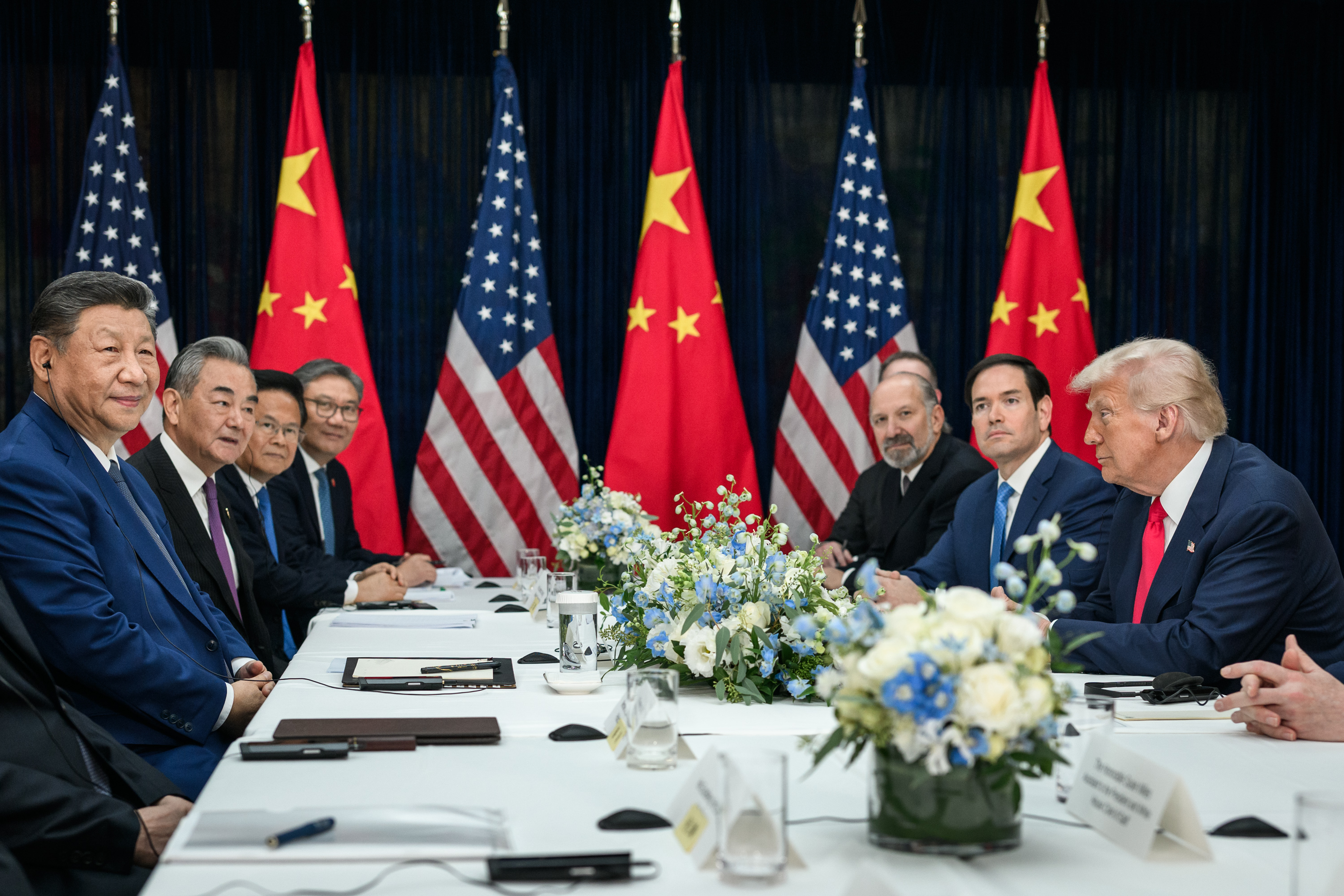
Wang looks on as Xi and Trump face off at the APEC South Korea Summit in Busan, 30 October 2025

On 22 February 2021, Wang urged the administration of US President Joe Biden to lift the sanctions on trade and people-to-people contact imposed by his predecessor, Donald Trump. At the Foreign Ministry forum on US-China relations, he said that the US "must not interfere in the internal affairs of China".

Wang criticized the speed and timing of the withdrawal of the American-led NATO forces from Afghanistan and urged them to withdraw in a "responsible and orderly manner".

In 2023 after the 2023 Chinese balloon incident, Wang Yi attended several secret meetings with Jake Sullivan to diffuse security issues.

During the March 2024 session of the National People's Congress, Wang Yi criticized the US for its fear of China. In Joe Biden's lame duck period, Wang gave a speech on China's expectations for America. He made clear that China will take an active role in global political issues and will continue to defend its claim to Taiwan.

Sino-American relations took a turn for the worse in 2025 due to a trade war and the US increasing support for Taiwan. Wang met in June and September with Marco Rubio and Adam Smith to encourage further dialog that could seek stability in the China-US relationship. Wang said "China and the United States are partners, rather than rivals and certainly not enemies". However, when asked in March about how China will engage with the second Trump administration, he stated "no country should fantasise that it can suppress China and maintain good relations with China at the same time."

=== Russia ===
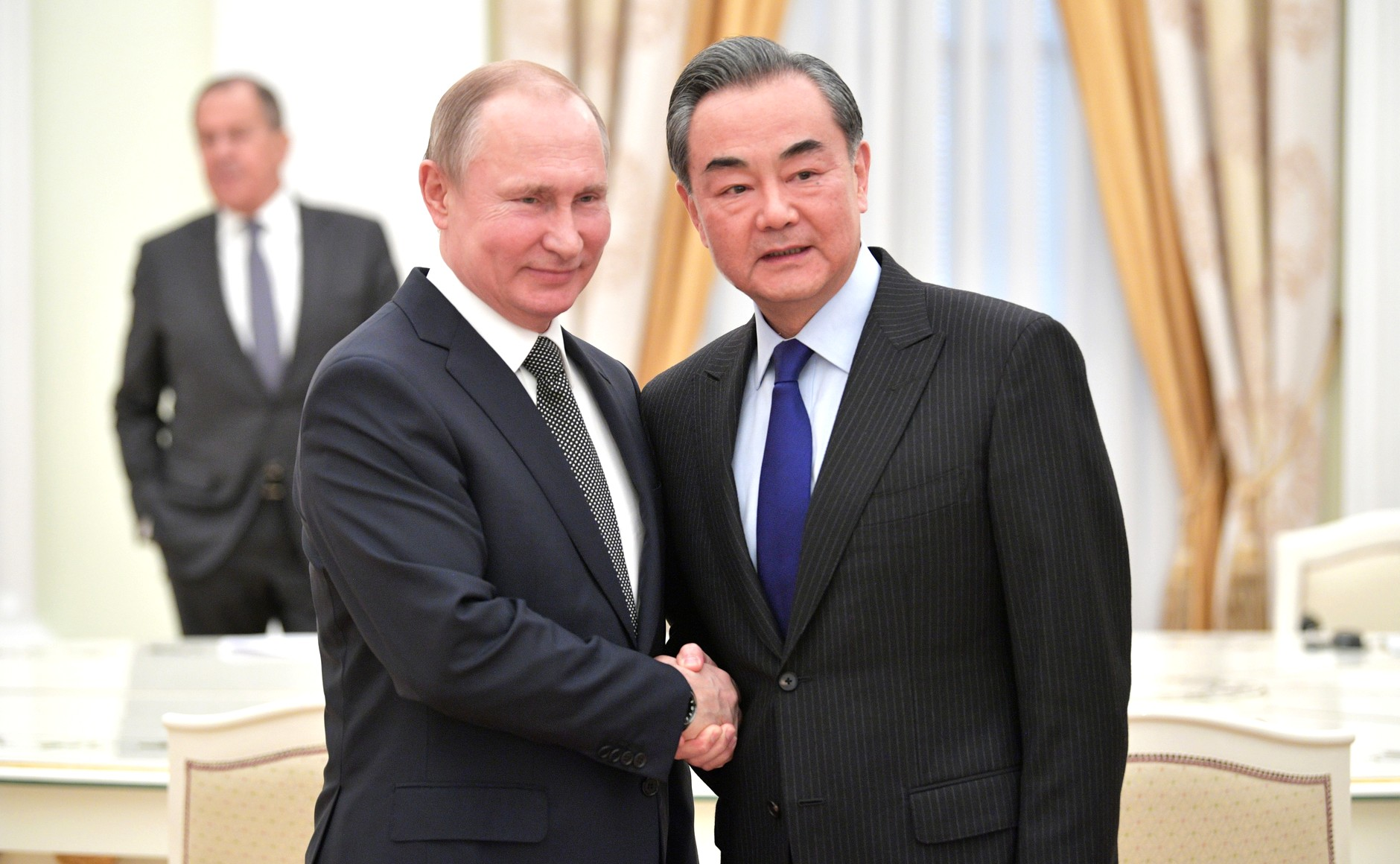
Wang with Russian president Vladimir Putin, 5 April 2018

In his 2022 meeting with Wang at the SCO, Russian foreign minister Sergey Lavrov attended praised the "traditional friendship" between Russia and China. Wang reaffirmed support for Russia, saying that China will "firmly support Russia, under the leadership of President Putin … to further establish Russia's status as a major power on the international stage".

==== Russo-Ukrainian war ====
In December 2022, Wang defended China's position on the Russo-Ukrainian War and said that China would "deepen strategic mutual trust and mutually beneficial cooperation" with Russia.

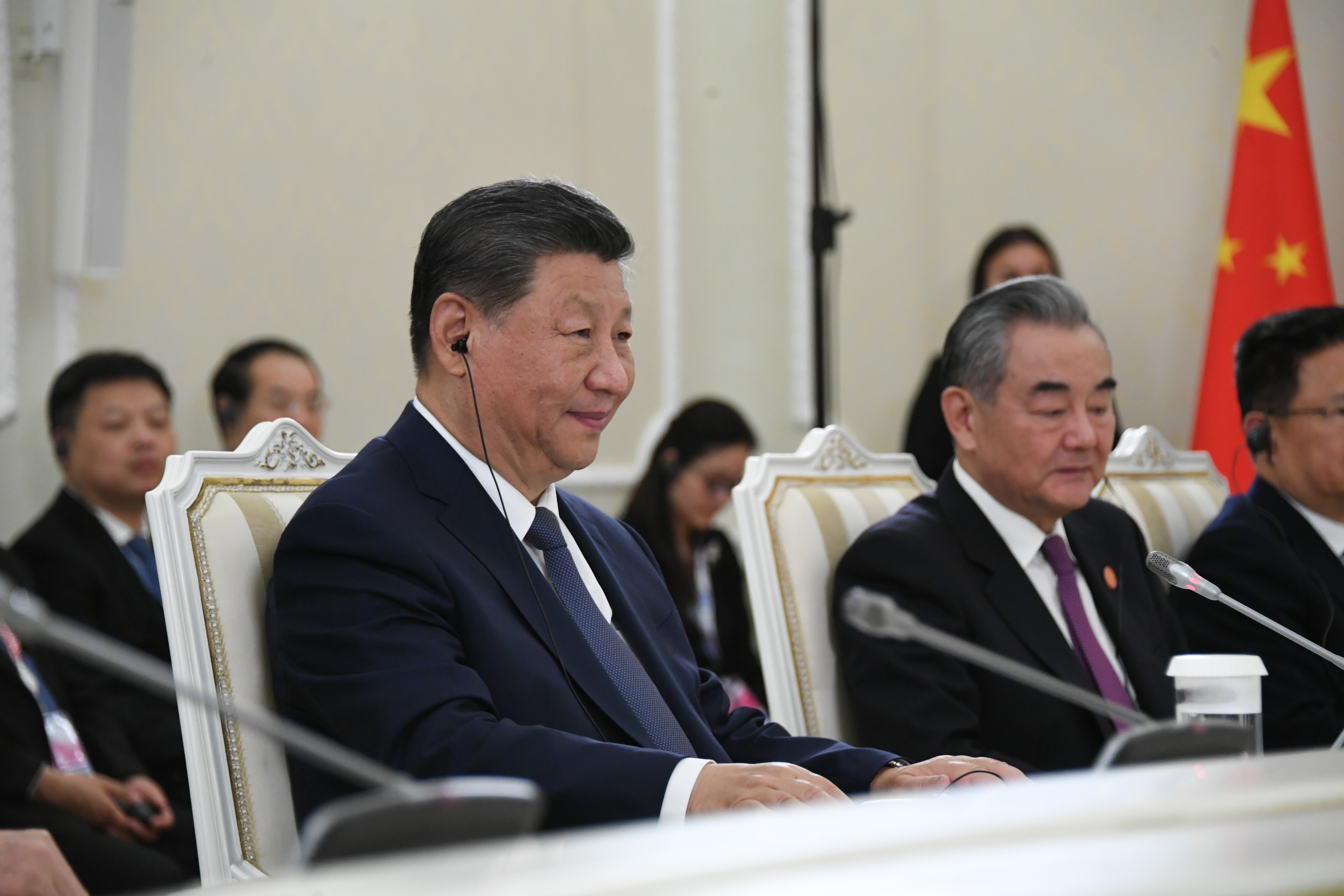
Wang and Xi at the 16th BRICS summit in Kazan, Russia, 22 October 2024

In February 2023, Wang announced his peace initiative for the Russian invasion of Ukraine at the 59th Munich Security Conference. Wang chose to have his Chargé d'affaires Dai Bing not present his peace plan at the 18th plenary meeting of the eleventh emergency special session of the United Nations General Assembly. He decided to have Dai mention his peace plan only by passing reference at the UN Security Council Briefing on Ukraine the next day, 24 February 2023.

While the plan attracted support from Hungarian Prime Minister Viktor Orbán, NATO Secretary-General Jens Stoltenberg said that the plan "doesn't have much credibility because [the Chinese] have not been able to condemn the illegal invasion of Ukraine."

On 23 July 2024, the Ukrainian foreign minister Dmytro Kuleba visited China for talks on ways to achieve a peaceful end to the war with Russia. This was the first such bilateral visit since 2012.

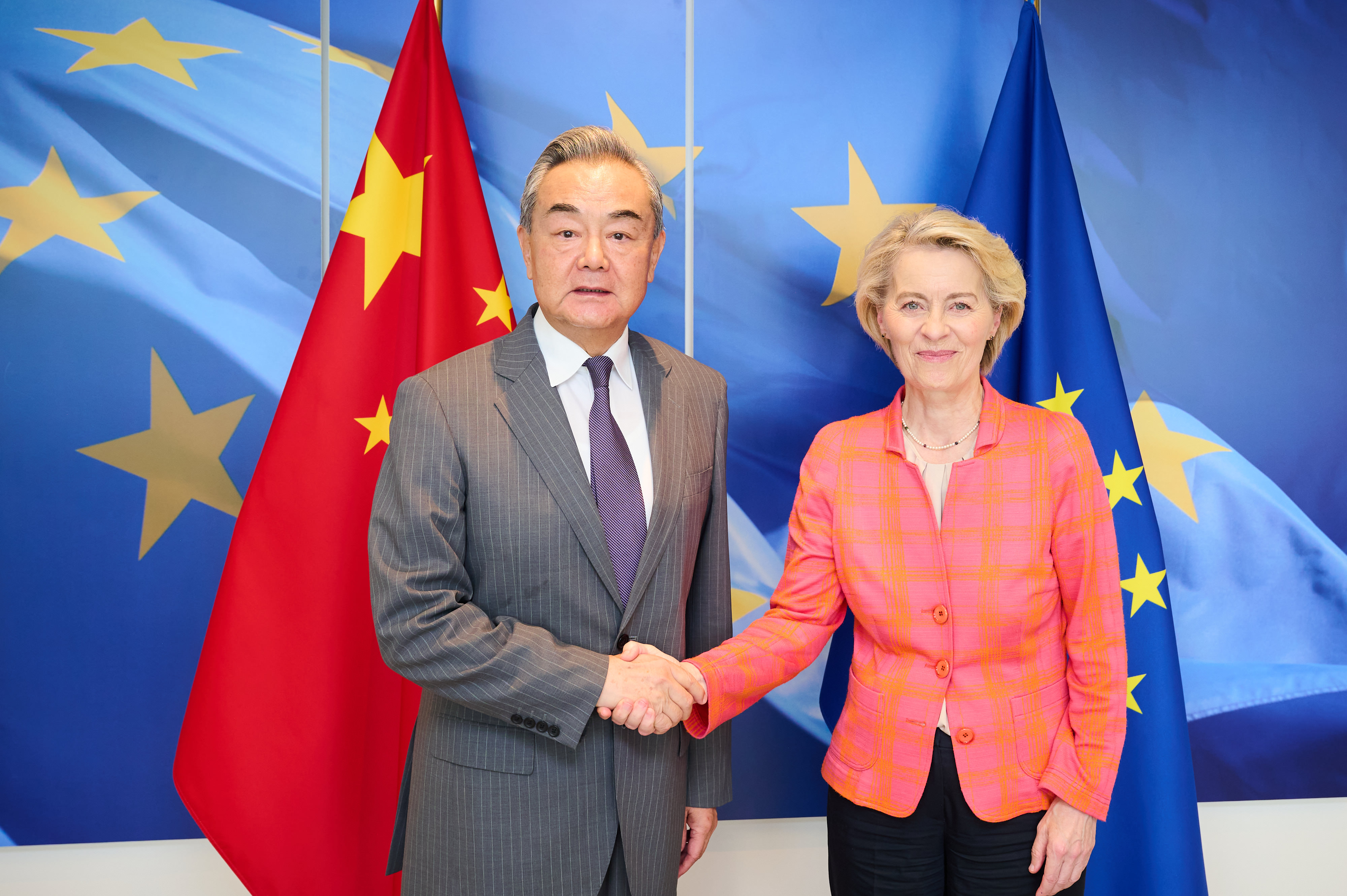
Wang Yi with the President of the European Commission Ursula von der Leyen, 4 July 2025

In July 2025 Wang Yi allegedly told European diplomats in an unofficial meeting that China does not want Russia to lose the war in Ukraine. The diplomats reported, China fears the United States could focus more on Asia, once the conflict in Europe is over. However, in China and Russia, an expert notes that the Ukraine conflict strained China's support for their bilateral partnership. Wang also gave more support for the EU's role in a potential Ukraine-Russia peace deal than the Trump administration supported.

=== Europe ===
In February 2025, Wang visited Ireland and England. The visit to England was part of an attempt by China to strengthen their relationship with the Starmer government.

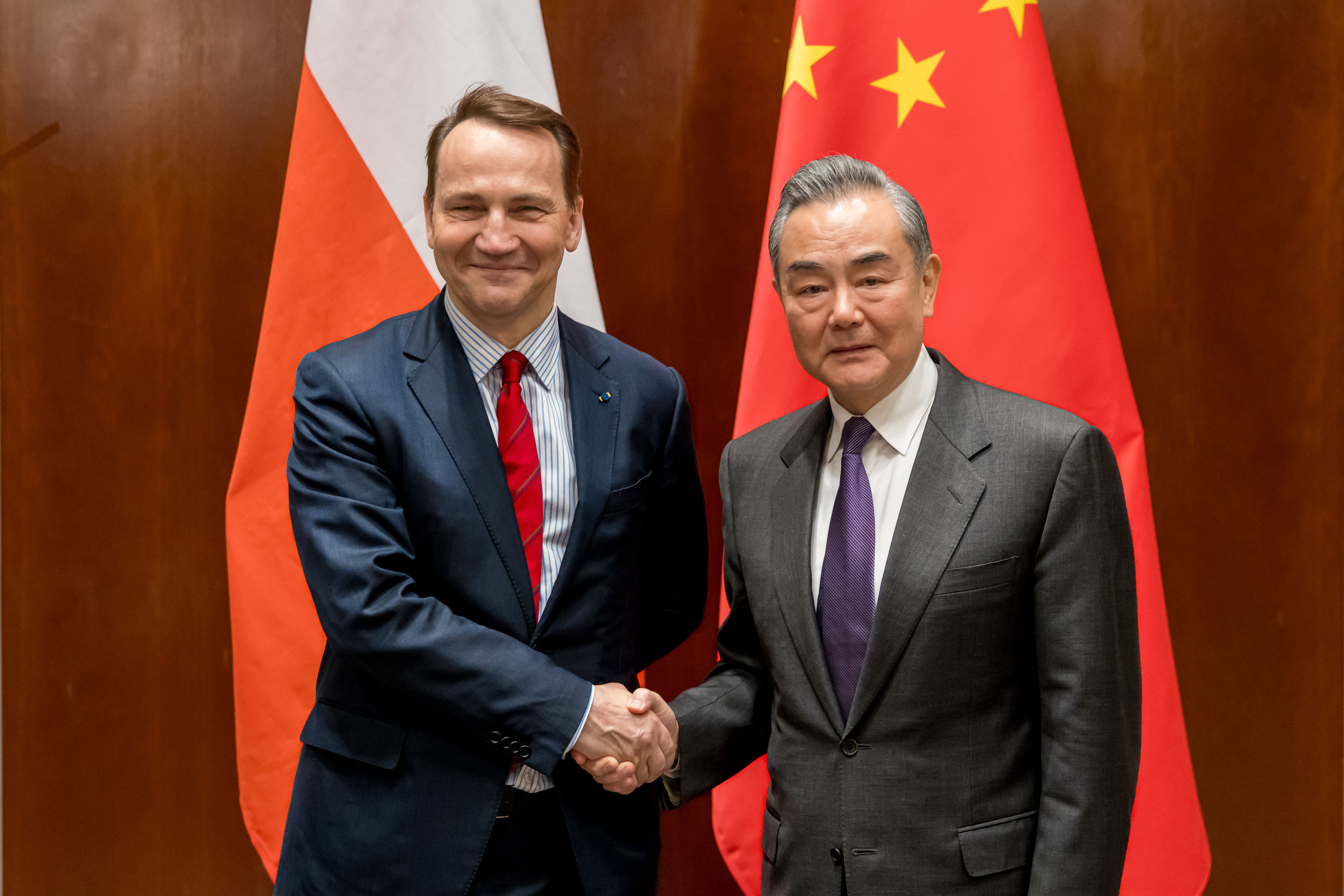
Wang with Polish foreign minister Radosław Sikorski, 17 February 2024

In the summer 2025, Wang toured several European nations in preparation for the 24 July China-EU summit in Anhui. Wang assured the EU that compliance with China's export controls would ensure steady access to the rare earth metals market that China dominates. The week of the summit, the EU introduced sanctions on Suifenhe Rural Commercial Bank and Heihe Rural Commercial Bank. According to the Financial Times, the banks "used crypto transactions to facilitate the import of goods covered by existing EU sanctions". The town of Suifenhe has long had a special relationship with Russia. Wang personally attempted to intervene in the EU decision to protect the Chinese banks. After the banking sanctions passed, China retaliated with sanctions on two Lithuanian banks. Lithuania, in particular, has challenged China's foreign and Taiwan policies. Wang stated, "It is a warning against other EU countries that may also violate the one-China principle or attempt to drag China into the Ukraine issue as a scapegoat. These measures are intended to deter and counteract such provocations." The summit was originally scheduled for two days with atypical access for EU leaders to Xi. However, Xi cut the meeting to a single day and only met with European Commission President Ursula von der Leyen. The summit highlighted a limited partnership between the two massive economies.

In the fall, Wang visited several European countries to advance China's foreign policies. In Italy, he discussed China's commitment to what China sees as fair and unrestricted trade. China is looking to raise foreign direct investment for its 15th Five-Year Plan. China's 2024 steel glut had caused the EU to take protective trade policies for its steel industry.

=== Venezuela ===
During Wang's tenure, China and Venezuela have deepened their ties. Venezuela was troubled by US sanctions, which Wang tried to mitigate through bilateral cooperation. He said Venezuela and China should work together to prevent hegemony from the global north. After the 2026 United States strikes in Venezuela Wang's foreign ministry stated "China strongly condemns the US’s blatant use of force against a sovereign state and action against its president."

== Party Activity ==
In March 2018, Wang was promoted as a State Councilor by the NPC.

In October 2022, following the 1st Plenary Session of the 20th CCP National Congress, Wang became a member of the Politburo of the CCP, even though he surpassed the informal retirement age of 68, being at the age of 69 at the time. He was succeeded as foreign minister by Qin Gang on 30 December 2022.

In March 2023, he was succeeded by Qin Gang as State Councilor after the first session of the 14th National People's Congress.

== Awards and decorations ==
- Hungary: Commander's Cross with Star of the Hungarian Order of Merit (2021)
- Kyrgyzstan: Medal of the Order of Danaker (2016)
- Mongolia: Medal of the Order of the Polar Star (2004)
- Pakistan: Hilal-e-Pakistan (2015)
- Uruguay: Medal of the Oriental Republic of Uruguay, twice (2016 and 2018)

== See also ==
- Foreign policy of Xi Jinping
- Xi Jinping Thought on Diplomacy
- List of current foreign ministers

Party political offices
| Preceded by Yang Jiechi | Director of the Office of the Central Foreign Affairs Commission; 2023–present | Incumbent |
Government offices
| Preceded by Yang Jiechi | Minister of Foreign Affairs; 2013–2022 | Succeeded by Qin Gang |
| Preceded by Qin Gang | Minister of Foreign Affairs; 2023–present | Incumbent |
Diplomatic posts
| Preceded by Wu Dawei | Chinese Ambassador to Japan; 2004–2007 | Succeeded by Cui Tiankai |
Order of precedence
| Preceded by He Lifeng as Member of the Politburo of the Chinese Communist Party | Order of precedence of China as Member of the Politburo of the Chinese Communist Party | Succeeded by Shi Taifeng as Member of the Politburo of the Chinese Communist Party |
