= Petlin =

Petlin is a surname. Notable people with the surname include:

- Irving Petlin (1934–2018), American artist and painter
- Ivan Petlin, 17th-century Siberian Cossack
