= Fyodor Baykov =

Russian diplomat (c. 1612–1663)

Fyodor Isakovich Baykov (Russian: Фёдор Исакович Байков, c. 1612 – c. 1663) was the first Russian envoy to China (1658). Like many later Russian ambassadors to China (Nicolae Milescu, Sava Vladislavich) he left a detailed account of his journey.

In 1654 Tsar Alexis sent Baykov to the court of the Shunzhi Emperor to negotiate a treaty establishing regular trade between Moscow and Beijing. (The first Russian to reach Peking was probably Ivan Petlin in 1618, but he was not properly an ambassador.)

At this time the Manchu Qing Dynasty had just been established and Russian adventurers had just entered the Amur River valley from the north, but the Manchus apparently did not understand that these barbarians from beyond Mongolia were the same as those who were raiding their northern frontier. The Russians of course knew the connection, but gave Baykov no instructions for dealing with the Amur problem. He was, however, instructed to make obeisance to no one but the emperor himself.

Before leaving Tobolsk, he sent Setkul Ablin ahead as messenger. Ablin reached Peking in late 1655, sold his trade goods and returned in the spring of 1656, passing, but not meeting, Baykov's party.

After a long stay at Tobolsk, Baykov's mission set out in June or autumn of 1654. He traveled up the Irtysh River across Dzungaria and the Gobi Desert. In 1655 they reached Kalgan on the Great Wall. Here he was stopped by the Chinese who did not know who he was (they thought Ablin had been the real ambassador). After receiving permission, he reached the Forbidden City on 3 March 1656.

He refused to kowtow at the city gate, but was admitted anyway and was housed by the Li-Fan Yuan. He insisted that his presents and credentials be presented to the emperor himself and in general did not behave with proper submissiveness to the great Chinese emperor. After several months of isolation, he was expelled from China's capital (in 1657 or 4 September 1656) and reached Moscow the following year.
