= Nikolai Spathari =

Moldavian writer, diplomat, and traveler

Nicolae Milescu
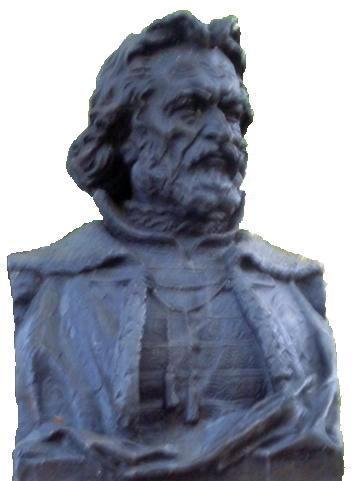
- A bust of Nicolae Milescu
- Born: 1636; Vaslui, Moldavia
- Died: 1708 (aged 71–72); Moscow, Tsardom of Russia
- Citizenship: Moldavia

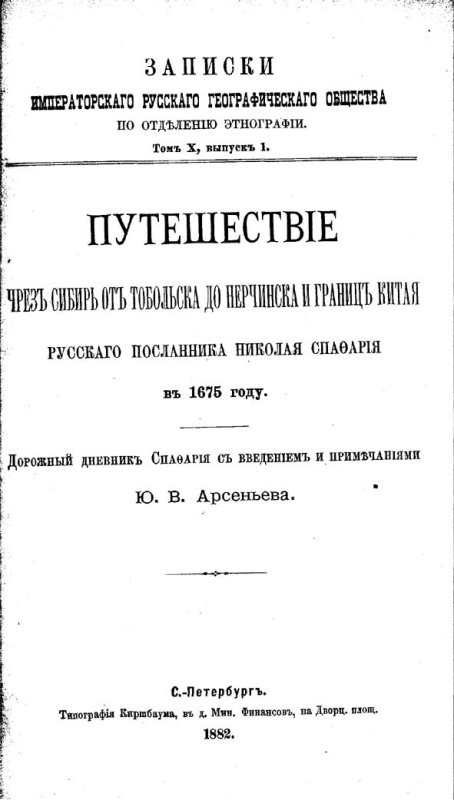
Travels through Siberia to the Chinese Borders, published in St. Petersburg in 1882.

Nikolai Spathari (Russian: Николай Гаврилович Спафарий, romanized: Nikolai Gavrilovich Spathari; 1636–1708), also known as Nicolae Milescu and Nicolae Milescu Spătaru (Romanian pronunciation: [nikoˈla.e miˈlesku spəˈtaru], first name also Neculai, signing in Latin as Nicolaus Spadarius Moldavo-Laco, Russian: Николае Гаврилович Милеску, romanized: Nikolaye Gavrilovich Milesku), or Spătarul Milescu-Cârnu (trans.: "Chancellor Milescu the Snub-nosed"), was a Moldavian-born writer, diplomat and traveler, who lived and worked in the Tsardom of Russia. He spoke nine languages: Romanian, Russian, Latin, both Attic and Modern Greek, French, German, Turkish and Swedish. One of his grandsons was the Spătar (Chancellor) Yuri Stefanovich, who came to Russia in 1711 with Dimitrie Cantemir.

== Early life ==
Spathari was born into a Greek family. His prosonym Moldavo-Lacone (Moldavan-Laconian) emphasizes his origins. The name Milescu was adopted by his parents when they settled in Milești. Prof. L. Turdeanu-Cartojan discovered at Oxford his autobiography, written in Greek (Λαζάρου, Lazarou).

A boyar born in Vaslui, Milescu studied at the Patriarchate College of Istanbul and, after returning to Iași, was appointed Chancellor for the Moldavian Prince Gheorghe Ștefan. In 1660–1664, he acted as representative of his country with its Ottoman overlord, and then as envoy to Berlin and Stockholm. He followed Gheorghe Ștefan in his exile to Stockholm and Szczecin (1664–1667) and visited Louis XIV's France in an attempt to get the king to assist him in creating an anti-Ottoman alliance.

== Exile ==
Milescu had ambitions of his own, and conspired against Prince Ștefăniță Lupu. As punishment, Ștefăniță ordered Milescu's nose to be cut off (the reason for Milescu's moniker). According to the unlikely account of chronicler Ion Neculce: "After [being mutilated], Nicolae the Snub-nosed fled to the German Land and found himself a doctor there, who repeatedly drew blood out of his cheeks and sculptured his nose, and thus day by day the blood coagulated, leading to his healing".

Milescu again left for Istanbul, where he received a letter from the Russian Tsar Aleksey I, who appointed him chief translator and diplomat at the Foreign Ministry in 1671. Milescu arrived in Russia together with Patriarch Dositheos II of Jerusalem. In 1674, he is shown as leading negotiations with both Wallachia and Moldavia, trying to rally them in the Russian-led anti-Ottoman projects. In 1695, Milescu took part in Peter the Great's Azov campaigns.

One of Milescu's tasks was to reinforce the legitimacy of the Romanov dynasty. To this end, he asserted that the Tsar was a successor to both the Roman and Byzantine emperors. In Vasiliologion ("Book of Rulers", 1674), he wrote that tsarist rule was derived from God, whose representative on earth was the Tsar. The work included short biographies of famous rulers, culminating with Michael Romanov and Aleksey, but also including Ivan the Terrible, Dmitry Donskoy, Alexander Nevsky, Byzantine emperors Constantine and Theodosius, and Augustus and Julius Caesar from Rome. Significantly, he included the feeble-minded Feodor Ivanovich, whose reign was considerably less illustrious, but who had to be mentioned in order to demonstrate dynastic continuity.

In Khrismologion ("Book of Prophecy", 1672) he analyzed commentary on the four kingdoms of Daniel prophecy, concluding that, due to its connection with Constantinople, Russia was the only true successor to the fourth kingdom, Rome. Going further, he asserted that the right of Roman succession belonged only to Russia, and not to the Holy Roman Empire. In setting forth his claim, he made reference to Anna Porphyrogenita, the sister of Byzantine emperor Basil II, who married Vladimir the Great. In his view, this union not only reinforced the strong connection between Byzantium and Russia, but also drew a dynastic line between Vladimir and Aleksey.

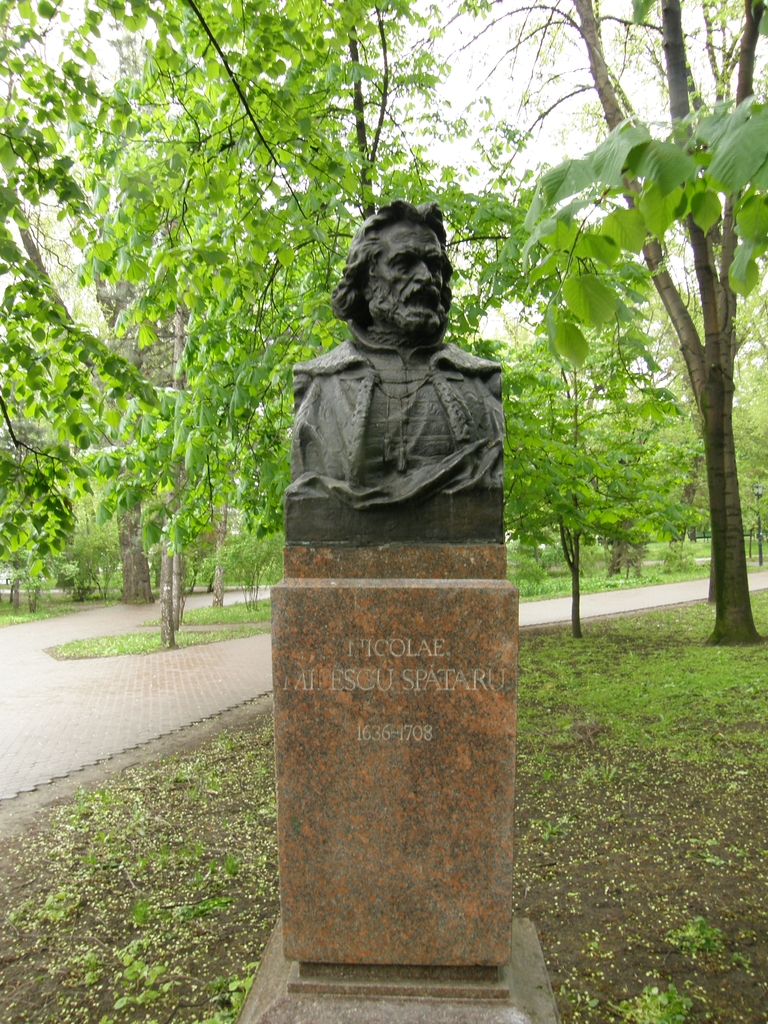
A bust of Nicolae Milescu in the Alley of Classics of Chișinău

== In China ==
In 1675, he was named ambassador of the Russian Empire to Beijing, the capital of Qing China, returning in 1678. At the head of a 150-strong expedition that had a military component (meant to fend off possible attacks by a hostile indigenous population), Milescu had as his main tasks the settlement of several border incidents between Russia and China, the establishment of permanent trade relations with China, and the survey of the newly incorporated Russian lands along the Amur River. The previous Muscovite embassy to China, led by Fyodor Baykov in 1656-56, had failed to achieve these objectives.

The embassy behave more as a geographical expedition, as well as a military reconnaissance mission, ethnographic research trip, and diplomatic encounter. It lasted more than two years, in which around 200 men crossed Russia and China.

Unlike previous Russians who had gone through Mongolia, Milescu chose to travel through Siberia as far as Nerchinsk, directly north of Peking. Upon reaching Yeniseysk, Milescu sent one of his men, Ignatiy Milovanov, to the Chinese court in order to inform the Kangxi Emperor about the purpose of their embassy. Milovanov was the first European known to have crossed the Amur (Heilong) River, reaching Beijing by the shortest route possible. Milescu followed the same route to the Chinese border, and established his camp on the Nen River in Heilongjiang, waiting for news from Milovanov. The latter returned to the camp on 18 February and, taking Milescu's report to the Tsar with him, proceeded to Moscow. Milescu, on the other hand, crossed into Beijing via Hebei in the middle of May, after being held up for two months at Kalgan (modern Zhangjiakou). Here he was able to communicate in Latin with the Jesuit Ferdinand Verbiest. His diplomacy proved unsuccessful, and he returned to Siberia by the same route in Spring 1677.

== Achievements ==
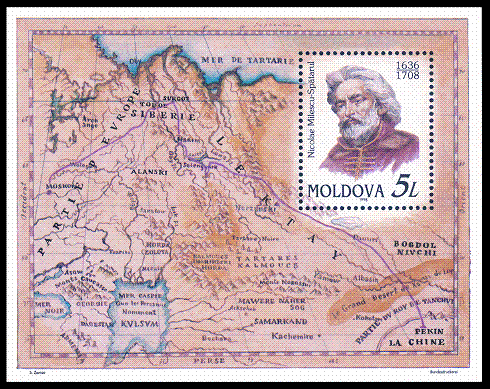
Nicolae Milescu Spătaru on a 1998 stamp of Moldova

Milescu is the author of one of the first Russian works on arithmetic, "Arithmologion", which was written in 1672, based on his own Greek original. The manuscript was preserved in the Chudov Monastery, till it was discovered by church historian Nikolay Kedrov.

In his road journal, later published under the title Travels through Siberia to the Chinese borders, Milescu correctly described the middle course of the Ob, Irtysh, and Angara rivers. He assumed the Ob to have its source in Lake Teletskoye in the Altai Mountains. He was also the first person to describe Lake Baikal and all the rivers feeding the lake, and the first to point out Baikal's unfathomable depth. His works became popular with Russian elites, being found in their collections for the next century.

On his way through Siberia, Milescu used the astrolabe to establish coordinates of some settlements. His materials were later used by the Jesuits, who took considerable interest in China. Upon returning to Moscow, he submitted to the Foreign Ministry three volumes of notes: Travel notes and Description of China, alongside the Travels.

In his narratives, Milescu summed up the knowledge that Russian explorers had gathered about East Siberia. Although he believed that the Amur was the largest river in the world, he listed its main tributaries without mistake. His idea that there was a vast mountain range stretching from the Baikal to the Okhotsk Sea, although fundamentally wrong, was widely believed by many geographers until the mid-20th century. He also heard rumours about Sakhalin, which he supposed to be the same island as Hokkaido, thus considerably exaggerating its dimensions.

Bogdan Petriceicu-Hasdeu believed that Milescu was the author of the first translation of the Bible into Romanian, the Bucharest edition (printed in 1688, during the rule of Prince Șerban Cantacuzino). However, Nicolae Iorga and other historians have argued that there is no actual proof of this, and have proposed Constantin Cantacuzino as the main translator.

== Legacy ==
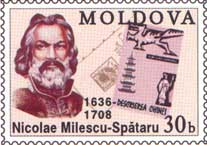
Nicolae Milescu Spătaru on a 2002 stamp of Moldova

Milescu's name was assigned to several streets in localities throughout Romania and Moldova, including one in Bucharest named "Strada Spatărul Nicolae Milescu", one in Chișinău named "Strada Nicolae Milescu Spătaru", one in Constanța named "Strada Nicolae Milescu", etc. Also there are scientific and educational institutions named in Milescu's honor, among them a lyceum in Chișinău, Liceul Teoretic "Nicolae Milescu Spătarul", and the Association of Scientists of Moldova "N. Spătaru Milescu". Several busts of Milescu are across Romanian and Moldovan cities. The public library in Vaslui, his birthplace, bears his name. Also in Moldova several stamps with Milescu on them were issued. In 2011, the National Bank of Romania issued a silver coin dedicated to the 375th anniversary of Nicolae Milescu's birth.

== See also ==
- Pedro Cubero
- Bible translations into Romanian
