= China and Russia =

2023 book by Philip Snow

China and Russia: Four Centuries of Conflict and Concord
- Language: English
- Subject: Geopolitics
- Genre: Nonfiction
- Published: 25 April 2023
- Publisher: Yale University Press
- Publication place: United States
- Media type: Hardcover
- Pages: 624
- ISBN: 978-0300166651

China and Russia: Four Centuries of Conflict and Concord is a non-fiction book by Philip Snow.

== Background ==
The book examines the historical relationship between China and Russia over a span of four centuries. The book delves into the complex dynamics of their interactions as geopolitical powers with ideological differences, including their periods of conflict and periods of cooperation in Central Asia and the Far East. The book took nearly half a century to complete, and its origins can be traced back to a paper titled "Sino-Russian Relations from 1644 to the Present," which was originally written as part of Snow's final exams at the University of Oxford in the mid-1970s.

== Reception ==
Writing for The Telegraph (London), Christopher Harding writes, "Snow's ambitious, wide-ranging history covers everything from Mao's fraught relationship with Stalin to Tolstoy's interest in Daoism."

Peter Gordon, the editor of the Asian Review of Books writes, "Snow himself is somewhat reticent to nail those patterns down but the overall impression is of a relatively feckless, ambivalent and inconsistent Russia compared with a more self-aware, clear- (if often steely-) eyed China, even during those periods when Russia seemed to hold the upper hand. Whether as cause or consequence, the book is written somewhat more from China’s perspective than Russia’s."

Denis Staunton, the China Correspondent of The Irish Times writes, “Snow navigates this huge panorama with a fluency and a lightness of touch that makes his book a wonderfully readable guide.”

Jerry Lenaburg writes for the New York Journal of Books, "Philip Snow offers a comprehensive history of the constantly changing, always tumultuous, and ever complicated interactions between these two countries that share the world’s sixth largest border. This is an incredibly timely book."
