= Setkul Ablin =

Setkul Ablin (flourished ca. 1653–1672) was a trader who thrice journeyed from Russia to China as a Russian agent. He was called a 'Bukharan' but the Russians used this term loosely for any trader from Central Asia.

About 1653 he was chosen by Fyodor Baykov, the Russian ambassador to China, to go ahead of him and announce his coming. Ablin left with a caravan of trade goods, principally furs. When he arrived in Peking in late 1655 the Chinese thought he was the real ambassador. He traded most of his goods, left Peking in the spring of 1656 and passed Baykov on the steppe without meeting him.

Since he had succeeded where Baykov had failed, in 1658 he was again sent to China along with Ivan Perfilev. He returned in 1662 after having most of his goods stolen by the Oirats.

In 1668-72 he went again. He spent a month in Peking and was presented to the Kangxi Emperor. The Chinese complained to him about the behavior of the Russians on the Amur (they had not previously understood that these Russians from the far west were the same people as those who were raiding along their northern border). On his return to Russia, he had made 18,000 rubles on an initial investment of 4,500.
