= Ivan Petlin =

17th-century Russian explorer

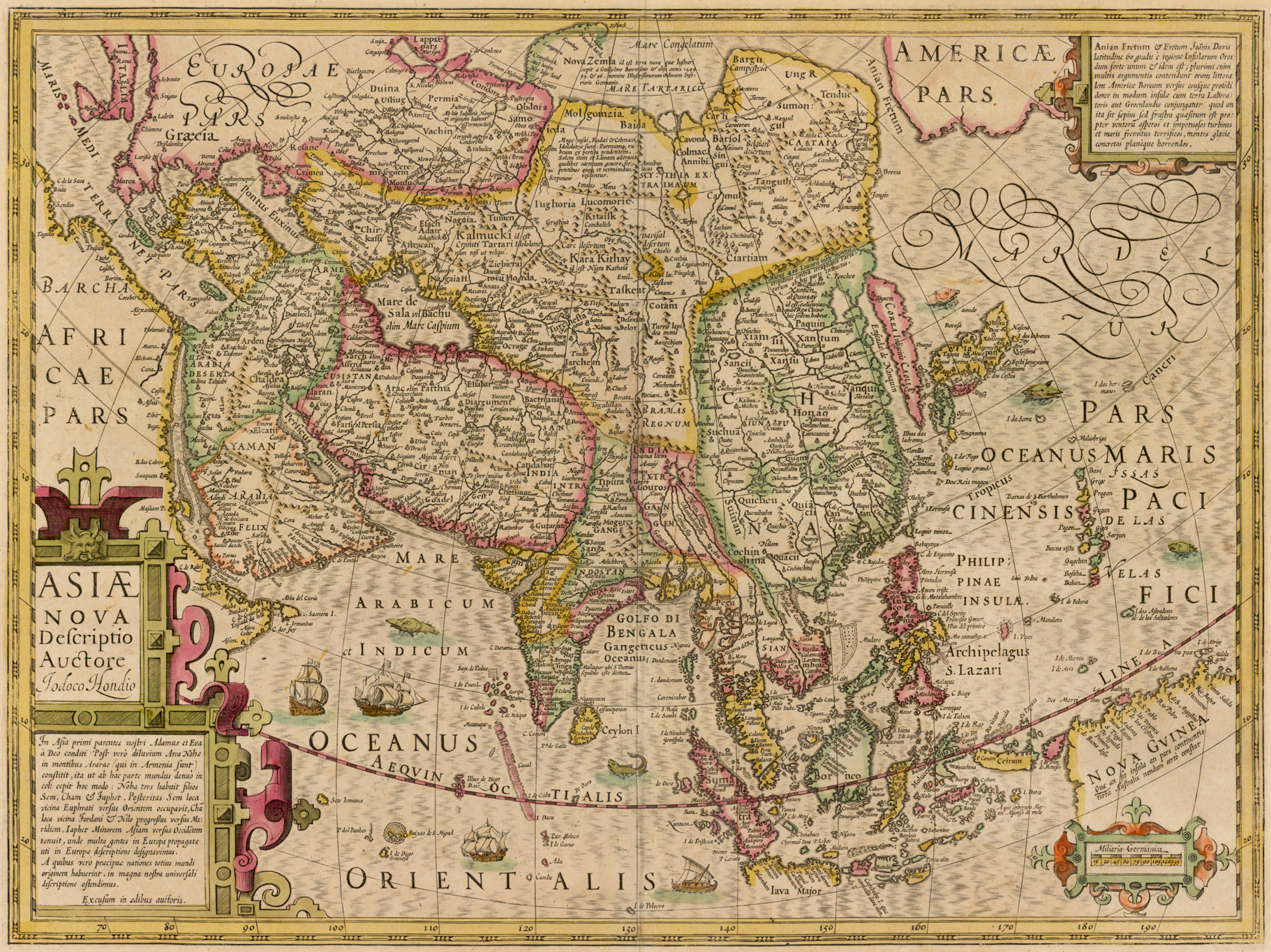
Around the time of Petlin's travel, Europeans were aware that the country of Kitaisk, with the capital in Combalich, was adjacent to southern Siberia, and maybe even accessible via the Ob River, but did not necessarily identify it either with Marco Polo's Cataia (capital, Cambalu) or with China (capital, Paquin). (Map by Jodocus Hondius, 1610)

Ivan Petlin (Russian: Иван Петлин), also known by the diminutive form Ivashko or Evashko Petlin (Russian: Ивашко Петлин), was the first Russian to have reached China on an official mission (1618–1619). He was a Siberian Cossack. His expedition may have been the second European expedition to reach China from the west by an overland route (after that of Bento de Góis) since the fall of the Yuan Dynasty.

== Career ==
Although sent by the tsar, he was not officially an ambassador. The mission was outfitted by the Tobolsk and Tomsk governors (voyevodas). Petlin was originally appointed as translator and scribe under Maksim Trupcheninov, but at the last minute Trupcheninov was unable to go so Petlin became leader. His traveling companion was named Andrei Mundov (Mundoff).

Accompanied by two returning envoys from the Altyn Khan who was one of leader of Western Mongolia, Petlin and Mundov left Tomsk on 9 May 1618 and went south up the Ob River, crossed the Abakan Range, went south to Tuva and around Lake Ubsa to the court of the Altyn Khan.

Petlin's report is quite vague. He mentions: the upper Ob; rivers flowing into Lake Ubsa; the local rulers across Mongolia; a Princess Malchikatun who rules the towns of Mongolia and issues permits to cross the Great Wall; the Black Mongols west of the wall and the Yellow Mongols east of it; an 'Iron Tsar' near Bukhara who sends diamonds to China (probably, a reference to the Kashgarian jade tribute trade); the Great Wall (which he thinks runs from the Pacific to Bukhara); several Chinese cities on the way to Peking; Peking; and an 'Ob River' which he seems to think flows from western Mongolia to the Yellow Sea. He mentions lamas, temples with gilded statues, city walls and gates, paved streets and officials who go about with yellow sunshades over their heads. Throughout he emphasizes the remarkable fact that cities are built of stone.

An account of Petlin's expedition was translated into English and published in Samuel Purchas' "Pilgrims" (vol. XIV) (1625); it was apparently well known in the 17th century England: e.g., John Milton is thought to have drawn on it in his description of Mongolia.
