= List of modern Mongol clans =

This is a list of modern Mongolian clans. A list of family names in Mongolia, which only includes the main clans of Mongolian citizens, not including other Mongols outside Mongolia. The population of Mongolia is made up of all Mongol ethnic groups, tribes and aimags. The largest group is the Khalkhas, followed by the Oirats and Buryats. A small number of Kazakh and Inner Mongol tribes are also included.

== Khalkha clans ==
=== A ===
Aduuchin, Alag Aduut, Arulat

=== B ===
Balj, Barlas (Barulas), Borjigin, Besud, Buyant

=== C ===
Chonos

=== D ===
Daguur, Darkhad, Dolood (Dughlats)

=== E ===
Eljigin

=== G ===
Gorlos

=== J ===
Jalaid, Jalair, Jurkhin

=== K ===
Kharchu, Kharnut, Khatagin, Kharnuud, Khitan (Kidan), Khoroo, Khotogoid, Khökhuid, Khuree, Khereid, Keregut, Khurts

=== N ===
Naiman, Nirun

=== O ===
Olkhonud (Olkhonuud, Olkhunud, Olkhunuud), Ongud, Orosynkhon

=== S ===
Saljud, Suldus, Sharaid, Sharnuud

=== T ===
Taij, Taijiud, Taijuud, Taichuud, Tatar, Togoruutan, Torghut

=== U ===
Uriankhai

=== Y ===
Yamaat, Yesüd (Yesüüd), Yunsheebuu (Southern Mongols)

== Buryat clans ==
=== A ===
Ashibagad

=== B ===
Baatud, Barga (Bayirqu), Bulagad, Batanai (Batnai), Bodonguud

=== C ===
Chonos

=== E ===
Ekhired, Ensheebu

=== K ===
Khamnigan, Khargana, Khori, Khongoodor, Khubduud

=== O ===
Orlug, Orlugud, Orlut, Orluud, Orluut

=== S ===
Sagaanguud, Sartuul, Sharaid, Sharnuud, Songol

=== U ===
Uriankhad, Uriankhai, Uriankhan

=== Y ===
Yunsheebu

==== Khamnigan clans ====
Altankhan, Huuchid

== Daur clans ==
=== D ===
Daguur; Dular

== Oirat clans ==
=== Bayad clans ===
The Bayad (Mongol: Баяд/Bayad, lit. "the Riches") is the third largest subgroup of the Mongols in Mongolia and they are a tribe in Four Oirats. Bayads were a prominent clan within the Mongol Empire. Bayads can be found in both Mongolic and Turkic peoples. Within Mongols, the clan is spread through Khalkha, Inner Mongolians, Buryats and Oirats.

=== Khoton clans ===
Burut

=== Myangad clans ===
Barga; Onhod (Ongut)

=== Zakhchin clans ===
Aatiinkhan; Adsagiinkhan; Baykhiinkhan; Burd Tariachin; Donjooniikhon; Damjaaniikhan; Dumiyenkhen; Emchiinkhen; Khereid; Khotonguud; Khurmshtiinkhan; Mukhlainkhan; Nokhoikhon; Shurdaankhan; Tavagzaaniikhan; Tsagaan Yas, Khuu Noyod.

=== Other Oirat clans ===
==== A ====
Altai

==== B ====
Bayad, Baatud

==== C ====
Choros (Tsoros)

==== D ====
Darkhad, Darkhan, Dzungar, Dorbet

==== K ====
Khoid, Khoton

==== M ====
Myangad

=== N ===
Naiman

==== O ====
Oirat, Olet, Olot, Oold

==== T ====
Torghut, Tumed

==== U ====
Uriankhai, Ulud, Uuld

==== Z ====
Zaisan, Zakhchin

== Southern Mongolian clans ==
=== A ===
Alagui

=== B ===
Bayud (Bayads); Burde

=== M ===
Manggud (Manghud)

=== T ===
Tunggaid (Modern Khereid)

=== U ===
Uushin

== Mongolian Tuva Tsaatan-Dukha ==
Urud (Mongol)

== Mongolian Tuva clans ==
Ak irgit; Kizil soyon; (Olot)

== Yugur clans ==
Arlat (Arulad); Kalka (Khalkha Mongols); Oirot (Oirats); Temurchin (Mongol)

== Other Mongolic clans ==
=== C ===
- Chantuu (Mongolized Uzbeks and Uyghurs)

=== K ===
- Khasag, Khasaguud or Khasguud (Mongolized Kazakhs)
- Kalmyks (Kalmyk: Хальмгуд, Xaľmgud, Mongolian: Халимагууд, Halimaguud; Russian: Калмыки, romanized: Kalmyki) Their ancestors moved from Dzungaria to Kalmykia in Russia and Kyrgyzstan. They had created the Kalmyk Khanate from 1630 to 1771.

=== M ===
- Moghol people
- Mughal people (Urdu-speaking Mongols)

== See also ==
- List of medieval Mongolian tribes and clans
- List of Mongol states
- List of Mongol rulers
- Mongolian name
- Surnames by country § Mongolia
- List of Mongolians
