= Mongols =

East Asian ethnic group

Монголчууд Mongolchuud ᠮᠣᠩᠭᠣᠯᠴᠤᠳ
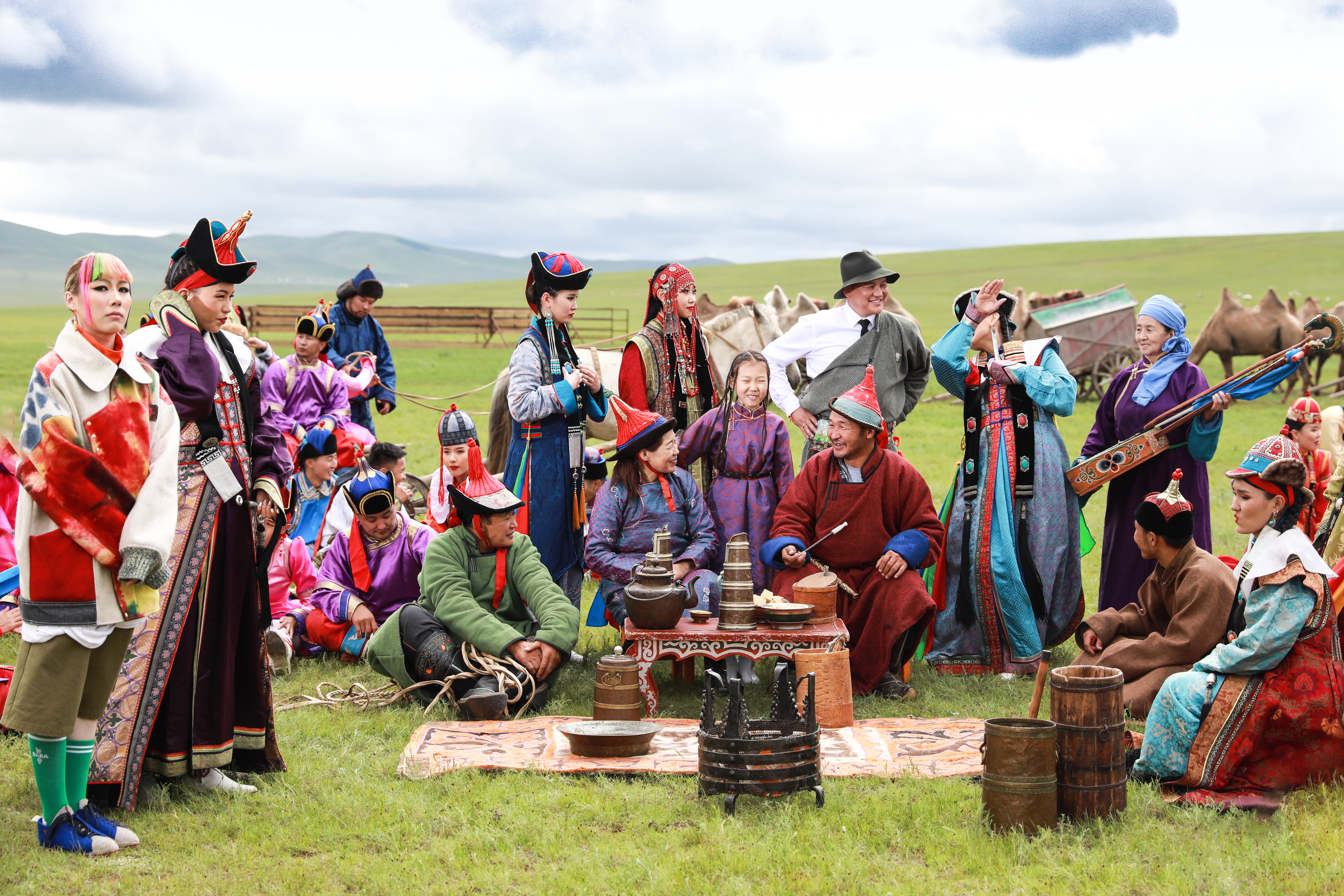
- Mongols in traditional dress during the Naadam festival

Total population
- c. 10 million

Regions with significant populations
- China: 6,290,204
- Mongolia: 3,046,882
- Russia: 651,355
- South Korea: 37,963
- Japan: 20,416
- United States: 19,170
- Kyrgyzstan: 12,000
- Czech Republic: 10,236
- Canada: 9,090
- Kazakhstan: 7,218
- Sweden: 6,992
- Australia: 5,538
- Germany: 3,972
- France: 3,102
- Turkey: 2,716
- Austria: 2,658

Languages
- Mongolian and other Mongolic languages Mandarin Chinese · Russian

Religion
- Predominantly: Tibetan Buddhism · Mongolian shamanism (Tengrism); Minorities: Christianity (Protestant · Orthodox · Catholic) · Sunni Islam

Related ethnic groups
- Other Mongolic peoples

The Mongols (Note: (Mongolian: Монголчууд, ᠮᠣᠩᠭᠣᠯᠴᠤᠳ, Mongolchuud, [ˈmɔɴ.ɢɔɬ.t͡ʃot]; Chinese: 蒙古族; pinyin: Ménggǔ zú; Russian: Монголы, romanized: Mongoly)) are an East Asian ethnic group native to Mongolia and China (Inner Mongolia and other 11 autonomous territories), as well as parts of southern Siberia. The Mongols are the principal member of the large family of Mongolic peoples. The Oirats and the Buryats are classified either as distinct ethno-linguistic groups or as subgroups of Mongols.

The Mongols are bound together by a common heritage and ethnic identity, descending from the Proto-Mongols. Their indigenous dialects are collectively known as the Mongolian language. The contiguous geographical area in which the Mongols primarily live is referred to as the Mongol heartland, especially in discussions of the Mongols' history under the Mongol Empire and Northern Yuan.

== Etymology ==
There are several proposals for the etymology of the ethnonym "Mongol":

- A change from Mongkhe-tengri-gal ("Eternal Sky Fire");
- A derivation from the personal name, transcribed in Chinese-language sources as 木骨閭 Mùgǔlǘ (from Middle Chinese *muwk-kwot-ljo), of the progenitor of the Rouran Khaganate.

The designation "Mongol" first appeared in the mid-10th century Chinese Old Book of Tang to describe a tribe of the Shiwei who resided in the Argun River basin in the 9th century. In the 13th century, the word Mongol grew into an umbrella term for a large group of Mongolic-speaking tribes united under the rule of Genghis Khan.

The Mongols of the Mongol Empire were known in Central Asia, Western Asia and Europe as "Tatars", after a tribal confederation that was active on the Mongolian Steppes in the 12th century. In the Islamic world, the Mongols were known as "Turks".

== History ==
=== Prehistoric background ===
The ethnogenesis of Mongolic peoples is largely linked with the expansion of Ancient Northeast Asians. The Mongolian pastoralist lifestyle may in part be derived from the Western Steppe Herders, but without much geneflow between these two groups, suggesting cultural transmission.

=== Early historical background ===
In various times Mongolic peoples have been equated with the Scythians, the Magog, and the Tungusic peoples. Based on Chinese historical texts the ancestry of the Mongolic peoples can be traced back to the Donghu, a nomadic confederation occupying eastern Mongolia and Manchuria. The Donghu neighboured the Xiongnu, whose identity is still debated today. Although some scholars maintain that they were proto-Mongols, they were more likely a multi-ethnic group of Mongolic and Turkic tribes. It has been suggested that the language of the Huns was related to the Xiongnu.

The Donghu, however, can be much more easily labeled proto-Mongol since the Chinese histories trace only Mongolic tribes and kingdoms (Xianbei and Wuhuan peoples) from them, although some historical texts claim a mixed Xiongnu-Donghu ancestry for some tribes (e.g. the Khitan).

=== In the Chinese classics ===
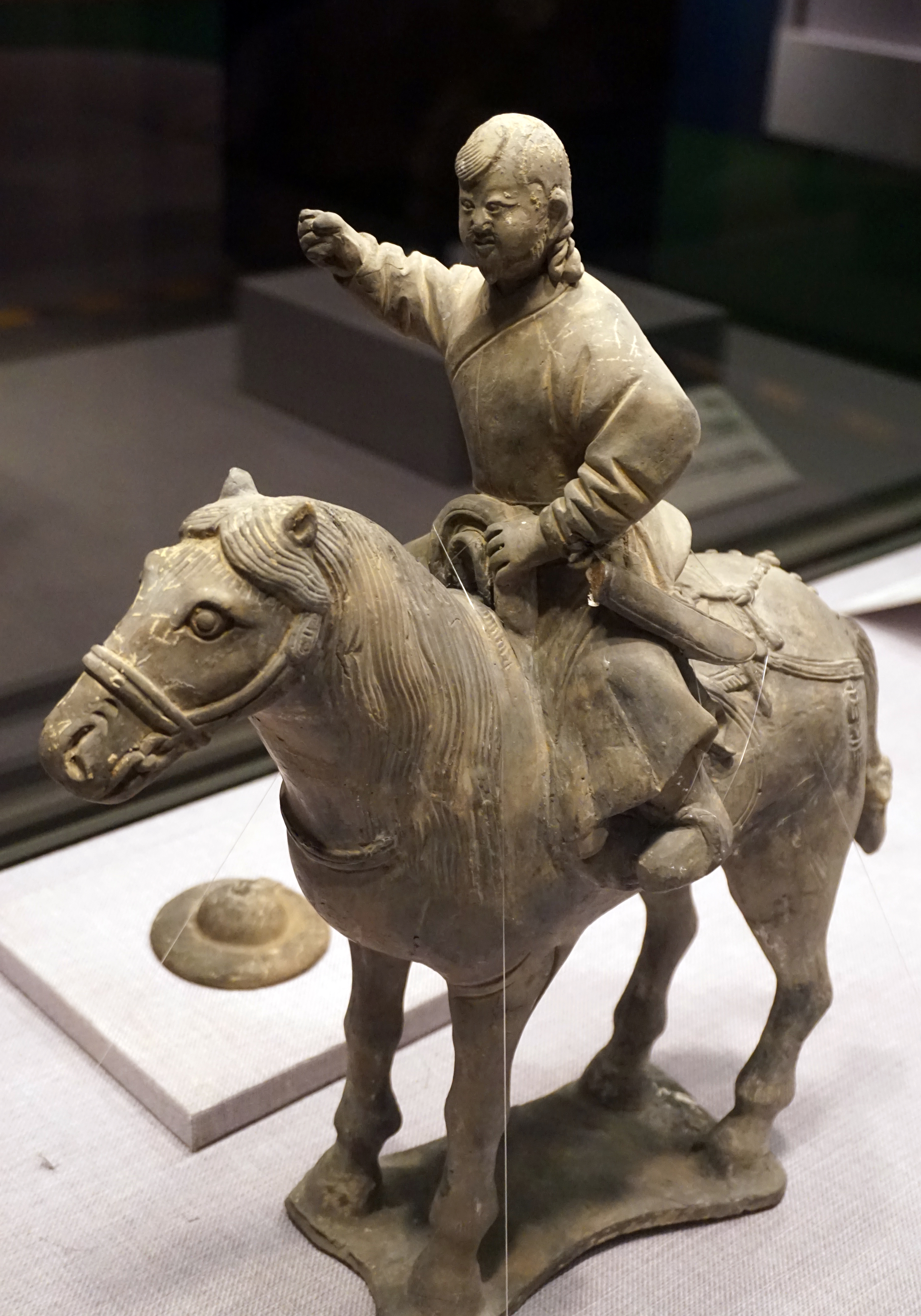
Yuan dynasty Mongol rider

The Donghu are mentioned by Sima Qian as already existing in Inner Mongolia north of Yan in 699–632 BCE along with the Shanrong. Unofficial Chinese sources such as Yi Zhou Shu ("Lost Book of Zhou") and the Classic of Mountains and Seas project the Donghu's activities back to the Shang dynasty (1600–1046 BCE). However, the Hu (胡) were not mentioned among the non-Shang fang (方 "border-region"; modern term fāngguó 方國 "fang-countries") in the extant oracle bones from the Shang period.

The Xianbei formed part of the Donghu confederation, and possibly had in earlier times some independence within the Donghu confederation as well as from the Zhou dynasty. During the Warring States the poem "The Great Summons" (Chinese: 大招; pinyin: Dà zhāo) in the anthology Verses of Chu mentions small-waisted and long-necked Xianbei women, and possibly also the book Discourses of the States, which states that during the reign of King Cheng of Zhou (reigned 1042–1021 BCE) the Xianbei came to participate at a meeting of Zhou subject-lords at Qiyang (岐阳) (now Qishan County) but were only allowed to perform the fire ceremony under the supervision of Chu since they were not vassals (诸侯) by enfeoffment and establishment. The Xianbei chieftain was appointed joint guardian of the ritual torch along with Chu viscount Xiong Yi. (Note: Zhang Zhengming (2017) accepts the reading 鮮卑 (also seen in the early 19th century version published by Jinzhang bookstore (錦章図書局) in Shanghai) as the ethnonym of the people who accompanied the Chu. However, 鮮卑 Xianbei is likely a scribal error for 鮮牟 Xianmou (as in other versions like Sibu Congkan (四部叢刊), or Siku Quanshu (四庫全書)). Eastern Wu scholar Wei Zhao states that the 鮮牟 Xianmou were an Eastern Yi nation, while the 鮮卑 Xianbei were of Mountain Rong origin. The apparent scribal error results in contradicting statements, apparently by Wei Zhao, that the Xianbei were an Eastern Yi nation and a people of Mountain Rong origin. Huang Pilie (1763-1825) states that the reading 鮮卑 Xianbei was inauthentic and identifies the 鮮牟 Xianmou with 根牟 Genmou, an Eastern Yi nation conquered by the Lu state in the 9th year of Duke Xuan of Lu's reign (600 BCE).)

These early Xianbei came from the nearby Zhukaigou culture (2200–1500 BCE) in the Ordos Desert, where maternal DNA corresponds to the Mongol Daur people and the Tungusic Evenks. The Zhukaigou Xianbei (part of the Ordos culture of Inner Mongolia and northern Shaanxi) had trade relations with the Shang. Liu Song dynasty commentator Pei Yin (裴駰), in his Jixie (集解), quoted Eastern Han dynasty scholar Fu Qian (服虔)'s assertion that Shanrong (山戎) and Beidi (北狄) are ancestors of the present-day Xianbei (鮮卑). Again in Inner Mongolia another closely connected core Mongolic Xianbei region was the Upper Xiajiadian culture (1000–600 BCE) where the Donghu confederation was centered.

After the Donghu were defeated by Xiongnu king Modu Chanyu, the Xianbei and Wuhuan survived as the main remnants of the confederation. Tadun Khan of the Wuhuan (died 207 AD) was the ancestor of the proto-Mongolic Kumo Xi. The Wuhuan are of the direct Donghu royal line and the New Book of Tang says that in 209 BCE, Modu Chanyu defeated the Wuhuan instead of using the word Donghu. The Xianbei, however, were of the lateral Donghu line and had a somewhat separate identity, although they shared the same language with the Wuhuan. In 49 CE the Xianbei ruler Bianhe (Bayan Khan?) raided and defeated the Xiongnu, killing 2000, after having received generous gifts from Emperor Guangwu of Han. The Xianbei reached their peak under Tanshihuai (reigned 156–181) who expanded their vast but short lived confederation.

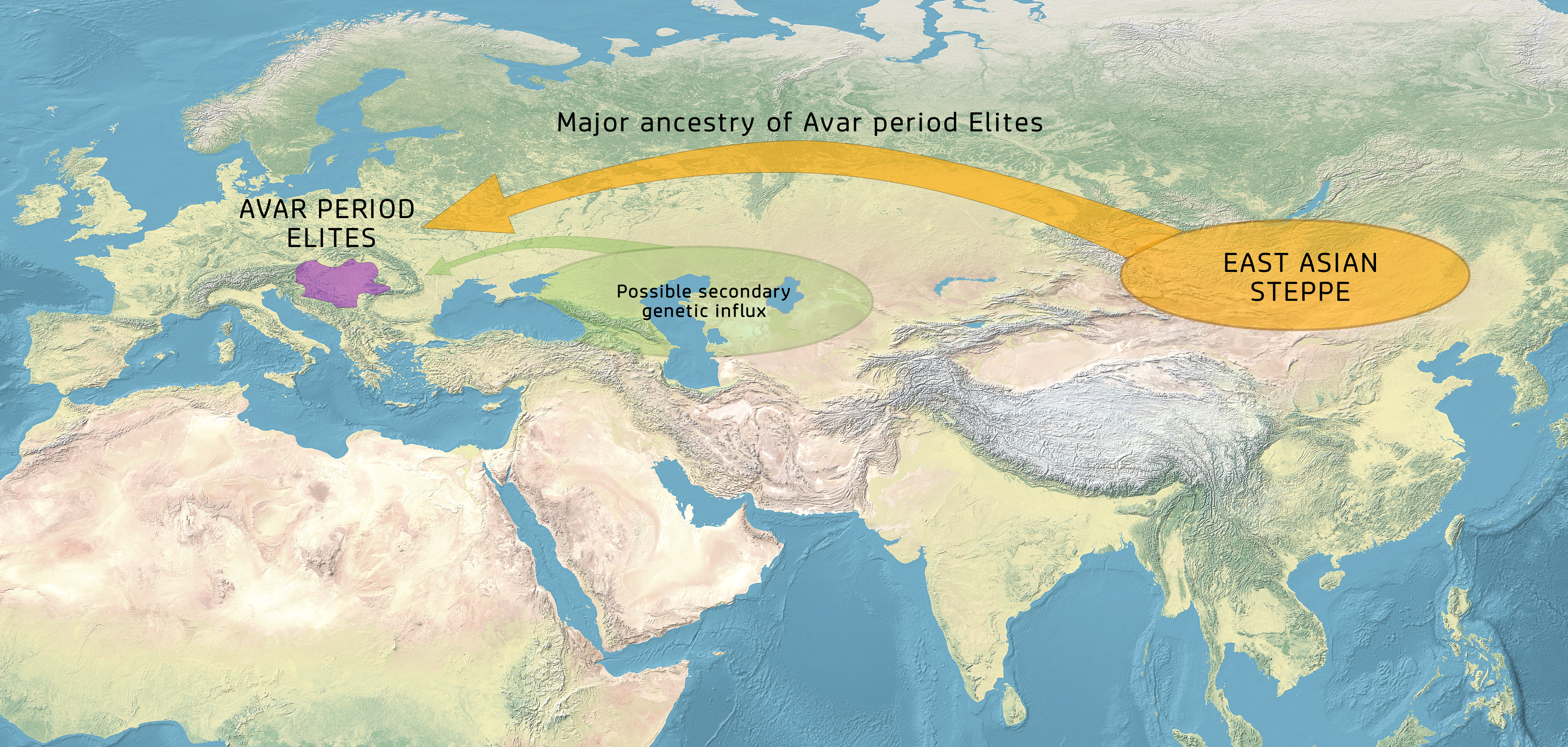
Analysis of DNA extracted from the remains of Avars found in Hungary has provided evidence that they originated in what is now Mongolia.

Three prominent groups split from the Xianbei state as recorded by the Chinese histories: the Rouran (claimed by some to be the Pannonian Avars), the Khitan people and the Shiwei (a subtribe called the "Shiwei Menggu" is held to be the origin of the Genghisid Mongols). Besides these three Xianbei groups, there were others such as the Murong, Duan and Tuoba. Their culture was nomadic, their religion shamanism or Buddhism and their military strength formidable. There is still no direct evidence that the Rouran spoke Mongolic languages, although most scholars agree that they were Proto-Mongolic. The Khitan, however, had two scripts of their own and many Mongolic words are found in their half-deciphered writings.

Geographically, the Tuoba Xianbei ruled the southern part of Inner Mongolia and northern China, the Rouran (Yujiulü Shelun was the first to use the title khagan in 402) ruled eastern Mongolia, western Mongolia, the northern part of Inner Mongolia and northern Mongolia, the Khitan were concentrated in eastern part of Inner Mongolia north of Korea and the Shiwei were located to the north of the Khitan. These tribes and kingdoms were soon overshadowed by the rise of the First Turkic Khaganate in 555, the Uyghur Khaganate in 745 and the Yenisei Kirghiz states in 840. The Tuoba were eventually absorbed into China. The Rouran fled west from the Göktürks and either disappeared into obscurity or, as some say, invaded Europe as the Avars under their Khan, Bayan I. Some Rouran under Tatar Khan migrated east, founding the Tatar confederation, who became part of the Shiwei. The Khitans, who were independent after their separation from the Kumo Xi (of Wuhuan origin) in 388, continued as a minor power in Manchuria until one of them, Abaoji (872–926), established the Liao dynasty (916–1125).

=== Mongol Empire ===
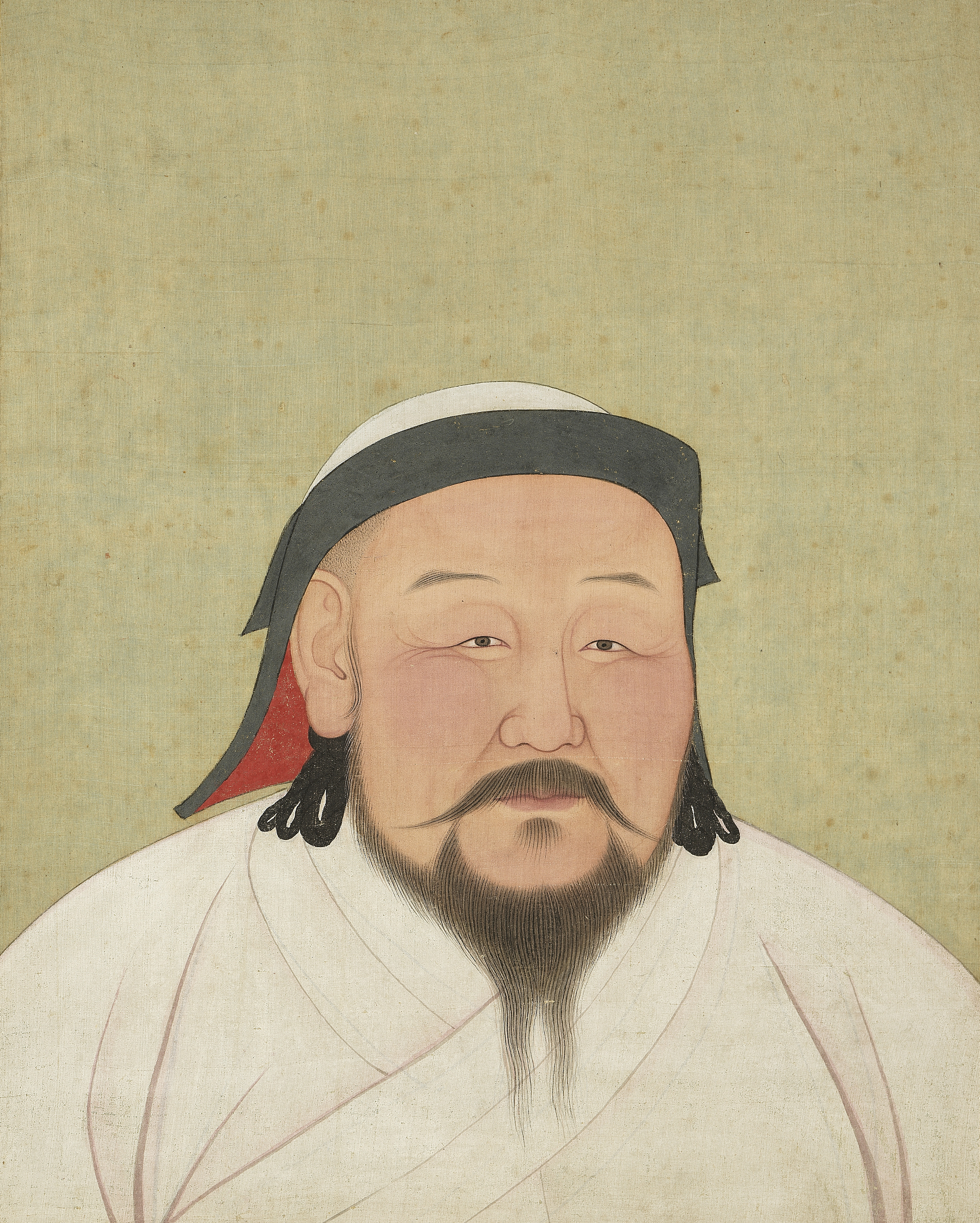
A portrait of Kublai Khan by Araniko (1245–1306)

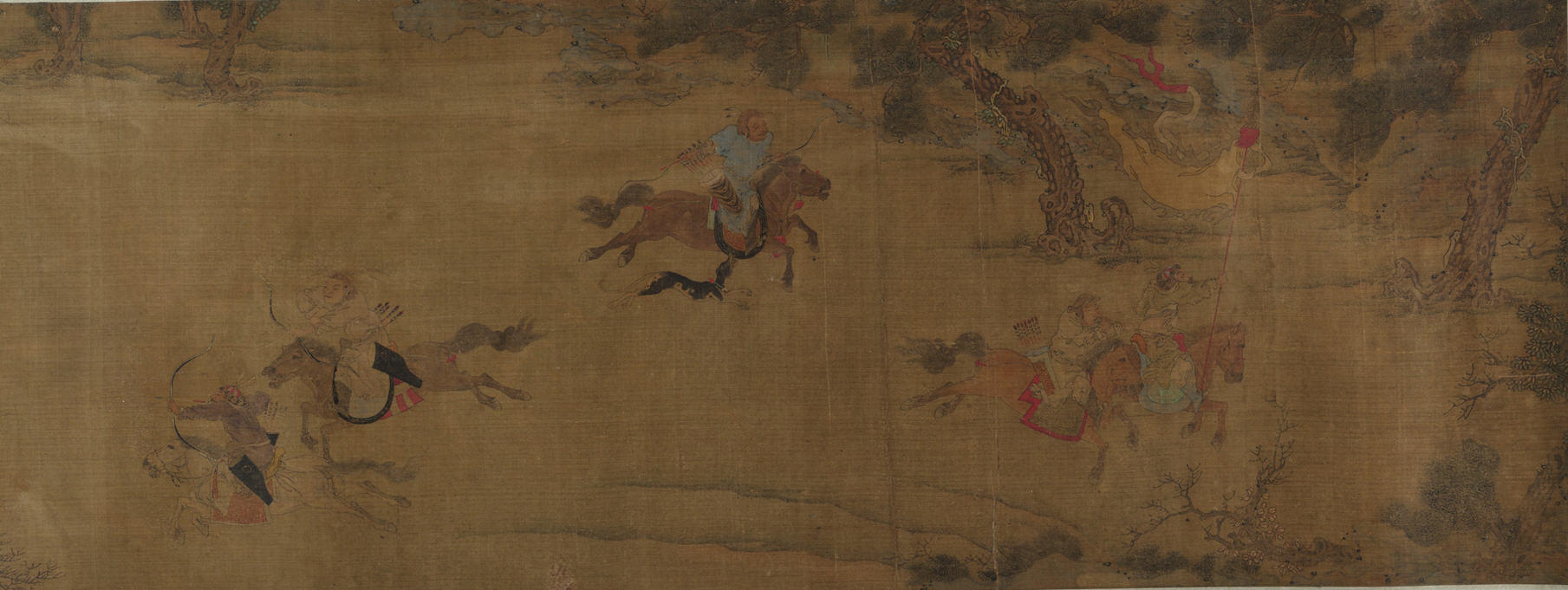
Mongol huntsmen, Ming dynasty

The destruction of the Uyghur Khaganate by the Kirghiz resulted in the end of Turkic dominance in Mongolia. According to historians, Kirghiz were not interested in assimilating newly acquired lands. The Khitans occupied the areas vacated by the Turkic Uyghurs bringing them under their control. The Yenisei Kirghiz state was centered on Khakassia and they were expelled from Mongolia by the Khitans in 924. Beginning in the 10th century, the Khitans, under the leadership of Abaoji, prevailed in several military campaigns against the Tang dynasty's border guards, and the Xi, Shiwei and Jurchen nomadic groups.

Remnants of the Liao dynasty led by Yelü Dashi fled west through Mongolia after being defeated by the Jurchen-led Jin dynasty and founded the Qara Khitai (Western Liao dynasty) in 1124 while still maintaining control over western Mongolia. In 1218, Genghis Khan incorporated the Qara Khitai after which the Khitan passed into obscurity. Some remnants surfaced as the Qutlugh-Khanid dynasty (1222–1306) in Iran and the Dai Khitai in Afghanistan. With the expansion of the Mongol Empire, the Mongolic people settled over almost all Eurasia and carried on military campaigns from the Adriatic Sea to Indonesian Java and from Japan to Palestine. They simultaneously became Padishahs of Persia, Emperors of China, and Great Khans of the Mongols, and one (Al-Adil Kitbugha) became Sultan of Egypt. The Mongolic peoples of the Golden Horde established themselves to govern Russia by 1240. By 1279, they conquered the Song dynasty and brought all of China proper under the control of the Yuan dynasty.

... from Chinggis up high down to the common people, all are shaven in the style pojiao. As with small boys in China, they leave three locks, one hanging from the crown of their heads. When it has grown some, they clip it; the strands lower on both sides they plait to hang down on the shoulders.

— Zhao Gong

With the breakup of the empire, the dispersed Mongolic peoples quickly adopted the mostly Turkic cultures surrounding them and were assimilated, forming parts of Afghanistan's Hazaras, Azerbaijanis, Uzbeks, Karakalpaks, Tatars, Bashkirs, Turkmens, Uyghurs, Nogais, Kyrgyzs, Kazakhs, Caucasus peoples, Iranian peoples, and Moghuls; linguistic and cultural Persianization also began to be prominent in these territories.

The Oirats, a Mongolic-speaking people who at the time inhabited the forests of northwestern Mongolia, were not yet considered as a Mongol group in contemporary sources such as the Secret History of the Mongols or the Jami' al-tawarikh. According to Joo-Yup Lee, the Oirats had a non-Mongol origin and had maintained a separate identity until the time of the Dzungar Khanate.

After the collapse of the Mongol Empire, political and ethno-political groups emerged in the Golden Horde and the Chagatai Khanate as successors to the Mongols of the 13th century. These included the Chaghatays (Moghuls and Timurids), Uzbeks, Qazaqs, Manghits, and Tatars, among others, collectively known as "Turkified Mongols". These Turkic-speaking nomads generally referred to the Northern Yuan Mongols as Qalmaqs. The term could denote both Turkic- and Mongolic-speaking groups, including the Oirats and the Northern Yuan Mongols. In the Zafarnama Yazdi, a historical work on Turko-Mongol conqueror Timur, the Mongols who lived in the territory of modern-day Mongolia at the turn of the 15th century are referred to as "Qalmaqs". Court chroniclers described the Qalmaqs as Uzbeks or Tatars who had not converted to Islam.

=== Northern Yuan ===
The Northern Yuan dynasty and Turco-Mongol residual states and domains by the 15th century

Ming dynasty and the Northern Yuan in the early 15th century.

After the fall of the Yuan dynasty in 1368, the Mongols continued to rule the Northern Yuan in northern China and the Mongolian steppe. However, the Oirats began to challenge the Eastern Mongols under the Borjigin monarchs in the late 14th century and Mongolia was divided into two parts: Western Mongolia (Oirats) and Eastern Mongolia (Khalkha, Inner Mongols, Barga, Buryats). The earliest written references to the plough in Middle Mongol language sources appear towards the end of the 14th c.

In 1434, Eastern Mongol Taisun Khan's (1433–1452) Oirat prime minister Togoon Taish reunited the Mongols after killing Adai Khan in Ejin. Togoon died in 1439 and his son Esen Taish became ruler of Northern Yuan dynasty. Esen later unified the Mongol tribes. The Ming dynasty attempted to invade the Northern Yuan in the 14th to 16th centuries. However, the Ming dynasty was defeated by the Oirat, Southern Mongol, Eastern Mongol, and united Mongol armies. Esen's 30,000 cavalries defeated 500,000 Chinese soldiers in the 1449 Tumu Crisis. Within eighteen months of his defeat of the titular Khan Taisun, in 1453, Esen himself took the title of Great Khan (1454–1455) of the Great Yuan.

The Khalkha emerged during the reign of Dayan Khan (1479–1543) as one of the six tumens of the Eastern Mongolic peoples. They quickly became the dominant Mongolic clan in Mongolia proper. He reunited the Mongols again. In 1550, Altan Khan led a Tumed Mongol raid on Beijing. The Mongols voluntarily reunified during Eastern Mongolian Tümen Zasagt Khan rule (1558–1592) for the last time (the Mongol Empire united all Mongols before this).

Eastern Mongolia was divided into three parts in the 17th century: Outer Mongolia (Khalkha), Inner Mongolia (Inner Mongols), and the Buryat region in southern Siberia.

The last Mongol khagan was Ligdan in the early 17th century. He got into conflicts with the Manchus over the looting of Chinese cities, and managed to alienate most Mongol tribes. In 1618, Ligdan signed a treaty with the Ming dynasty to protect their northern border from the Manchus attack in exchange for thousands of taels of silver. By the 1620s, only the Chahars remained under his rule.

It is noteworthy that during this period the Mongols perceived the Oirats, who are commonly referred to in modern scholarship as the "Western Mongols," as a distinct community. The Northern Yuan Mongols appear to have regarded their Turkicized Chinggisid neighbors as kindred peoples. Thus, according to the Erdeni-yin tobči, a Chinggisid prince and his Naiman retainer, fleeing from the Oirat ruler Esen Taishi, sought refuge in the Ulus of Jochi, which the Mongols at the time called Toγmaγ, saying: "The khans of Toγmaγ, the descendants of Jochi, are our kindred (töröl)." Furthermore, as noted above, the Erdeni tunumal neretü sudur relates that Altan Khan's envoys, seeking to appease the Moghuls, reminded them of their descent from Chinggis Khan. This suggests that Altan Khan likewise regarded the rulers of Moghulistan as his kin. Oirat authors, in turn, generally portrayed both the Northern Yuan Mongols and the Oirats as distinct communities. The Northern Yuan Mongols viewed the Oirats as foreign enemies (qari daisun).

In 1688, the Oirats invaded Khalkha, looting and burning monasteries. Under the leadership of Galdan Boshugtu Khan, the Dzungar Khanate had by this time emerged as a major political power in Inner Asia. The invasion ultimately had catastrophic consequences for the Khalkha, as it compelled the Mongols of the Northern Yuan to seek protection and support from the Qing dynasty. On 30 May 1691, the Mongol princes formally submitted to the Qing emperor at the Dolon Nor assembly.

=== Qing era ===
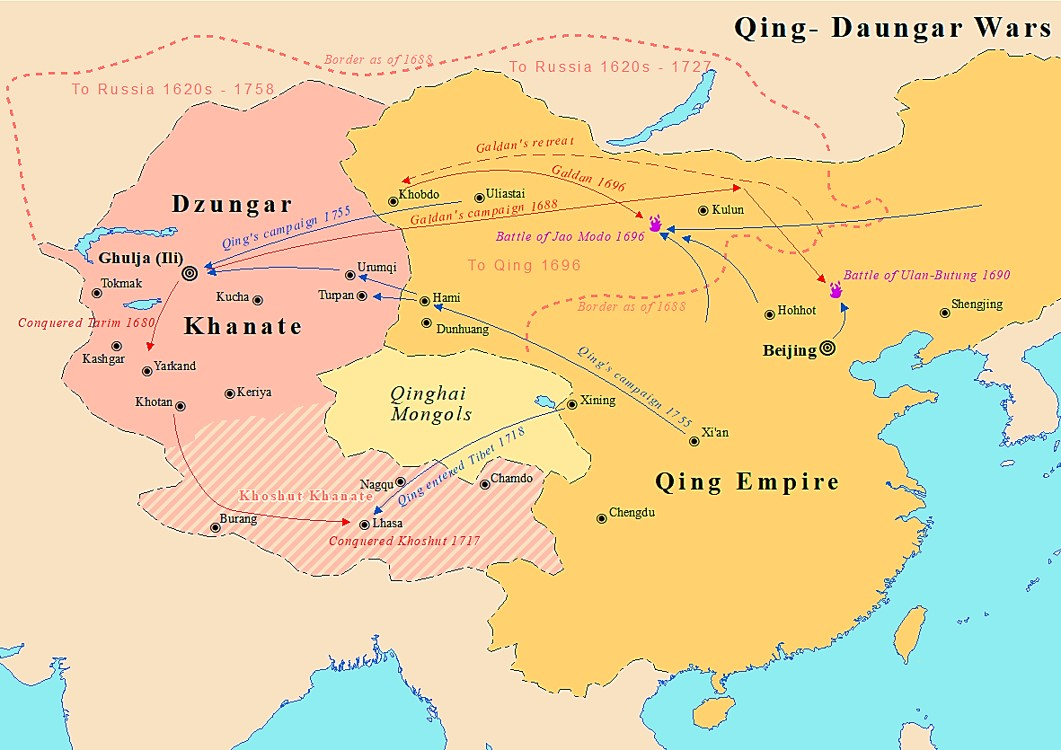
Map showing wars between Qing dynasty and Dzungar Khanate

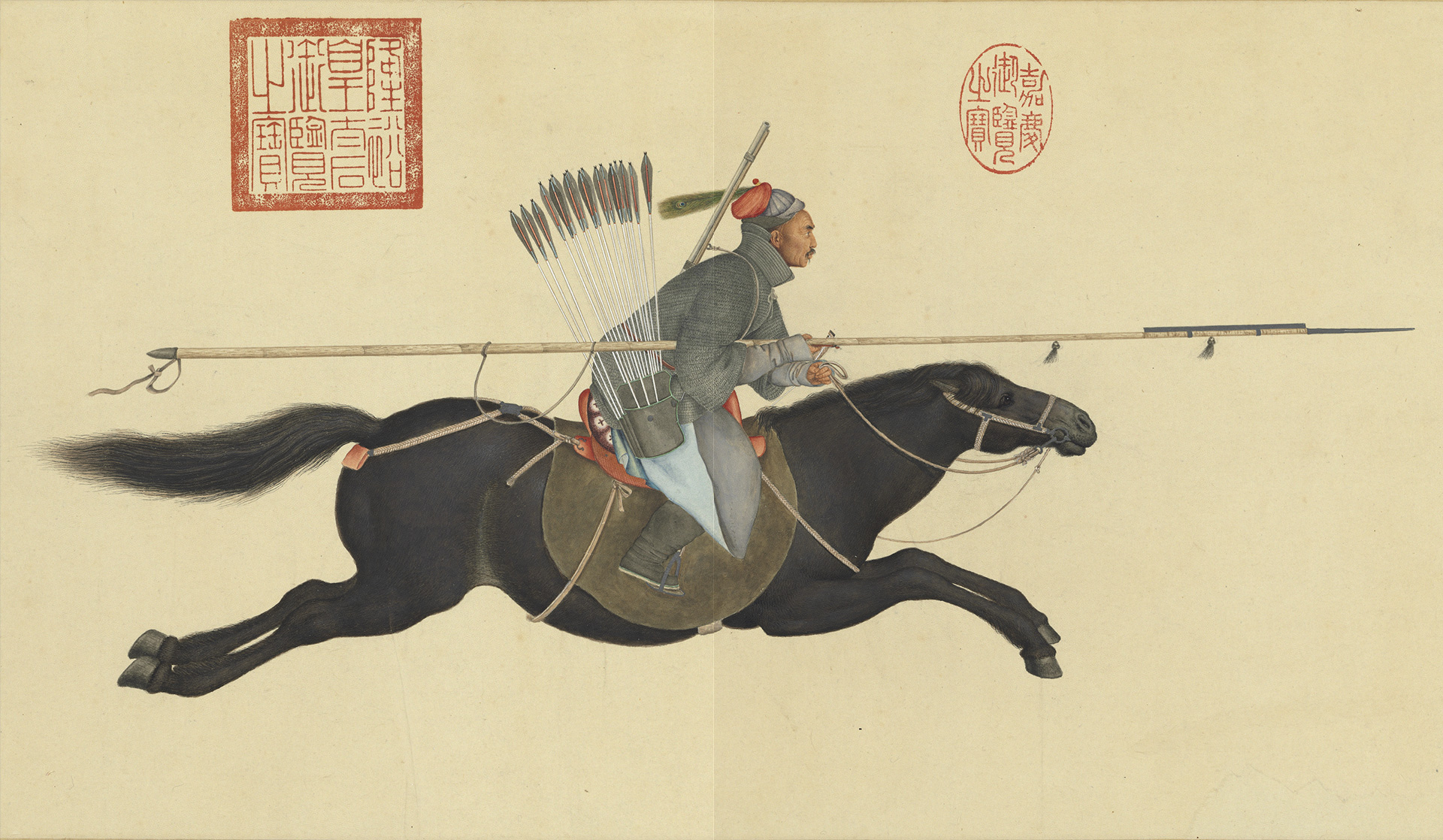
A Dzungar soldier called Ayusi from the high Qing era, by Giuseppe Castiglione, 1755, collection of Ziguangge

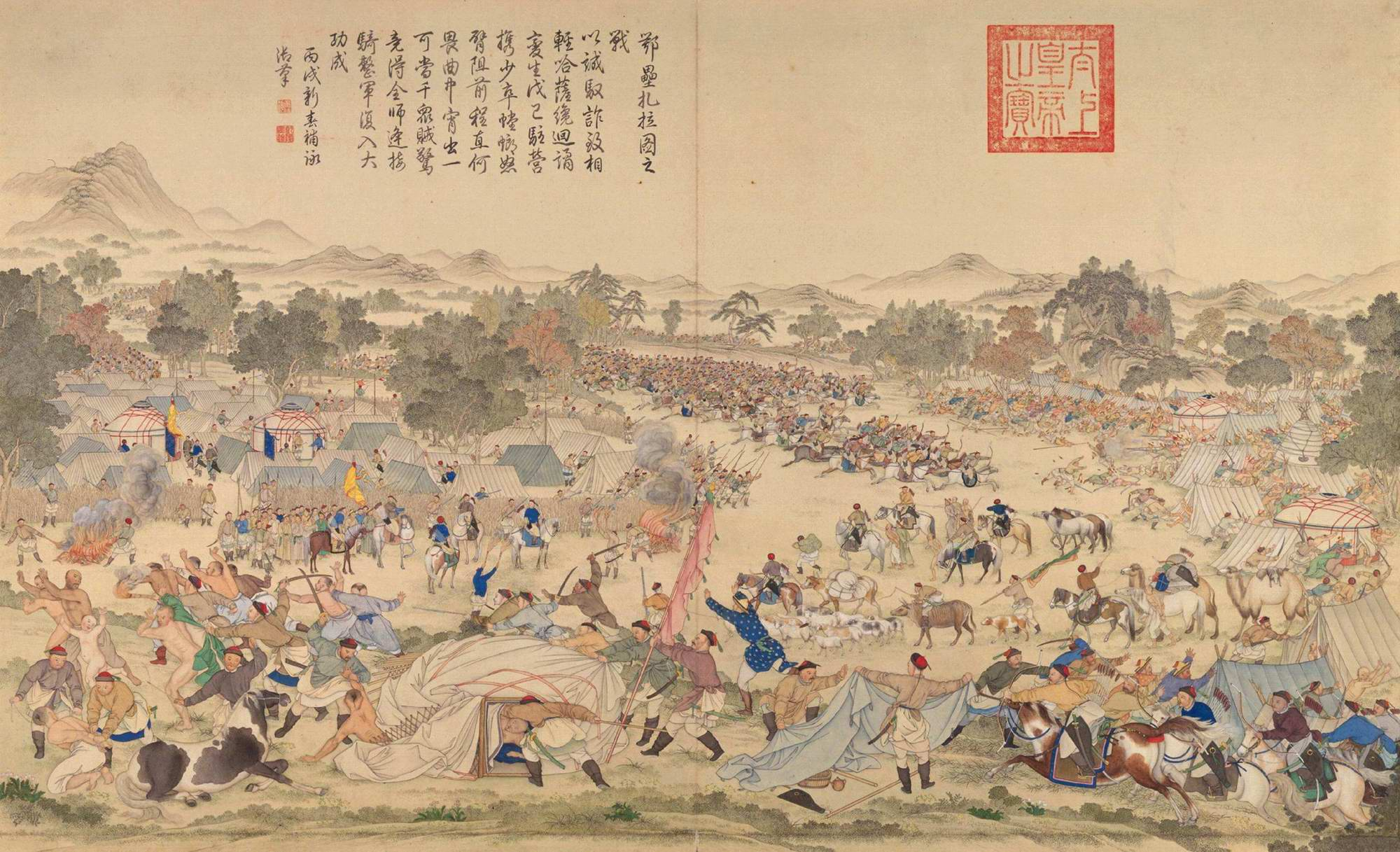
The Battle of Oroi-Jalatu in 1755 between the Qing (that ruled China at the time) and Mongol Dzungar armies. The fall of the Dzungar Khanate

The Chahar army was defeated in 1625 and 1628 by the Inner Mongol and Manchu armies due to Ligdan's faulty tactics. The Qing forces secured their control over Inner Mongolia by 1635, and the army of the last khan Ligdan moved to battle against Tibetan Gelugpa sect (Yellow Hat sect) forces. The Gelugpa forces supported the Manchus, while Ligdan supported Kagyu sect (Red Hat sect) of Tibetan Buddhism. Ligden died in 1634 on his way to Tibet. By 1636, most Inner Mongolian nobles had submitted to the Qing dynasty founded by the Manchus. Inner Mongolian Tengis noyan revolted against the Qing in the 1640s and the Khalkha battled to protect Sunud.

Western Mongol Oirats and Eastern Mongolian Khalkhas vied for domination in Mongolia since the 15th century and this conflict weakened Mongol strength. In 1688, the Western Mongol Dzungar Khanate's king Galdan Boshugtu attacked Khalkha after murder of his younger brother by Tusheet Khan Chakhundorj (main or Central Khalkha leader) and the Khalkha-Oirat War began. Galdan threatened to kill Chakhundorj and Zanabazar (Javzandamba Khutagt I, spiritual head of Khalkha) but they escaped to Sunud (Inner Mongolia). Many Khalkha nobles and commoners fled to Inner Mongolia because of the war. Some Khalkhas fled to the Buryat region and Russia threatened to exterminate them if they did not submit, but many of them instead submitted to Galdan Boshugtu.

In 1683, Galdan's armies reached Tashkent and the Syr Darya and crushed two armies of the Kazakhs. After that Galdan subjugated the Black Khirgizs and ravaged the Fergana Valley. From 1685 Galdan's forces aggressively pushed the Kazakhs. While his general Rabtan took Taraz, and his main force forced the Kazakhs to migrate westwards. In 1687, he besieged the City of Turkistan. Under the leadership of Abul Khair Khan, the Kazakhs won major victories over the Dzungars at the Bulanty River in 1726, and at the Battle of Anrakay in 1729.

The Khalkha eventually submitted to Qing rule in 1691 by Zanabazar's decision, thus bringing all of today's Mongolia under the rule of the Qing dynasty, although Khalkha de facto remained under the rule of Galdan Boshugtu Khaan until 1696. The Mongol-Oirat's Code (a treaty of alliance) against foreign invasion between the Oirats and Khalkhas was signed in 1640. However, the Mongols could not unite against foreign invasions. Chakhundorj fought against Russian invasion of Outer Mongolia until 1688 and stopped Russian invasion of Khövsgöl. Zanabazar struggled to bring together the Oirats and Khalkhas before the war.

Galdan Boshugtu sent his army to "liberate" Inner Mongolia after defeating the Khalkha's army and called Inner Mongolian nobles to fight for Mongolian independence. Some Inner Mongolian nobles, Tibetans, the Kumul Khanate, and some Moghulistan nobles supported his war against the Manchus, however, most Inner Mongolian nobles did not battle against the Qing.

There were three khans in Khalkha and Zasagt Khan (Western Khalkha leader) was Galdan's ally. Setsen Khan (Eastern Khalkha leader) did not engage in this conflict. While Galdan was fighting in Eastern Mongolia, his nephew Tsewang Rabtan seized the Dzungarian throne in 1689 and this event made it impossible for Galdan to fight against the Qing Empire. The Russian and Qing Empires supported his action because this coup weakened Western Mongolian strength. Galdan Boshugtu's army was defeated by the outnumbering Qing army in 1696 and he died in 1697. The Mongols who fled to the Buryat region and Inner Mongolia returned after the war. Some Khalkhas mixed with the Buryats.

The Buryats fought against Russian invasion since the 1620s and thousands of Buryats were massacred. The Buryat region was formally annexed to Russia by treaties in 1689 and 1727, when the territories on both the sides of Lake Baikal were separated from Mongolia. In 1689, the Treaty of Nerchinsk established the northern border of Manchuria north of the present line. The Russians retained the Trans-Baikal region between Lake Baikal and the Argun River north of Mongolia. The Treaty of Kyakhta, along with the Treaty of Nerchinsk, regulated the relations between Russian and Qing empires until the mid-nineteenth century, and established the Mongolia-Russia border. Oka Buryats revolted in 1767 and Russia completely conquered the Buryat region in the late 18th century.

The Qing Empire conquered the Khoshut Khanate of the Upper Mongols in the 1720s. The Dzungar Khanate was conquered by the Qing dynasty in 1755–1758 because of their leaders and military commanders conflicts. Some scholars estimate that about 80% of the Dzungar population were destroyed by a combination of warfare and disease during the Qing conquest of the Dzungar Khanate in 1755–1758. Mark Levene, a historian whose recent research interests focus on genocide, has stated that the extermination of the Dzungars was "arguably the eighteenth century genocide par excellence." The Dzungar population reached 600,000 in 1755.

In the early 20th century, the late Qing government encouraged Han Chinese settlement of Mongolian lands under the name of "New Policies" or "New Administration" (xinzheng). As a result, some Mongol leaders, especially those of Outer Mongolia, decided to seek Mongolian independence. After the Xinhai Revolution, the Mongolian Revolution on 30 November 1911 in Outer Mongolia ended an over 200-year rule of the Qing dynasty.

=== Kalmyks ===
About 200,000–250,000 Oirats migrated from western Mongolia to Volga River in 1607 and established the Kalmyk Khanate. The Torghuts were led by their Tayishi, Kho Orluk. Russia was concerned about an attack but the Kalmyks became a Russian ally and a treaty to protect the southern Russian border was signed between the Kalmyk Khanate and Russia. In 1724 the Kalmyks came under control of Russia. The Tsardom of Russia gradually chipped away at the autonomy of the Kalmyk Khanate. These policies, for instance, encouraged the establishment of Russian and German settlements on pastures the Kalmyks used to roam and feed their livestock. In addition, the Tsarist government imposed a council on the Kalmyk Khan, thereby diluting his authority, while continuing to expect the Kalmyk Khan to provide cavalry units to fight on behalf of Russia. The Russian Orthodox church, by contrast, pressured Buddhist Kalmyks to adopt Orthodoxy. In January 1771, approximately 200,000 (170,000) Kalmyks began the migration from their pastures on the left bank of the Volga to Dzungaria, through the territories of their Bashkir and Kazakh enemies. Ubashi Khan sent his 30,000 cavalries to the Russo-Turkish War to gain weapon before the migration. Empress Catherine the Great ordered the Russian army, Bashkirs and Kazakhs to exterminate all migrants and the Empress abolished the Kalmyk Khanate. The Kyrgyzs attacked them near Lake Balkhash. About 100,000–150,000 Kalmyks who settled on the west bank of the Volga River could not cross the river because the river did not freeze in the winter of 1771 and Catherine the Great executed influential nobles of them. After seven months of travel, only one-third (66,073) of the original group reached Dzungaria (Lake Balkhash, western border of the Qing Empire). The Qing Empire transmigrated the Kalmyks to five different areas to prevent their revolt.

Descendants of the Torghuts and Khoshuts who fled from Kalmykia form the majority of the modern Mongol population in Xinjiang. They formed an important military reserve for the Qing, joining the Qing armies in defeating the Dungan Revolt.

=== Post-Qing era ===
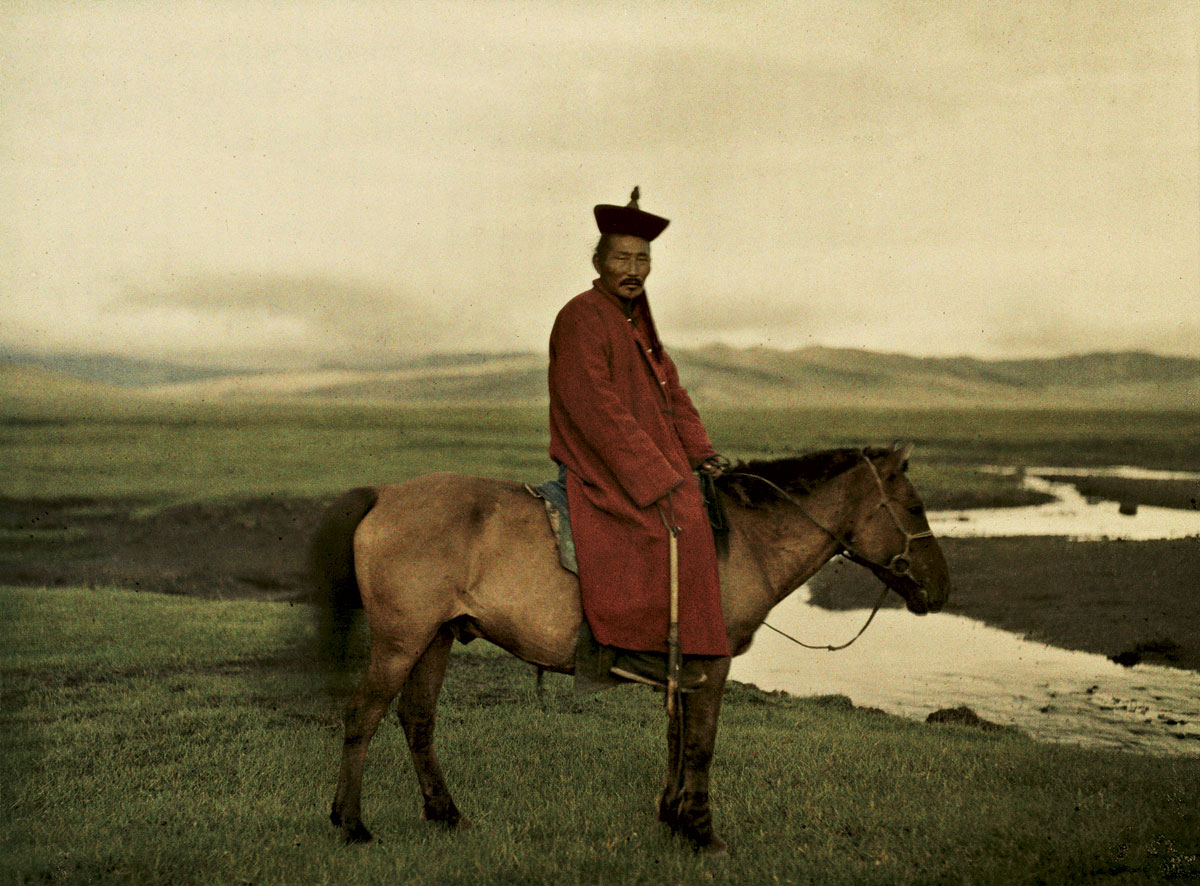
A Mongolian Buddhist noble in Urga, 1913

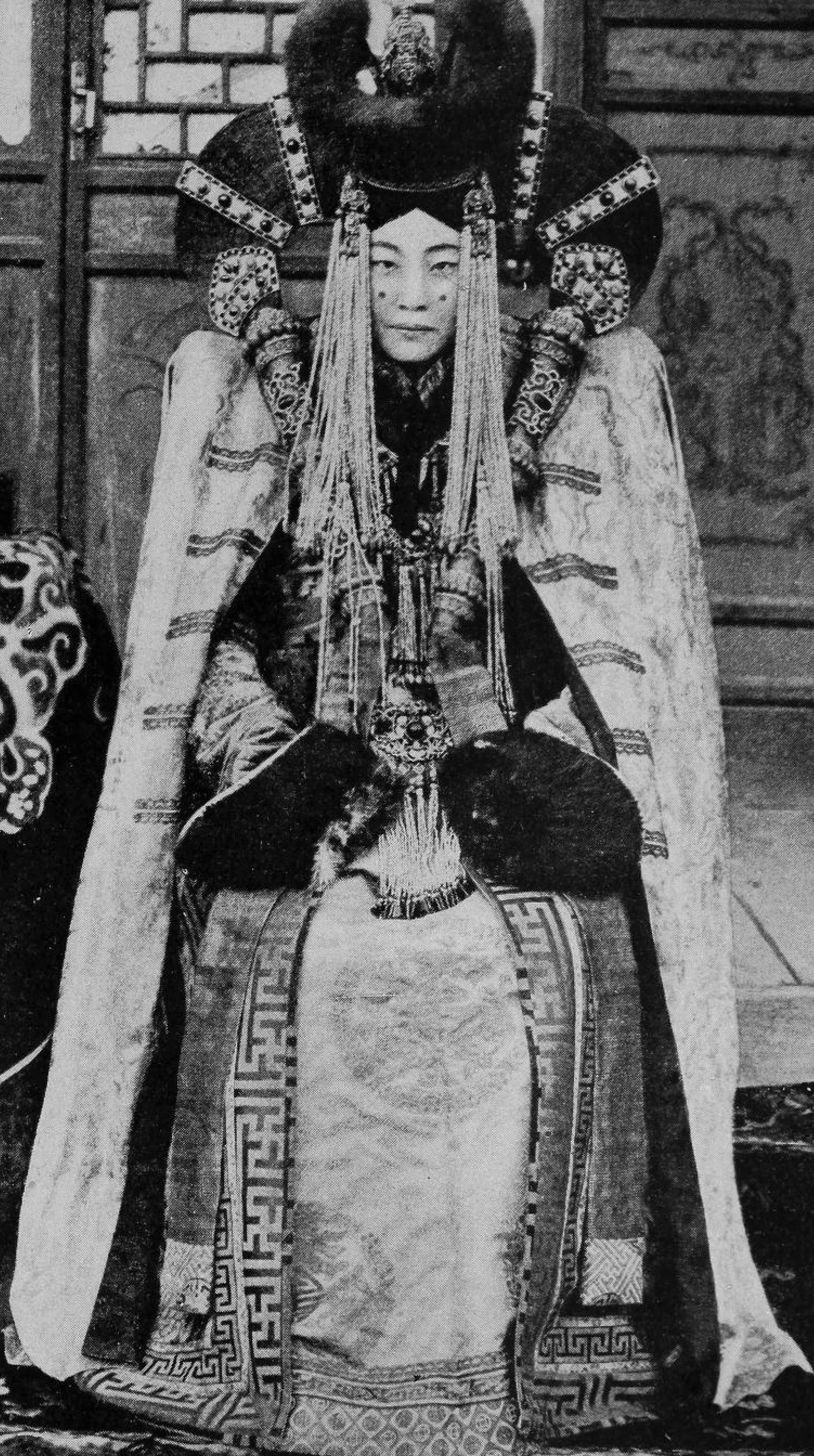
A Mongol woman seated for a portrait, 1921

With the independence of Outer Mongolia, the Mongolian army controlled Khalkha and Khovd regions (modern day Uvs, Khovd, and Bayan-Ölgii Provinces), but Northern Xinjiang (the Altai and Ili regions of the Qing empire), Upper Mongolia, Barga and Inner Mongolia came under control of the newly formed Republic of China. On 2 February 1913, the Bogd Khanate of Mongolia sent Mongolian cavalries to "liberate" Inner Mongolia from China. Russia refused to sell weapons to the Bogd Khanate, and the Russian czar, Nicholas II, referred to it as "Mongolian imperialism". Additionally, the United Kingdom urged Russia to abolish Mongolian independence as it was concerned that "if Mongolians gain independence, then Central Asians will revolt". 10,000 Khalkha and Inner Mongolian cavalries (about 3,500 Inner Mongols) defeated 70,000 Chinese soldiers and controlled almost all of Inner Mongolia; however, the Mongolian army retreated due to lack of weapons in 1914. 400 Mongol soldiers and 3,795 Chinese soldiers died in this war. The Khalkhas, Khovd Oirats, Buryats, Dzungarian Oirats, Upper Mongols, Barga Mongols, most Inner Mongolian and some Tuvan leaders sent statements to support Bogd Khan's call of Mongolian reunification. In reality however, most of them were too prudent or irresolute to attempt joining the Bogd Khan regime. Russia encouraged Mongolia to become an autonomous region of China in 1914. Mongolia lost Barga, Dzungaria, Tuva, Upper Mongolia and Inner Mongolia in the 1915 Treaty of Kyakhta.

In October 1919, the Republic of China occupied Mongolia after the suspicious deaths of Mongolian patriotic nobles. On 3 February 1921, the White Russian army—led by Baron Ungern and mainly consisting of Mongolian volunteer cavalries, and Buryat and Tatar Cossacks—took Urga. Baron Ungern's purpose was to find allies to defeat the Soviet Union. The Statement of Reunification of Mongolia was adopted by Mongolian revolutionaries in 1921. The Soviets, however, considered Mongolia to be Chinese territory in 1924 during a secret meeting with the Republic of China. Although the Soviet Union supported the Mongolian People's Republic, Soviets carried out various policies (political, economic, and cultural) against Mongolia until its fall in 1991 to prevent pan-Mongolism and other irredentist movements.

On 10 April 1932, Mongolians revolted against the government's new policy and Soviets. The government and Soviet soldiers defeated the rebels in October.

The Buryats started to migrate to Mongolia in the 1900s due to Russian oppression. Joseph Stalin's regime stopped the migration in 1930 and started a campaign of ethnic cleansing against newcomers and Mongolians. During the Stalinist repressions in Mongolia, almost all adult Buryat men and 22,000–33,000 Mongols (3–5% of the total population; common citizens, monks, pan-Mongolists, nationalists, patriots, hundreds of military officers, nobles, intellectuals, and elite people) were shot dead under Soviet orders. Some authors also offer much higher estimates, up to 100,000 victims, out of an overall population of about 700,000 to 900,000 people. The proportion of victims in relation to the population of the country is much higher than the corresponding figures of the Great Purge in the Soviet Union.

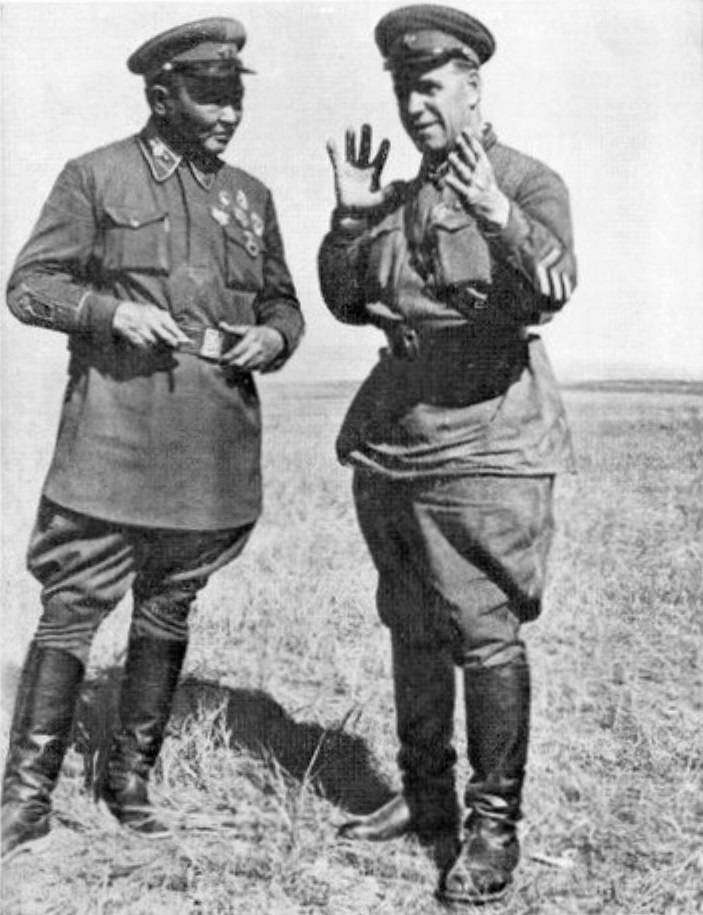
Khorloogiin Choibalsan, leader of the Mongolian People's Republic (left), and Georgy Zhukov consult during the Battle of Khalkhin Gol against Japanese troops, 1939

The Manchukuo (1932–1945), puppet state of the Empire of Japan (1868–1947) invaded Barga and some part of Inner Mongolia with Japanese help. The Mongolian army advanced to the Great Wall of China during the Soviet–Japanese War of 1945 (Mongolian name: Liberation War of 1945). Japan forced Inner Mongolian and Barga people to fight against Mongolians but they surrendered to Mongolians and started to fight against their Japanese and Manchu allies. Marshal Khorloogiin Choibalsan called Inner Mongolians and Xinjiang Oirats to migrate to Mongolia during the war but the Soviet Army blocked Inner Mongolian migrants' way. It was a part of a Pan-Mongolian plan and few Oirats and Inner Mongols (Huuchids, Bargas, Tümeds, about 800 Uzemchins) arrived. Inner Mongolian leaders carried out active policy to merge Inner Mongolia with Mongolia since 1911. They founded the Inner Mongolian Army in 1929 but the Inner Mongolian Army disbanded after ending World War II. The Japanese Empire supported Pan-Mongolism since the 1910s but there have never been active relations between Mongolia and Imperial Japan due to Russian resistance. The nominally independent Inner Mongolian Mengjiang state (1936–1945) was established with support of Japan in 1936; also, some Buryat and Inner Mongol nobles founded a pan-Mongolist government with the support of Japan in 1919.

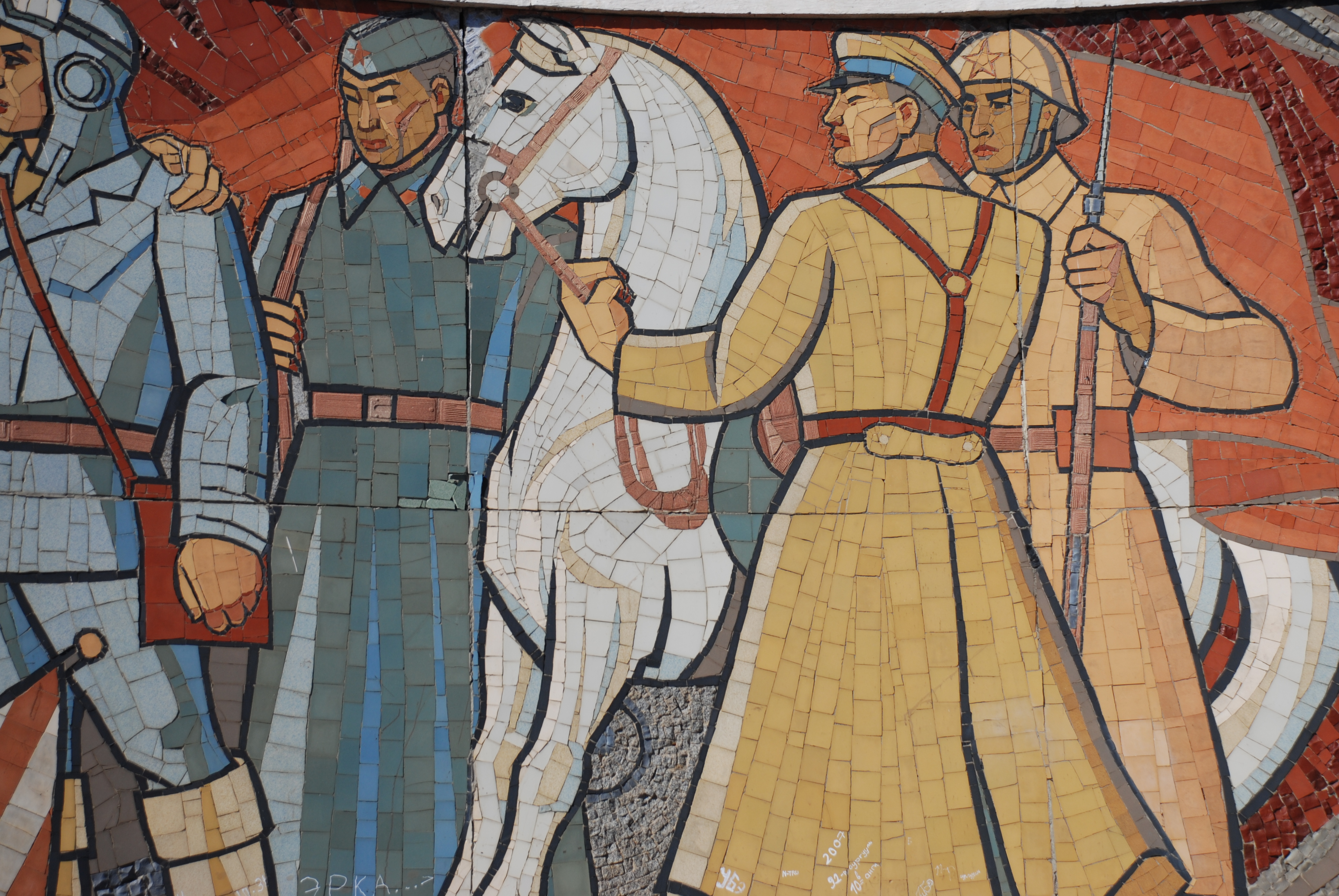
World War II Zaisan Memorial, Ulaanbaatar, from the Mongolian People's Republic era.

The National Government of the Republic of China officially recognized Mongolian independence in 1945. The Inner Mongols established the short-lived Inner Mongolian People's Republic in 1945, before its integration into the Chinese Communist Party-led zones.

35,000 Buryats were killed during a rebellion in 1927, and around one-third of the Buryat population in Russia died in the 1900s–1950s. 10,000 Buryats of the Buryat-Mongol Autonomous Soviet Socialist Republic were massacred by Stalin's order in the 1930s. In 1919, the Buryats established a small theocratic Balagad state in the Kizhinginsky District of Russia which later fell in 1926. In 1958, the name "Mongol" was removed from the name of the Buryat-Mongol Autonomous Soviet Socialist Republic.

On 22 January 1922, Mongolia proposed to relocate the Kalmyks during the Kalmyk Famine, but Bolshevik Russia refused. 71,000–72,000 (93,000?; around half of the population) Kalmyks died during the Russian famine of 1921–22. Stalin deported all Kalmyks to Siberia in 1943 and around half of the (97,000–98,000) Kalmyks deported to Siberia died before being allowed to return home in 1957. The government of the Soviet Union forbade teaching the Kalmyk language during the deportation. The Kalmyks' main purpose was to migrate to Mongolia and many Kalmyks joined the German Army. Marshal Khorloogiin Choibalsan attempted to migrate the deportees to Mongolia and he met with them in Siberia during his visit to Russia. Under the Law of the Russian Federation of April 26, 1991 "On Rehabilitation of Exiled Peoples," repressions against Kalmyks and other peoples were qualified as acts of genocide.

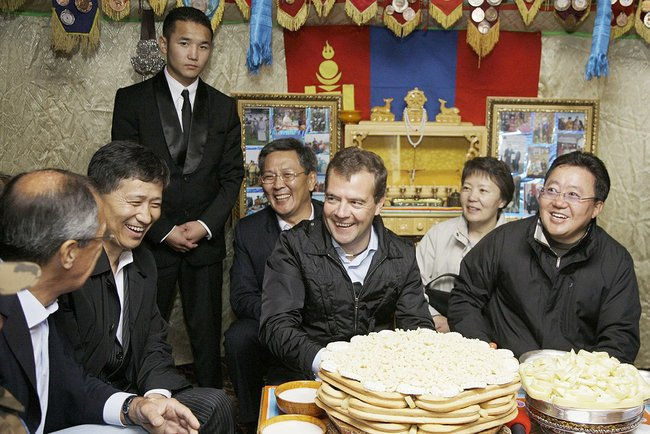
Mongolian President Tsakhiagiin Elbegdorj (right)

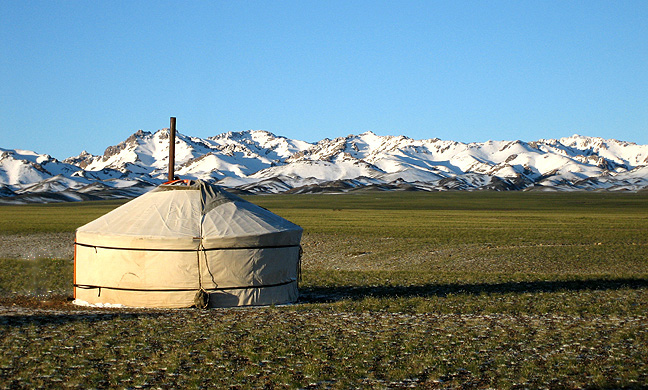
A Mongolic Ger

Agin-Buryat Okrug and Ust-Orda Buryat Okrugs merged with Irkutsk Oblast and Chita Oblast in 2008 despite Buryats' resistance. Small scale protests occurred in Inner Mongolia in 2011. The Inner Mongolian People's Party is a member of the Unrepresented Nations and Peoples Organization and its leaders are attempting to establish a sovereign state or merge Inner Mongolia with Mongolia.

== Language ==
Chronological tree of the Mongolic languages

Mongolian is the official national language of Mongolia, where it is spoken by nearly 2.8 million people (2010 estimate), and the official provincial language of China's Inner Mongolia Autonomous Region, where there are at least 4.1 million ethnic Mongols. Across the whole of China, the language is spoken by roughly half of the country's 5.8 million ethnic Mongols (2005 estimate) However, the exact number of Mongolian speakers in China is unknown, as there is no data available on the language proficiency of that country's citizens. The use of Mongolian in China, specifically in Inner Mongolia, has witnessed periods of decline and revival over the last few hundred years. The language experienced a decline during the late Qing period, a revival between 1947 and 1965, a second decline between 1966 and 1976, a second revival between 1977 and 1992, and a third decline between 1995 and 2012. However, in spite of the decline of the Mongolian language in some of Inner Mongolia's urban areas and educational spheres, the ethnic identity of the urbanized Chinese-speaking Mongols is most likely going to survive due to the presence of urban ethnic communities. The multilingual situation in Inner Mongolia does not appear to obstruct efforts by ethnic Mongols to preserve their language. Although an unknown number of Mongols in China, such as the Tumets, may have completely or partially lost the ability to speak their language, they are still registered as ethnic Mongols and continue to identify themselves as ethnic Mongols. The children of inter-ethnic Mongol-Chinese marriages also claim to be and are registered as ethnic Mongols.

The specific origin of the Mongolic languages and associated tribes is unclear. Linguists have traditionally proposed a link to the Tungusic and Turkic language families, included alongside Mongolic in the broader group of Altaic languages, though this remains controversial. Today the Mongolian peoples speak at least one of several Mongolic languages including Mongolian, Buryat, Oirat, Dongxiang, Tu and Bonan. Additionally, many Mongols speak either Russian or Mandarin Chinese as languages of inter-ethnic communication.

== Religion ==
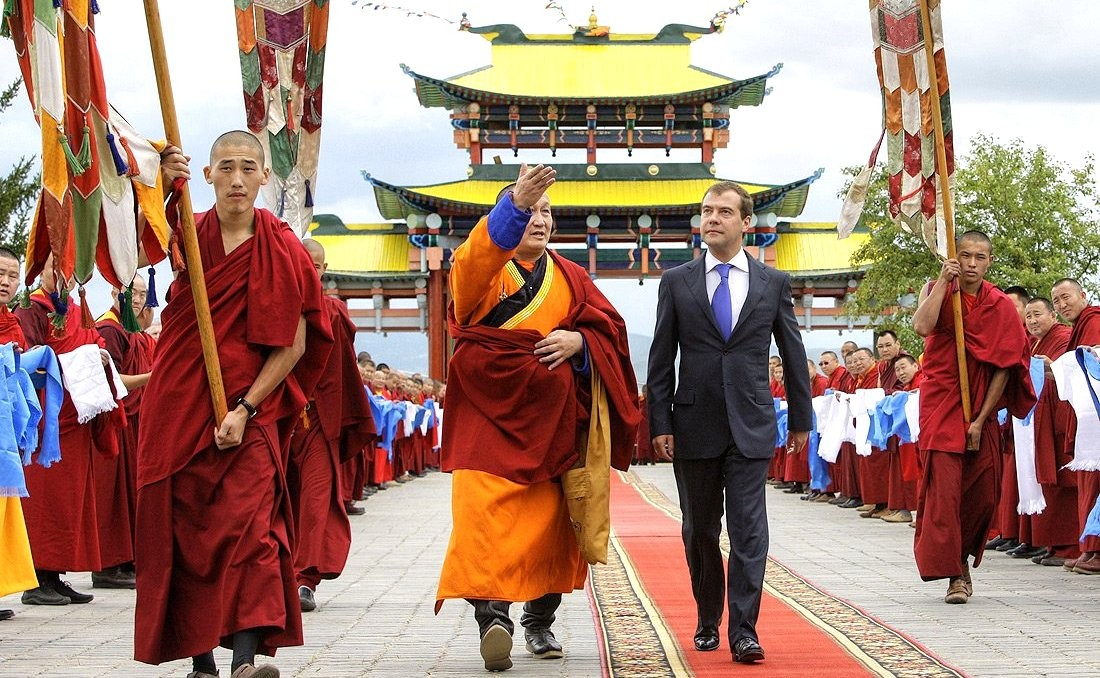
Buddhist temple in Buryatia, Russia

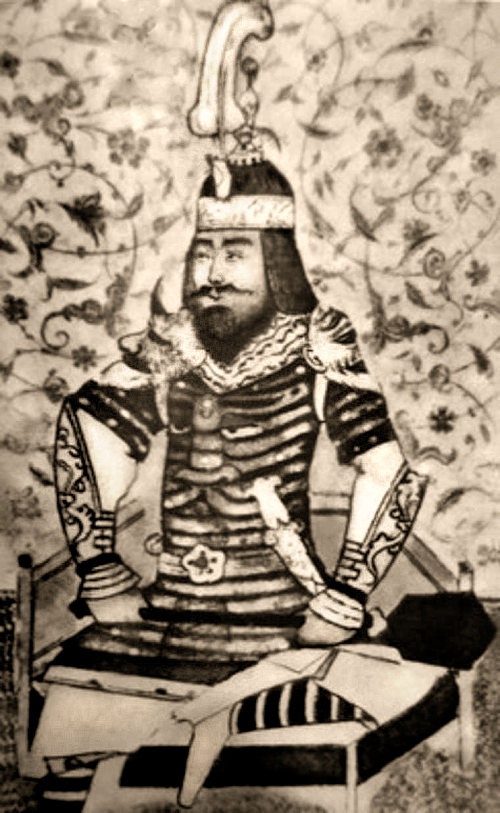
Timur of Mongolic origin himself had converted almost all the Borjigin leaders to Islam.

The original religion of the Mongolic peoples was Mongolian shamanism. The Xianbei came in contact with Confucianism and Daoism but eventually adopted Buddhism. However, the Xianbeis and some other people in Mongolia and Rourans followed a form of shamanism. In the 5th century, the Buddhist monk Dharmapriya was proclaimed "State Teacher" of the Rouran Khaganate and 3,000 families and some Rouran nobles became Buddhists. In 511, the Rouran Douluofubadoufa Khan sent Hong Xuan to the Tuoba court with a pearl-encrusted statue of the Buddha as a gift. The Tuoba Xianbei and Khitans were mostly Buddhists, although they still retained their original Shamanism. The Tuoba had a "sacrificial castle" to the west of their capital where ceremonies to spirits took place. Wooden statues of the spirits were erected on top of this sacrificial castle. One ritual involved seven princes with milk offerings who ascended the stairs with 20 female shamans and offered prayers, sprinkling the statues with the sacred milk. The Khitan had their holiest shrine on Mount Muye where portraits of their earliest ancestor Qishou Khagan, his wife Kedun and eight sons were kept in two temples. Mongolic peoples were also exposed to Zoroastrianism, Manicheism, Nestorianism, Eastern Orthodoxy, and Islam from the west.

The Mongolic peoples, in particular the Borjigin, had their holiest shrine on Mount Burkhan Khaldun where their ancestor Börte Chono (Blue Wolf) and Goo Maral (Beautiful Doe) had given birth to them. Genghis Khan usually fasted, prayed and meditated on this mountain before his campaigns. As a young man, he had thanked the mountain for saving his life and prayed at the foot of the mountain sprinkling offerings and bowing nine times to the east with his belt around his neck and his hat held at his chest. Genghis Khan kept a close watch on the Mongolic supreme shaman Kokochu Teb who sometimes conflicted with his authority. Later, Tengrism, the imperial cult of Genghis Khan centered on the eight white gers and nine white banners in Ordos grew into a highly organized indigenous religion with scriptures in the Mongolian script. Indigenous moral precepts of the Mongolic peoples were enshrined in oral wisdom sayings (now collected in several volumes), the anda (blood-brother) system and ancient texts such as the Chinggis-un Bilig (Wisdom of Genghis) and Oyun Tulkhuur (Key of Intelligence). These moral precepts were expressed in poetic form and mainly involved truthfulness, fidelity, help in hardship, unity, self-control, fortitude, veneration of nature, veneration of the state, and veneration of parents.

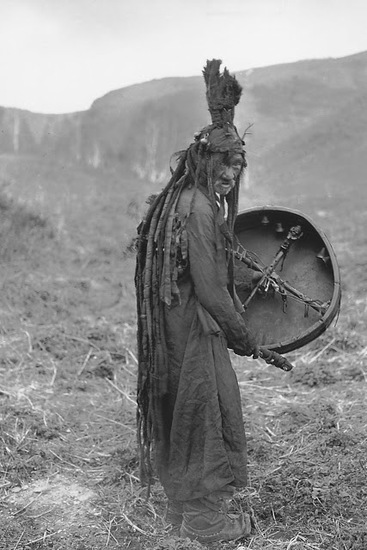
A Mongolian shaman, photo by Sakari Pälsi, 1909

In 1254, Möngke Khan organized a formal religious debate (in which William of Rubruck took part) between Christians, Muslims and Buddhists in Karakorum, a cosmopolitan city of many religions. The Mongolic Empire was known for its religious tolerance, but had a special leaning towards Buddhism and was sympathetic towards Christianity while still worshipping Tengri. The Mongolic leader Abaqa Khan sent a delegation of 13–16 to the Second Council of Lyon (1274), which created a great stir, particularly when their leader 'Zaganus' underwent a public baptism. A joint crusade was announced in line with the Franco-Mongol alliance but did not materialize because Pope Gregory X died in 1276. Yahballaha III (1245–1317) and Rabban Bar Sauma (c. 1220–1294) were famous Mongolic Nestorian Christians. The Keraites in central Mongolia were Christian. In Istanbul the Church of Saint Mary of the Mongols stands as a reminder of the Byzantine-Mongol alliance.

Melig, the younger son of Ögedei, was the first of the Mongolian royal line to accept Islam. The western Khanates, however, eventually adopted Islam (under Berke and Ghazan) and the Turkic languages (because of their commercial importance), although allegiance to the Great Khan and limited use of the Mongolic languages can be seen even in the 1330s. In 1521, the first Mughal emperor Babur took part in a military banner milk-sprinkling ceremony in the Chagatai Khanate where the Mongolian language was still used. Al-Adil Kitbugha (reigned 1294–1296), a Mongol Sultan of Egypt, and the half-Mongol An-Nasir Muhammad (reigned till 1341) built the Madrassa of Al-Nasir Muhammad in Cairo, Egypt. An-Nasir's Mongol mother was Ashlun bint Shaktay. The Mongolic nobility during the Yuan dynasty studied Confucianism, built Confucian temples (including Beijing Confucius Temple) and translated Confucian works into Mongolic but mainly followed the Sakya school of Tibetan Buddhism under Phags-pa Lama.

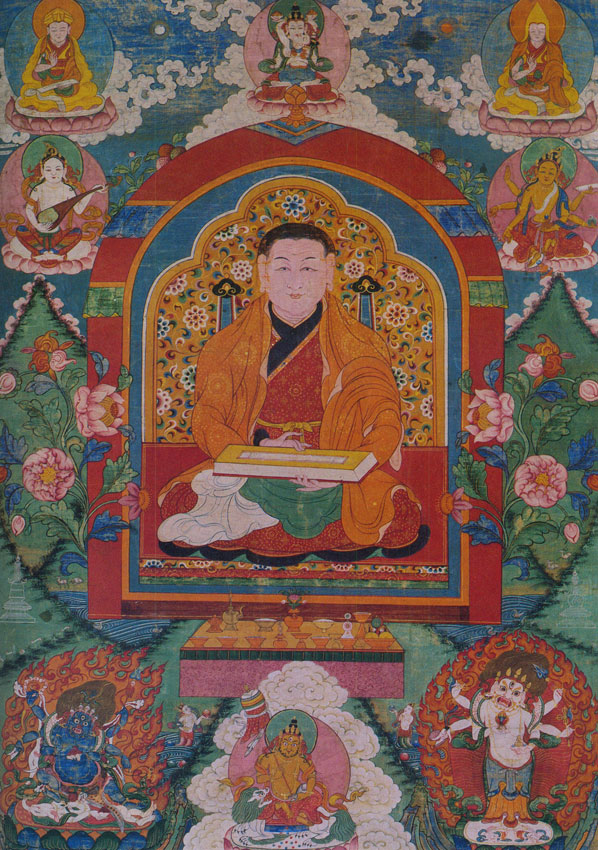
Self-portrait of Zanabazar, the Buddhist spiritual leader of Mongolia from 1649 until his death in 1723

The general populace still practised Shamanism. Dongxiang and Bonan people adopted Islam, as did Moghol-speaking peoples in Afghanistan. In the 1576 the Gelug school of Tibetan Buddhism became the state religion of Mongolia. The Red Hat school of Tibetan Buddhism coexisted with the Gelug Yellow Hat school which was founded by the half-Mongol Je Tsongkhapa (1357–1419). Shamanism was absorbed into the state religion while being marginalized in its purer forms, later only surviving in far northern Mongolia. Monks were some of the leading intellectuals in Mongolia, responsible for much of the literature and art of the pre-modern period. Many Buddhist philosophical works lost in Tibet and elsewhere are preserved in older and purer form in Mongolian ancient texts (e.g. the Mongol Kanjur). Zanabazar (1635–1723), Zaya Pandita (1599–1662), and Danzanravjaa (1803–1856) are among the most famous Mongol holy men. The 4th Dalai Lama Yonten Gyatso (1589–1617), a Mongol himself, is recognized as the only non-Tibetan Dalai Lama although the current 14th Dalai Lama is of Mongolic Monguor extraction. The name is a combination of the Mongolian word dalai meaning "ocean" and the Tibetan word (bla-ma) meaning "guru, teacher, mentor".

Many Buryats became Orthodox Christians due to the Russian expansion. During the socialist period, religion was officially banned, although it was practiced in clandestine circles. Today, a sizable proportion of Mongolic peoples are atheist or agnostic. In the most recent census in Mongolia, almost forty percent of the population reported as being atheist, while the majority religion was Tibetan Buddhism, with 53%. Having survived suppression by the communists, Buddhism among the Eastern, Northern, Southern, and Western Mongols is today primarily of the Gelugpa school of Tibetan Buddhism. There is a strong shamanistic influence in the Gelugpa sect among the Mongols.

== Kinship and family life ==
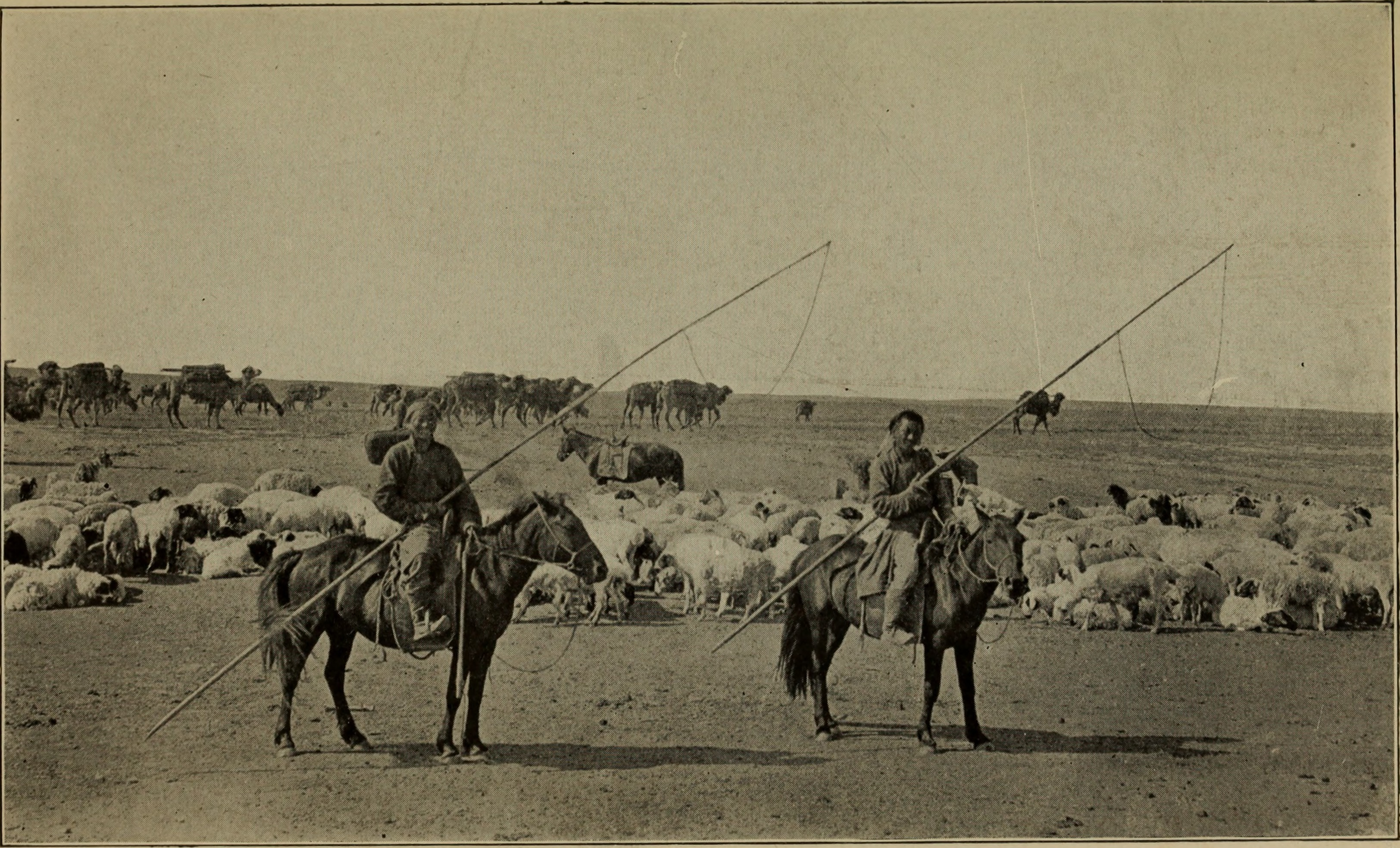
Mongols grazing livestock, by Roy Chapman Andrews photographs in 1921

The traditional Mongol family was patriarchal, patrilineal and patrilocal. Wives were brought for each of the sons, while daughters were married off to other clans. Wife-taking clans stood in a relation of inferiority to wife-giving clans. Thus wife-giving clans were considered "elder" or "bigger" in relation to wife-taking clans, who were considered "younger" or "smaller". This distinction, symbolized in terms of "elder" and "younger" or "bigger" and "smaller", was carried into the clan and family as well, and all members of a lineage were terminologically distinguished by generation and age, with senior superior to junior.

In the traditional Mongolian family, each son received a part of the family herd as he married, with the elder son receiving more than the younger son. The youngest son would remain in the parental tent caring for his parents, and after their death he would inherit the parental tent in addition to his own part of the herd. This inheritance system was mandated by law codes such as the Yassa, created by Genghis Khan. Likewise, each son inherited a part of the family's camping lands and pastures, with the elder son receiving more than the younger son. The eldest son inherited the farthest camping lands and pastures, and each son in turn inherited camping lands and pastures closer to the family tent until the youngest son inherited the camping lands and pastures immediately surrounding the family tent. Family units would often remain near each other and in close cooperation, though extended families would inevitably break up after a few generations. It is probable that the Yasa simply put into written law the principles of customary law.

It is apparent that in many cases, for example in family instructions, the yasa tacitly accepted the principles of customary law and avoided any interference with them. For example, Riasanovsky said that killing the man or the woman in case of adultery is a good illustration. Yasa permitted the institutions of polygamy and concubinage so characteristic of southerly nomadic peoples. Children born of concubines were legitimate. Seniority of children derived their status from their mother. Eldest son received more than the youngest after the death of father. But the latter inherited the household of the father. Children of concubines also received a share in the inheritance, in accordance with the instructions of their father (or with custom).

— Nilgün Dalkesen, Gender roles and women's status in Central Asia and Anatolia between the thirteenth and sixteenth centuries

After the family, the next largest social units were the subclan and clan. These units were derived from groups claiming patrilineal descent from a common ancestor, ranked in order of seniority (the "conical clan"). By the Chingissid era this ranking was symbolically expressed at formal feasts, in which tribal chieftains were seated and received particular portions of the slaughtered animal according to their status. The lineage structure of Central Asia had three different modes. It was organized on the basis of genealogical distance, or the proximity of individuals to one another on a graph of kinship; generational distance, or the rank of generation in relation to a common ancestor, and birth order, the rank of brothers in relation to each another. The paternal descent lines were collaterally ranked according to the birth of their founders, and were thus considered senior and junior to each other. Of the various collateral patrilines, the senior in order of descent from the founding ancestor, the line of eldest sons, was the most noble. In the steppe, no one had his exact equal; everyone found his place in a system of collaterally ranked lines of descent from a common ancestor. It was according to this idiom of superiority and inferiority of lineages derived from birth order that legal claims to superior rank were couched.

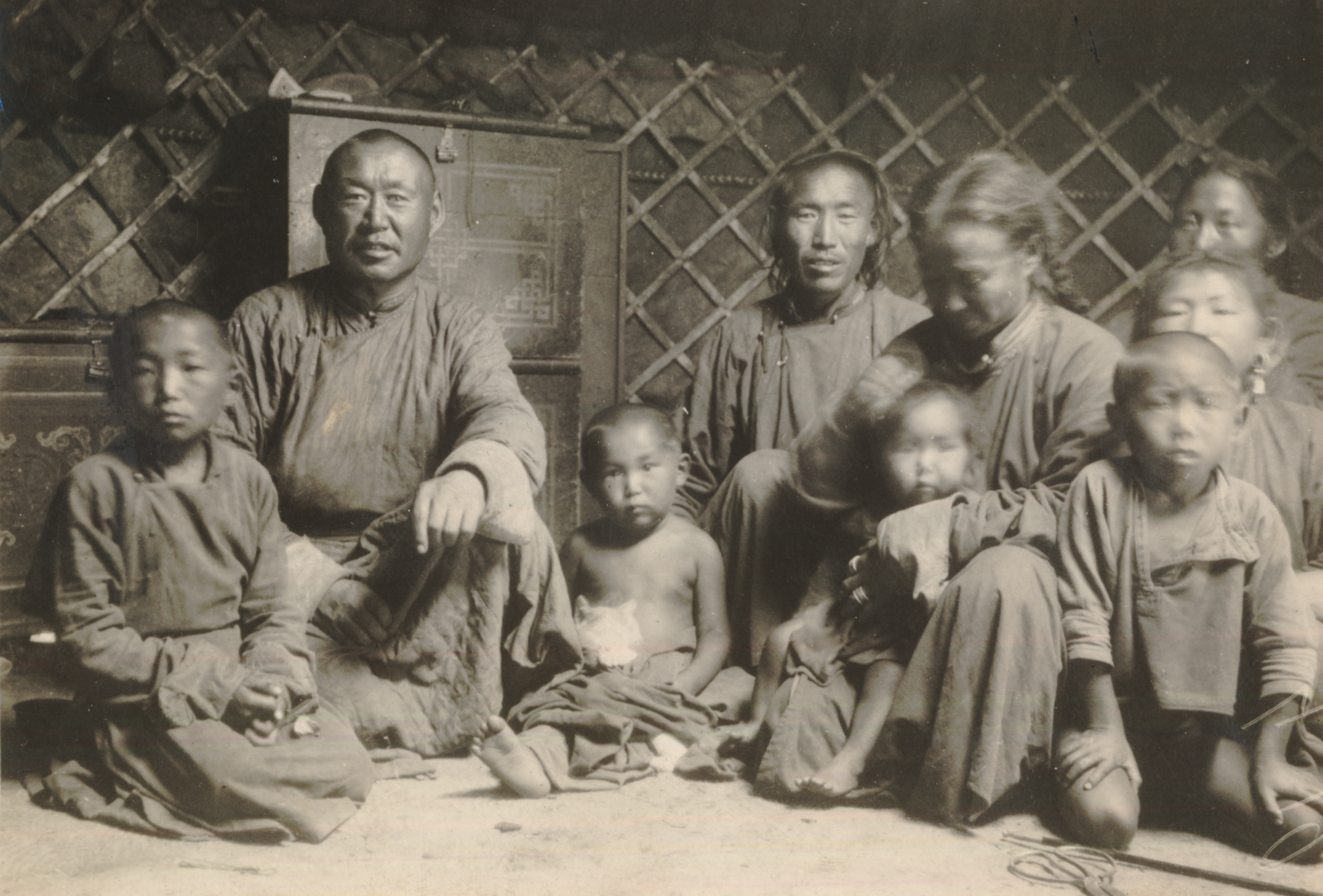
A Mongol family in their ger, 1920

The Mongol kinship is one of a particular patrilineal type classed as Omaha, in which relatives are grouped together under separate terms that crosscut generations, age, and even sexual difference. Thus, one uses different terms for a man's father's sister's children, his sister's children, and his daughter's children. A further attribute is strict terminological differentiation of siblings according to seniority.

The anthropologist Herbert Harold Vreeland visited three Mongol communities in 1920 and published a highly detailed book with the results of his fieldwork, Mongol community and kinship structure.

== Historical population ==
Year	Population	Notes
1 AD	1–2,000,000?	
1000	2,500,000?	750,000 Khitans
1200	2,600,000?	1,5–2,000,000 Mongols
1600	2,300,000?	77,000 Buryats; 600,000 Khalkhas
1700	2,600,000?	600,000 Khalkhas; 1,100,000? Oirats: 600,000 Zunghars, 200–250,000? Kalmyks, 200,000 Upper Mongols
1800	2,000,000?	600,000 Khalkhas; 440,000? Oirats: 120,000 Zunghars, 120,000? Upper Mongols
1900	2,300,000?	283,383 Buryats (1897); 500,000? Khalkhas (1911); 380,000 Oirats: 70,000? Mongolian Oirats (1911), 190,648 Kalmyks (1897), 70,000? Dzungarian and Inner Mongolian Oirats, 50,000 Upper Mongols; 1,500,000? Southern Mongols (1911)
1927	2,100,000?	600,000 Mongolians — 230,000? Buryats: 15,000? Mongolian Buryats, 214,957 Buryats in Russia (1926); 500,000? Khalkhas (1927); 330,000? Oirats: 70,000 Mongolian Oirats, 128,809 Kalmyks (1926)
1956	2,500,000?	228,647 Buryats: 24,625 Mongolian Buryats (1956), 135,798 Buryats of the (Buryat Autonomous Soviet Socialist Republic; 1959), 23,374 Agin-Buryats (1959), 44,850 Ust-Orda Buryats (1959); 639,141 Khalkhas (1956); 240,000? Oirats: 77,996 Mongolian Oirats (1956), 100,603 Kalmyks (1959), 1,462,956 Mongols in China (1953)
1980	4,300,000?	317,966? Buryats: 29,802 Mongolian Buryats (1979), 206,860 Buryatian Buryats (1979), 45,436 Usta-Orda Buryats (1979), 35,868 Agin-Buryats (1979); 1,271,086 Khalkhas; 398,339 Oirats: 127,328 Mongolian Oirats (1979), 140,103 Kalmyks (1979), 2,153,000 Southern Mongols (1981)
1990	4,700,000?	376,629 Buryats: 35,444 Mongolian Buryats (1989), 249,525 Buryatian Buryats (1989), 49,298 Usta-Orda Buryats (1989), 42,362 Agin-Buryats (1989); 1,654,221 Khalkhas; 470,000? Oirats: 161,803 Mongolian Oirats (1989), 165,103 Kalmyks (1989), 33,000 Upper Mongols (1987);
2010	5–9,200,000?	500,000? Buryats (45–75,000 Mongolian Buryats, 10,000 Hulunbuir Buryats); 2,300,000 Khalkhas (including Dariganga, Darkhad, Eljigin and Sartuul); 638,372 Oirats: 183,372 Kalmyks, 205,000 Mongolian Oirats, 90–100, 000 Upper Mongols, 2010 — 140,000 Xinjiang Oirats; 2013 — 190,000? Xinjiang Oirats: 100,000? Torghuts (Kalmyks), 40–50,000? Olots, 40,000? other Oirats: mainly Khoshuts; 1,5–4,000,000? 5,700,000? Southern Mongols

== Geographic distribution ==
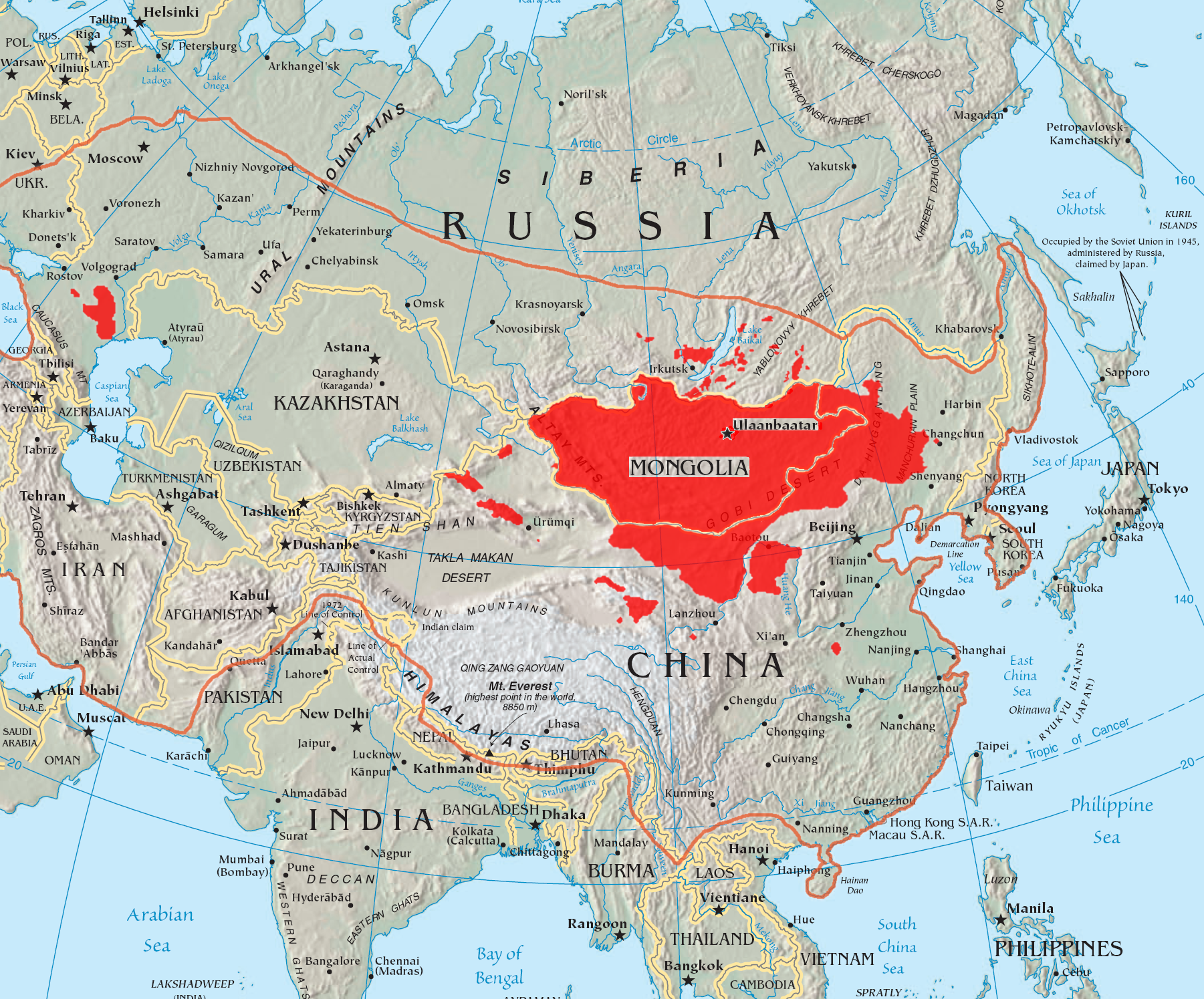
This map shows the boundary of the 13th-century Mongol Empire and location of today's Mongols in modern Mongolia, Russia, and China.

Distribution of Mongol subgroups in the final year of Qing rule (1911)

Today, the majority of Mongols live in the modern states of Mongolia, China (mainly Inner Mongolia and Xinjiang), Russia, Kyrgyzstan, and Afghanistan.

The differentiation between tribes and peoples (ethnic groups) is handled differently depending on the country. The Tumed, Chahar, Ordos, Barga, Altai Uriankhai, Buryats, Dörböd (Dörvöd, Dörbed), Torguud, Dariganga, Üzemchin (or Üzümchin), Bayads, Khoton, Myangad (Mingad), Eljigin, Zakhchin, Darkhad, and Olots (or Öölds or Ölöts) are all considered as tribes of the Mongols.

=== Subgroups ===
The Eastern Mongols are mainly concentrated in Mongolia, including the Khalkha, Eljigin Khalkha, Darkhad, Sartuul Khalkha, and Dariganga (Khalkha).

The Southern or Inner Mongols mainly are concentrated in Inner Mongolia, China. They comprise the Abaga Mongols, Abaganar, Aohans, Arkhorchin, Asud, Baarins, Chahar, Darkhan (Shar Darkhad), Dörvön Khüükhed, Durved, Gorlos, Kharchin, Khishigten, Khorchin, Huuchid, Ikhmyangan, Jalaid, Jaruud, Muumyangan, Naiman (Southern Mongols), Onnigud, Ordos, Sunud, Tümed, Urad, and Uzemchin.

=== Sister groups ===
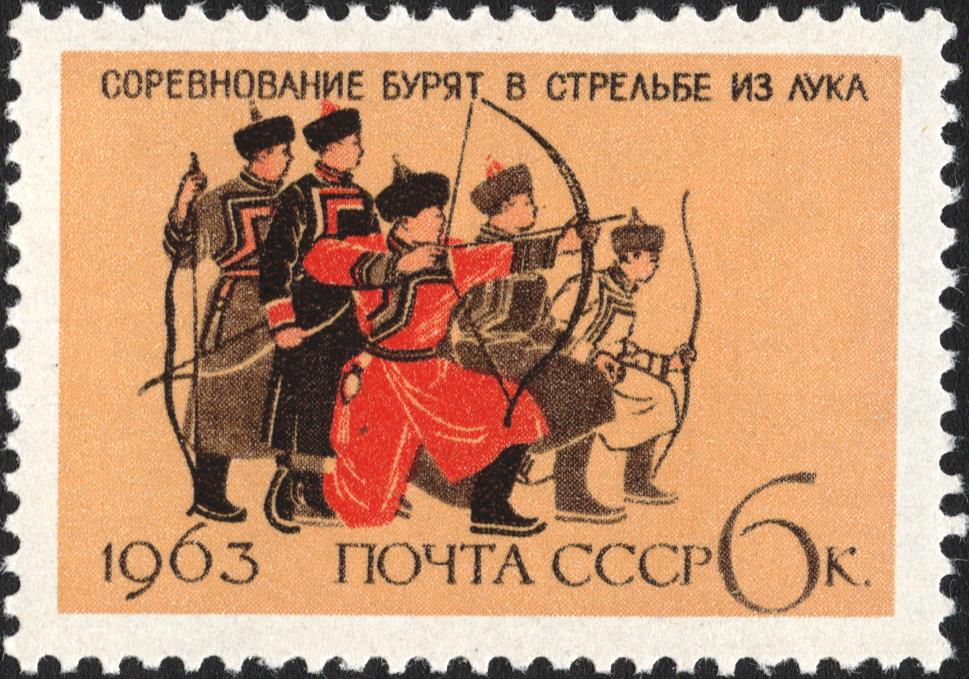
Buryat archery displayed on a Soviet stamp, 1963

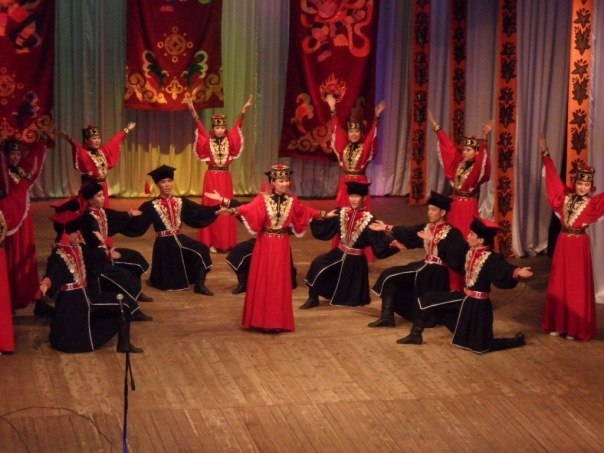
Kalmyk traditional dance

The Buryats are mainly concentrated in their homeland, the Buryat Republic, a federal subject of Russia. They are the major northern subgroup of the Mongols. The Barga Mongols are mainly concentrated in Inner Mongolia, China, along with the Buryats and Hamnigan. Some orientalists also include the Soyots in the Buryat sub-ethnic groups.

The Western Oirats are mainly concentrated in Western Mongolia:

- 184,000 Kalmyks (2010) — Kalmykia, Russia
- 205,000 Mongolian Oirats (2010)
- 140,000 Oirats (2010) — Xinjiang region, China
- 90,000 Upper Mongols (2010) — Qinghai region, China. The Khoshuts are the major subgroup of the Upper Mongols, along with the Choros, Khalkha and Torghuts.
- 12,000 Sart Kalmyks (Zungharian descents) (2012) — Kyrgyzstan. Religion: Sunni Islam.

Altai Uriankhai, Baatud, Bayad, Chantuu, Choros, Durvud, Khoshut, Khoid, Khoton, Myangad, Olots, Sart Kalmyks (mainly Olots), Torghut, Zakhchin.

- Kalmyks — Baatud, Buzava, Choros, Durvud, Khoid, Olots, Torghut.
- Upper Mongolian Oirats — Choros, Khoshut, Torghut.

=== Mongolia ===
In modern-day Mongolia, Mongols make up approximately 95% of the population, with the largest ethnic group being Khalkha Mongols, followed by Buryats, both belonging to the Eastern Mongolian peoples. They are followed by Oirats, who belong to the Western Mongolian peoples.

Mongolian ethnic groups:

- Baarin
- Baatud
- Barga
- Bayad, Buryat
- Selenge Chahar
- Chantuu
- Darkhad
- Dariganga
- Dörbet Oirat
- Eljigin
- Khalkha
- Hamnigan
- Kharchin
- Khoid
- Khorchin
- Khotogoid
- Khoton
- Huuchid
- Myangad
- Olots
- Sartuul
- Torgut
- Tümed
- Üzemchin
- Zakhchin

=== China ===
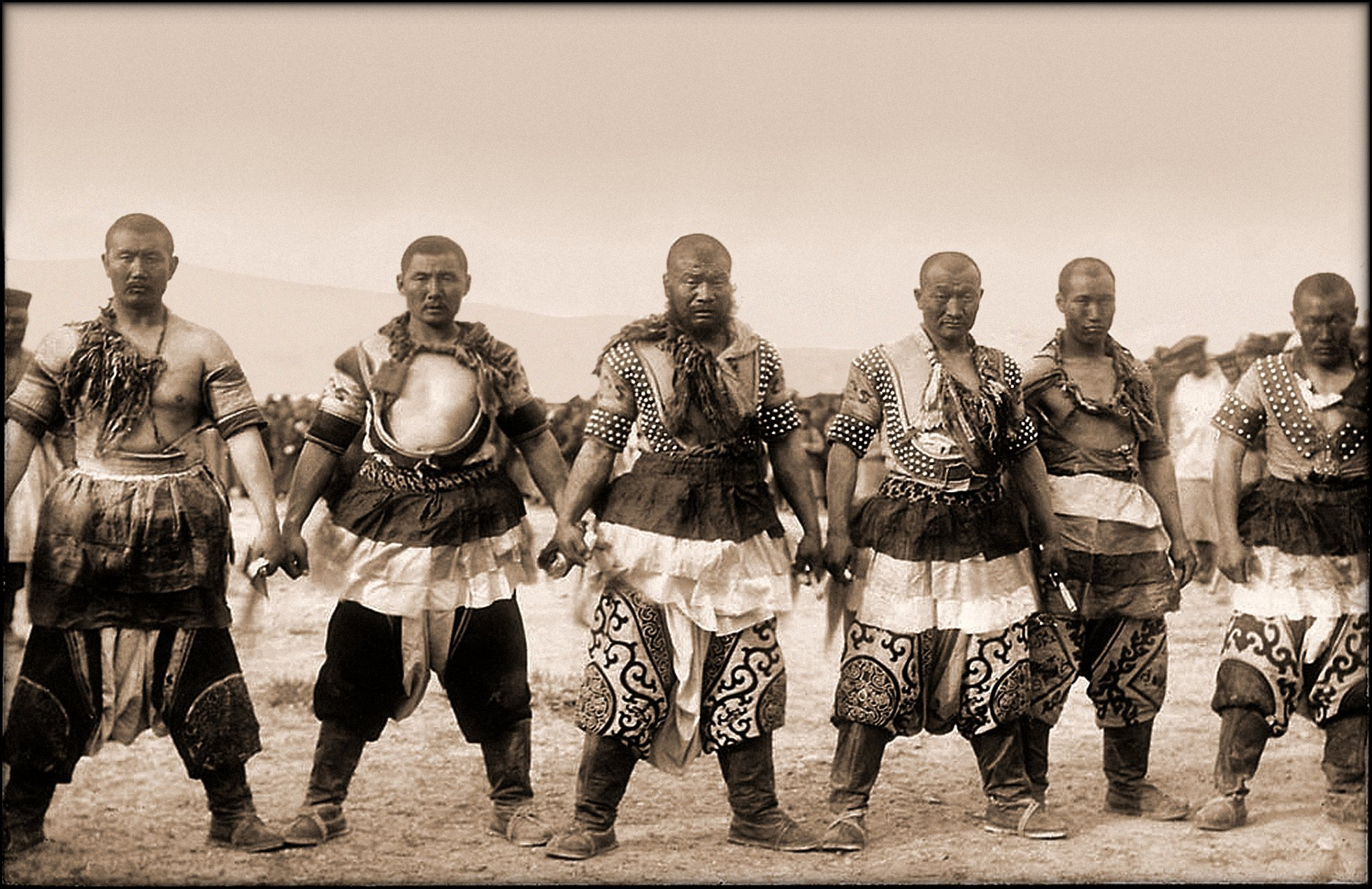
Strong Mongol men at August games. Photo by Wm. Purdom, 1909

The 2010 census of the People's Republic of China counted more than 7 million people of various Mongolic groups. The 1992 census of China counted only 3.6 million ethnic Mongols. The 2010 census counted roughly 5.8 million ethnic Mongols, 621,500 Dongxiangs, 289,565 Mongours, 132,000 Daurs, 20,074 Baoans, and 14,370 Yugurs. Most of them live in the Inner Mongolia Autonomous Region, followed by Liaoning. Small numbers can also be found in provinces near those two.

There were 669,972 Mongols in Liaoning in 2011, making up 11.52% of Mongols in China. The closest Mongol area to the sea is the Dabao Mongol Ethnic Township (大堡蒙古族乡) in Fengcheng, Liaoning. With 8,460 Mongols (37.4% of the township population) it is located 40 km (25 mi) from the North Korean border and 65 km (40 mi) from Korea Bay of the Yellow Sea. Another contender for closest Mongol area to the sea would be Erdaowanzi Mongol Ethnic Township (二道湾子蒙古族乡) in Jianchang County, Liaoning. With 5,011 Mongols (20.7% of the township population) it is located around 65 km (40 mi) from the Bohai Sea.

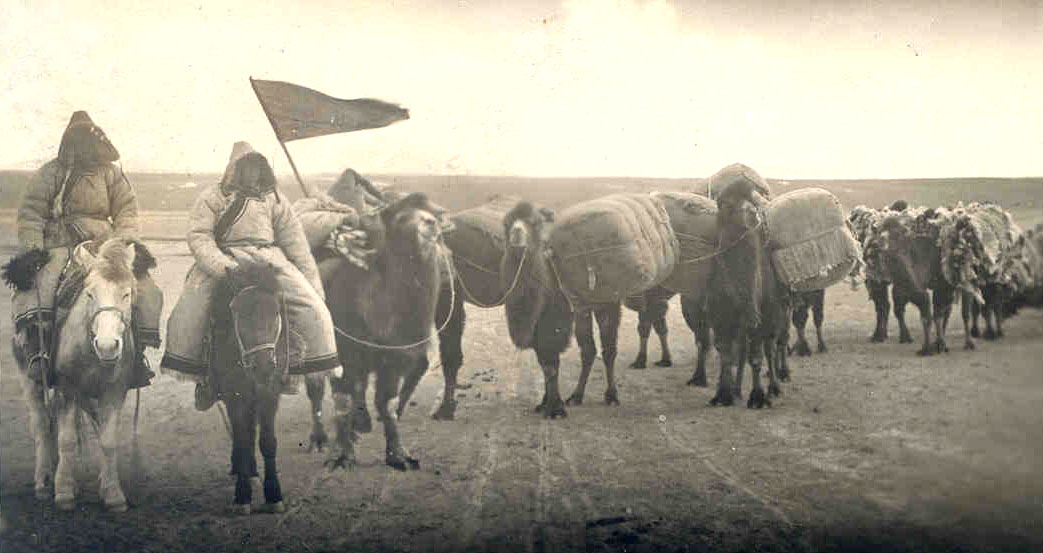
A photo of an Oirat caravan taken in the early 20th century

Other peoples speaking Mongolic languages are the Daur, Sogwo Arig, Monguor people, Dongxiangs, Bonans, Sichuan Mongols and eastern part of the Yugur people. Those do not officially count as part of the Mongol ethnicity, but are recognized as ethnic groups of their own. The Mongols lost their contact with the Mongours, Bonan, Dongxiangs, and Yunnan Mongols since the fall of the Yuan dynasty. Mongolian scientists and journalists met with the Dongxiangs and Yunnan Mongols in the 2000s.

Inner Mongolia: Southern Mongols, Barga, Buryat, Dörbet Oirat, Khalkha, Dzungar people, Eznee Torgut

Xinjiang province: Altai Uriankhai, Chahar, Khoshut, Olots, Torghut, Zakhchin

Qinghai province: Upper Mongols: Choros, Khoshut

=== Russia ===
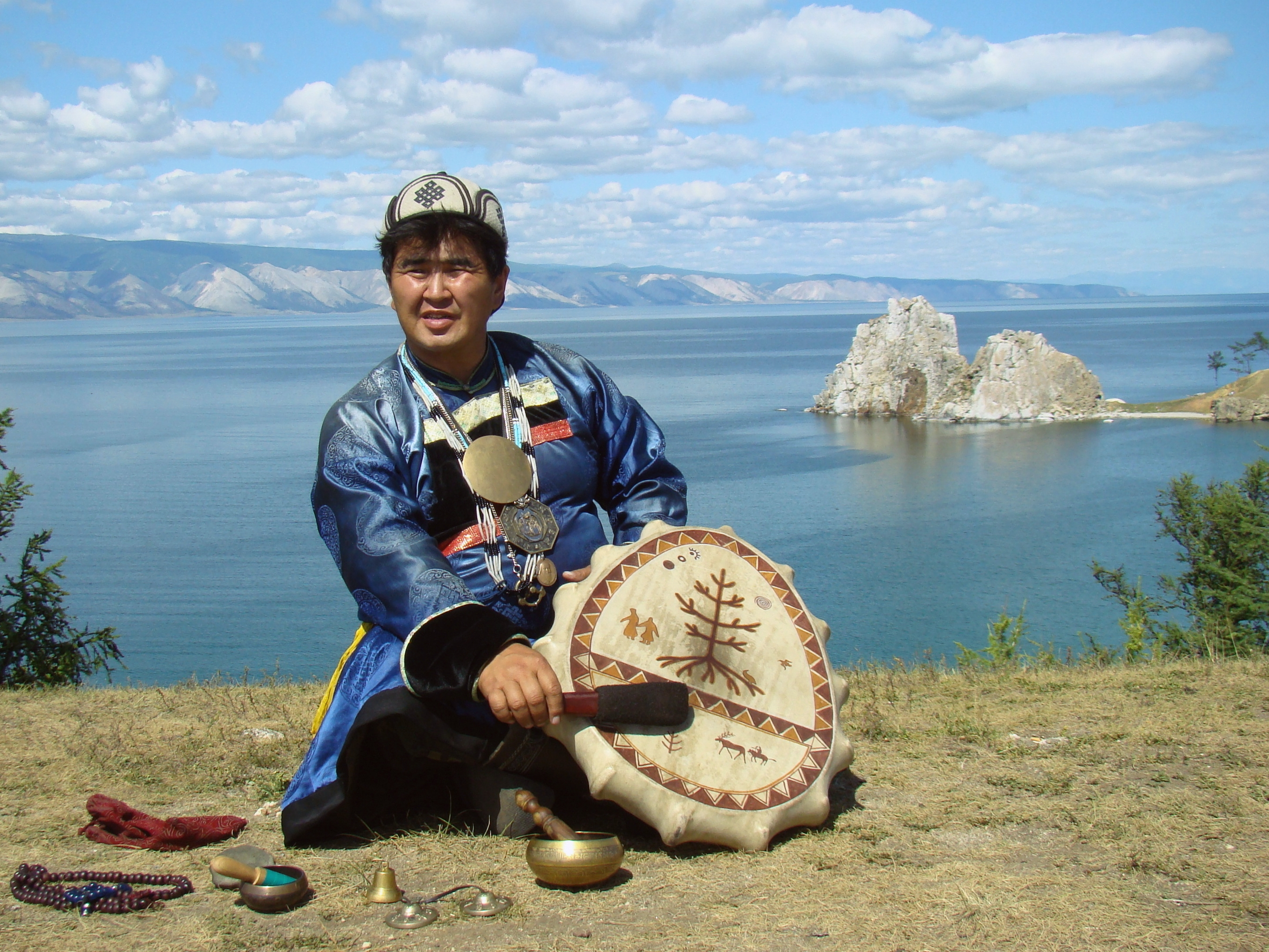
Buryat shaman of Olkhon, Lake Baikal in eastern Siberia

Two Mongolic ethnic groups are present in Russia; the 2010 census found 461,410 Buryats and 183,400 Kalmyks.

=== Elsewhere ===
Smaller numbers of Mongolic peoples exist in Western Europe and North America. Some of the more notable communities exist in South Korea, the United States, the Czech Republic, and the United Kingdom.

== See also ==
- Altan Telgey
- American Center for Mongolian Studies
- Horse culture in Mongolia
- List of medieval Mongol tribes and clans
- List of modern Mongol clans
- List of Mongolians
- List of Mongol states
- Mongolian name
- Mongoloid
- Qara'unas
