= Dariganga Mongols =

- Territories of the Dariganga in 1911

Total population
- 27,412

Regions with significant populations
- Mongolia: 27,412

Languages
- Khalkha dialect of Mongolian

Religion
- Tibetan Buddhism, Shamanism, Atheism

Related ethnic groups
- Mongols, Halh, Chahar, Ööled

Dariganga Mongols

Chinese name
- Simplified Chinese: 达里冈爱蒙古
Transcriptions

Mongolian name
- Mongolian Cyrillic: Дарьганга
- Mongolian script: ᠳᠠᠷᠢᠭᠠᠩᠭ᠎ᠠ

The Dariganga (Mongolian: Дарьганга) are an eastern Mongol subgroup who mainly live in Dari Ovoo and Ganga Lake, Sukhbaatar Province.

It is believed that the Dariganga were resettled by the Qing Dynasty from Chahar, Khalkha and Ööled to herd horses of the Emperor in the late 1690s.

From 1912 on, a Ministry of Internal Affairs of the Boghda Khaanate of Mongolia supervised them. And the People's Republic of Mongolia changed their banner system in 1921. After many reforms in Mongolian administration structure, the Dariganga people have lived in the sums: Dariganga, Naran, Ongon, Khalzan, Asgat and Bayandelger of Sukhbaatar Province since 1691.
