= Dörbet Oirat =

Branch of Oirat-Mongols

Dörbet ᠳᠥᠷᠪᠡᠳ
- Territories of the Dörbet in 1911

Total population
- 130,000–150,000

Regions with significant populations
- Mongolia: 72,403
- Russia: 54,000

Languages
- Oirat, Russian, Mongolian

Religion
- Tibetan Buddhism, Mongolian Shamanism, Atheism

Related ethnic groups
- Mongols, especially Oirats

The Dörbet (UK: /ˈdɜːbɛt/, US: /ˈdɔːrbɛt/), (Note: Kalmyk: Дөрвд, romanized: Dörwd, IPA: [dørˈwyt]; Mongolian: Дөрвөд, romanized: Dörbhöd, IPA: [ˈtɵrʷʊt]; Chinese: 杜尔伯特部; pinyin: Dùrbótè Bù) known in English as The Fours, is the second largest subgroup of Mongol people in modern Mongolia and was formerly one of the major tribes of the Four Oirat confederation in the 15th-18th centuries. In early times, the Dörbets and the Ööld were overruled by collateral branches of the Choros lineage. The Dörbets are distributed among the western provinces of Mongolia, Kalmykia and in a small portion in Heilongjiang, China. In modern-day Mongolia, the Dörbets are centered in Uvs Province.

== History ==
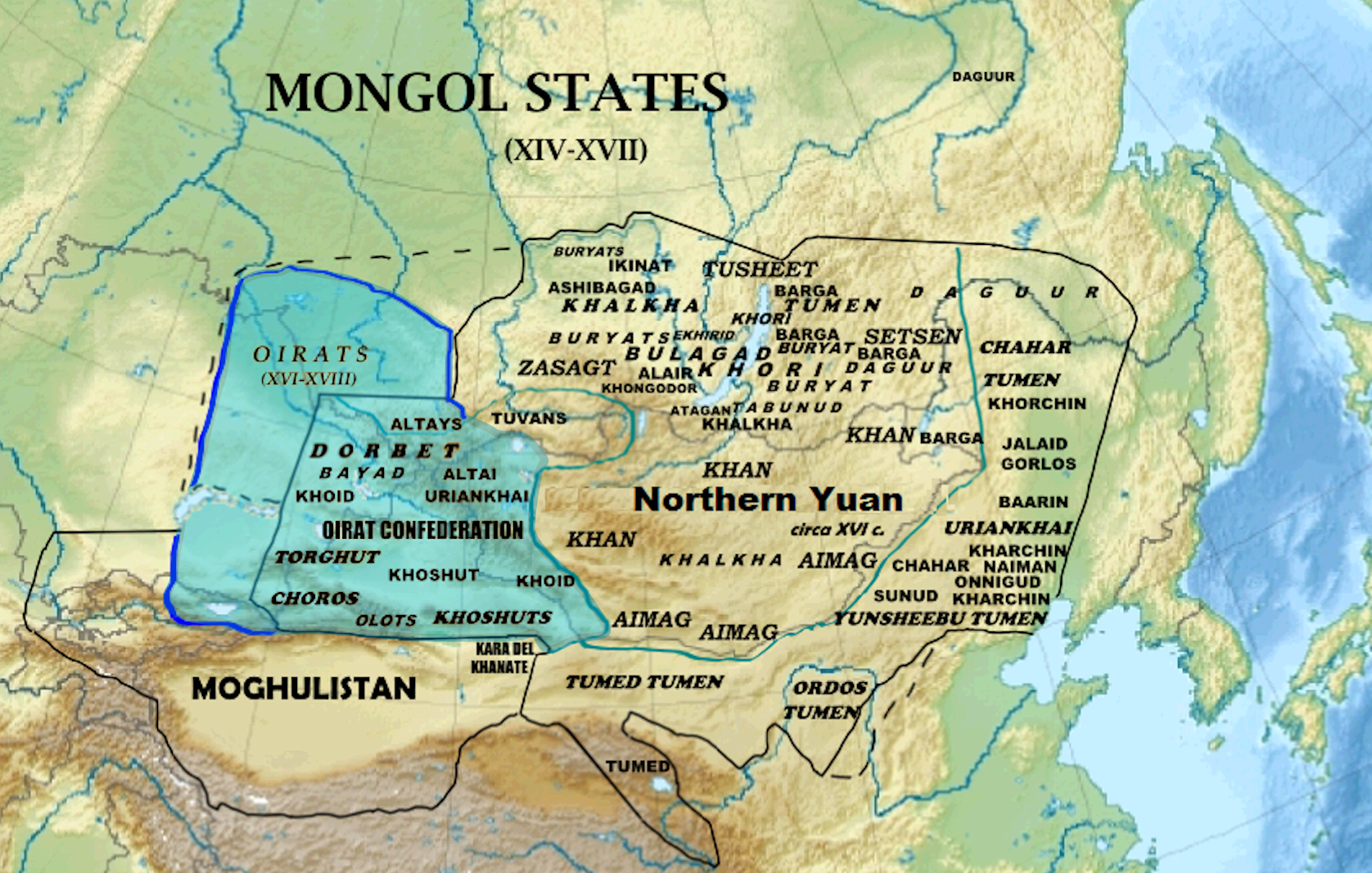
Location of the Oirat Confederation, which the Dörbet tribe was a member of, 16th century

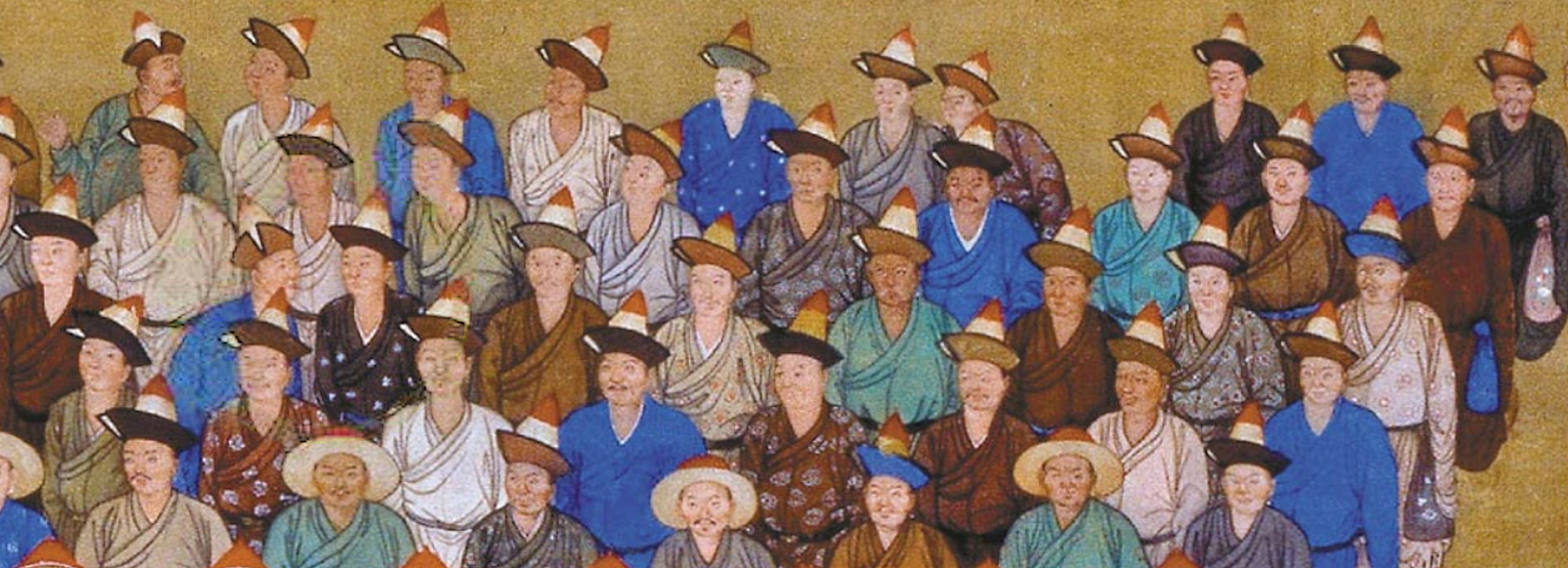
Dörbet delegation to the camp of the Chinese Qianlong Emperor in the Chengde Mountain Resort in 1754, in 萬樹園賜宴圖, painted in 1755 by Jean-Denis Attiret

A Dörben clan existed within the Mongol tribe in the 12th–13th centuries, but the Dörbets appear as an Oirat tribe only in the latter half of the 16th century. What their relation, if any, is to the Dörben clan of the 12th–13th centuries is unclear. The name probably means "döröv"; "four" (Middle Mongolian: dörbe).

In the 17th century, the leader of Dörbets was Dalai Taishi (d.1637). In order to unite the Oirats, Dalai Taishi used the method of marriage of convenience; Dalai Taishi and Khoshut leader Güshi Khan married the Torghut leader Kho Orluk sisters. During the Dalai Taishi period (circa 1625), the Oirat tribes lived in harmony.

In 1616, Dalai Taishi established diplomatic relations with the Tsardom of Russia. The next year Dalai Taishi's son Solom Tseren joined the Kalmyks on the Volga with 4,000 households. In 1699 a body of the Dörbets joined the Don Cossacks, eventually becoming the Buzava Kalmyks. Trapped west of the Volga, the Do'rbets could not join the 1771 flight of the Torguds, and hence dominated the remaining Kalmyks. In the early 19th century, they had split into the Lesser Dörbets, living in northern Kalmykia and the Greater Dörbets, living around Lake Manych-Gudilo.

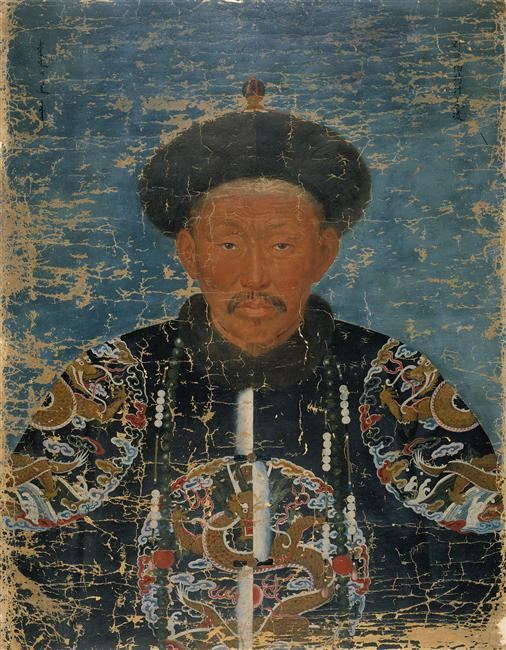
Tseren (车凌, 1697-1758), leader of the Mongolian Tribe of the Dorbet, in Qing dynasty costume.

Meanwhile, the Dörbets in the Oirat homeland remained a major sub-group of the Dzungars. In 1753 during a worsening civil war amongst the Oirat, three Dörbet leaders submitted to the Qing dynasty. They were resettled first in Bayankhongor Province, and then in Uvs Province in 1759. They formed into 16 banners of the Sain Zayaatu Leagues. The Dörbets nobility's 15,000 subjects included Bayids and a small number of Khotongs.

From the 1880s, the Khalkha influenced Dörbet socio-economic trends. The Kalmyk Dambijantsan headed the anti-communist disturbances; and separatist feeling remained strong until the 1930s.

== Number ==
The Dörbets in Mongolia numbered 55,200 in 1989. In 2000 - 66,706.

== Notable people ==
- Yumjaagiin Tsedenbal – former Prime Minister of People's Republic of Mongolia and general secretary of Mongolian People's Revolutionary Party
- Begziin Givaan – the Hero of the People's Republic of Mongolia
- Nasanjargaliin Darjaa – Former minister of Food and Agriculture
- Puntsagiin Ulaankhuu – former vice minister of Agriculture
- Zodoviin Omboo – Mongolian notable physicist
