= Genmou =

Genmou (根牟, OC:*‍kɯ:n-mu (ZS), mod. Gēnmóu) was a vassal state during the Zhou dynasty in ancient China. Genmou was founded by the Eastern Yi and was conquered by the state of Lu in the 9th year of Lu's Duke Xuan's reign (600 BCE).

Military general, politician, and classicist Du Yu (223–285) stated that in his time, there was a Mou township (牟郷) in the eastern part of Yangdu district (陽都縣), Langya Commandery (琅邪[郡]), corresponding to present-day Yishui County, Shandong province.

The unofficial history book Lushi (路史, "Grand History") states that Mou was also Genmou, whence arose the surnames Genmou (根牟氏), Mou (牟氏 / 侔氏) and Mousun (牟孫氏) later.

Huang Pilie (1763–1825) identifies the Genmou (根牟) with the Xianmou (鮮牟), an Eastern Yi people who, according to Discourses of the States, tended to the ceremonial torches along with the Chu for an alliance-covenant ceremony convened by king Cheng of Zhou on the southern slope of Mount Qi. (Note: Huang also contends that, due to scribal error, in one copy 鮮牟 Xianmou became 鮮卑 Xianbei.) (Note: Eastern Wu scholar Wei Zhao, who annotates Discourses of the States, distinguishes the Xianmou from the Xianbei; he assigns Eastern Yi origin to the Xianmou yet Mountain Rong origin to the Xianbei. For more on the Xianbei's origin, see the article Xianbei.)
