= Sartuul =

Mongolian clan

Sartuul (Mongolian: Сартуул) is one of the Mongol clans. A common hypothesis is the origin of the Sartuuls from the Sarts. Another hypothesis is the version that traces the origin of the Sartuuls to an area called Sarta Uula (Moon Mountain) or Sart Uul (Mountain with the Moon), the name of a mountain where they live. During the Chinese Qing dynasty rule, there was a banner named Tsetsen Sartuul's hoshuu (Wise Sartuul's banner) and descendants of the banner began to use its name as a clan name when Mongolians began using their ancestors' clan names after 1990.

9 khutagts of Khalkha and 2 presidents of Mongolia are from the Tsetsen Sartuul's hoshuu.

== See also ==
- List of modern Mongol clans
- List of medieval Mongol tribes and clans
