= Myangad =

Western Mongolic ethnic group

Regions with significant populations
- Mongolia: 6592 (2010)

Languages
- Oirat

Religion
- Tibetan Buddhism, Mongolian shamanism

Related ethnic groups
- Mongols, especially Oirats

The Myangad people live in Myangad sum of Khovd Province, Mongolia.
