= Dari Ovoo =

- Location within Mongolia

Highest point
- Elevation: 1,354 m (4,442 ft)
- Coordinates: 45°18′38″N 113°50′6″E

Geography
- Location: Mongolia

Geology
- Mountain type: extinct volcano

The Dari Ovoo (Mongolian: Дарь овоо), also known as Altan Ovoo (Mongolian: Алтан овоо, lit. "golden+ovoo"), is an extinct volcano in the Dariganga district, Sukhbaatar Province in eastern Mongolia. It has an elevation of 1,354 metres (4,442 ft). The mountain is a regional sacred mountain in Mongolia.
