= Baatud =

Regions with significant populations

Languages
- Oirat

Religion
- Tibetan Buddhism, Mongolian shamanism, Atheism

Related ethnic groups
- Mongols, especially Oirats

The Baatuds ᠪᠠᠠᠲᠦᠳ, ᠪᠠᠭᠠᠲᠦᠳ (baatud, baɣatud) are a sub-ethnic group of the Oirats, who are Mongols. They were a large tribe of the Oirats but the Baatuds were divided into other Oirat tribes in the 16th century. Many Baatud people were killed by the Qing dynasty army during the fall of the Dzunghar Khanate (1755-1758). Today very few Baatuds live among the Oirats.
