= Buzava =

Dörbet Oirats who settled within modern Kalmykia alongside the Don Cossacks

The Buzava or Buzava Kalmyks are the ethnic Kalmyk people centered in the western Republic of Kalmykia, in the present day Southern Federal District of Russia.

In 1699, a group of the Dörbets of Oirat, a Choros clan within the Oirat tribe, migrated from the Buddhist Kalmyk people in the Volga River area to join the Don Cossacks people. They eventually came to be called the Buzava Kalmyks, which some scholars posit comes from a combination of the Kalmyk words bu (rifle) and zava (showed), to mean roughly 'those who showed rifles.'

They resettled with the Don Cossacks along the middle and lower Don River in Kalmykia.
