= Olot people =

Major group of Oirat-Mongols

Olots
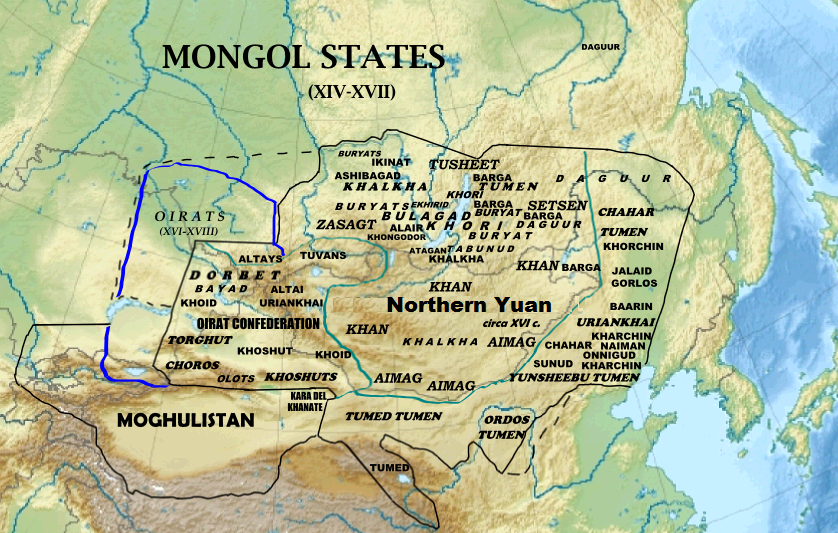
- Image showing the location of the Olots

Regions with significant populations
- Mongolia: 15,520 (2010)
- China: 40,000
- Kyrgyzstan: ~12,000

Languages
- Oirat

Religion
- Tibetan Buddhism, Mongolian shamanism

Related ethnic groups
- Mongols, especially Oirats

The Olot people (/ˈoʊlɒt/; Mongolian: Өөлд Ööld [ˈɵɮʊ̆t]) are an Oirat sub-ethnic group of Choros origin. They were one of the strongest tribes of the Oirats. Today, Mongolian Olots live in Erdenebüren and Ölziit sums. There are a few Olots in Hulunbuir region and around 40,000 Olots in Xinjiang province of China. Ölziit Olots absorbed into the Khalkha Mongols, and the Erdenebüren Olots of around 3,000 retained their Oirat heritage.

== See also ==
- Demographics of Mongolia
- Dzungar people
- Oirats
