= Chantuu =

People in Hovd, Mongolia of Turkic origin

Regions with significant populations
- Mongolia: 132 (2010 census)

Languages
- Uyghur and Oirat

Religion
- Muslim

Related ethnic groups
- Uyghurs

The Chantuu people (Mongolian: Чантуу, ᠴᠢᠩᠲᠤᠤ ), are a group of Uyghurs residing in Hovd province, Mongolia. Unlike the Khotons, the Chantuu arrived in Mongolia later, alongside the Kazakhs during their migrations to the region. This distinction underscores the Chantuu's closer historical and cultural ties to Uyghurs. Their name derives from the term Chantou (Chinese: 纏頭), historically used to describe certain Turkic peoples in Central Asia.

The Chantuu people predominantly practice Islam, aligning with their Uyghur heritage and cultural traditions. While small in number, with 132 individuals recorded in the 2010 Mongolian census, they have maintained their distinct cultural and religious identity. Unlike the Khotons, who adopted Buddhist and Tengrist practices, the Chantuu have preserved their Islamic traditions.

== Notable Figures ==
- B. Chantuu, a journalist.

== See also ==
- Demographics of Mongolia
- Zunghar Khanate
