= Huang Pilie =

Chinese bibliophile (1763–1825)

Huang Pilie (Chinese: 黄丕烈; 1763-1825) was a Chinese bibliophile from Suzhou. He collected and sold books for over 40 years. He owned a bookstore called Pangxi Yuan (English: the Garden of Rushing Happiness). The bookstore opened in 1825 and he died the same year. His store sold many genres of books, ranging from pornography to academic works. Huang annotated the books in his own collection. Books from his collection are held in the National Central Library.
