= Eljigin =

Major group of the Mongols

The Eljigin people are a Khalkha Mongolian sub-ethnic group. They live in Uvs province. The name sounds similar to the Mongolian word "el" for "this" and the Turkic word "tegin" for "lord".
