= Feodor Iwanowitsch Kalmyk =

Russian-German painter (1765–1832)

- Фёдор Иванович Калмык
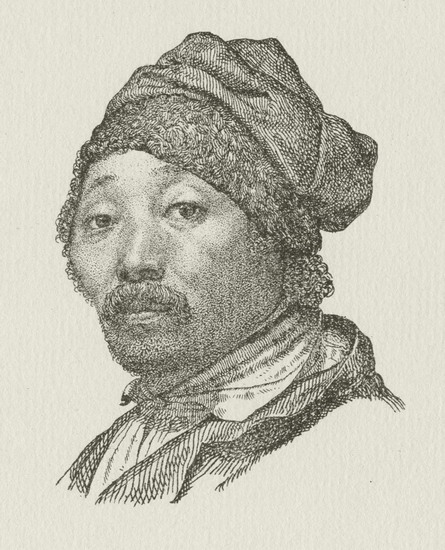
- Feodor Iwanowitsch Kalmyk, self-portrait (1815)
- Born: 1763 or 1765; Kalmyk Khanate
- Died: January 27, 1832 (aged 68–69); Karlsruhe, Grand Duchy of Baden
- Education: Joseph Melling; Philipp Jakob Becker
- Known for: Painting

Feodor Iwanowitsch Kalmyk (1763 or 1765 – January 27, 1832), also known as Kalmyk (Russian Фёдор Иванович Калмык), was a Kalmyk painter and engraver. He called himself Feodor Ivannoff, and that is how he is listed in the Karlsruhe address books. He also signed his will under that name.

== Life and work ==
Kalmyk was probably born on the Kalmyk Khanate. When the Kalmyks returned to the old settlement area on the Altai, he was captured by the Cossacks in 1770 and brought as a serf to St. Petersburg at the Tsar's court of Catherine the Great. There he was baptized and given his name. In 1773, Catherine gave the page boy to the Landgravine Countess Palatine Caroline of Zweibrücken, who was visiting St. Petersburg. Thence, Feodor traveled with her to Darmstadt.

After the Landgravine's untimely death in March 1774, her daughter Friederike Amalie (1754–1832) took care of him. Feodor came to Karlsruhe on the occasion of her marriage to the Hereditary Prince of Baden Charles Louis (1755-1818), the eldest son of Margrave Charles Frederick of Baden (1728-1811). He received his education in Karlsruhe, and at the Philanthropinum Marschlins.

Feodor Ivannoff's artistic talent was soon recognized at the Karlsruhe court and he was trained by court painters Joseph Melling and Philipp Jakob Becker. The focus of his training was on drawing and copperplate engraving. Supported by recommendations from his teachers, Feodor Ivannoff was then able to go on a study trip to Italy. He used the nine years from 1791, which he spent mostly in Rome, to study classical antiquity and the great painters and sculptors of the Italian Renaissance, particularly Lorenzo Ghiberti, Michelangelo and Raphael.

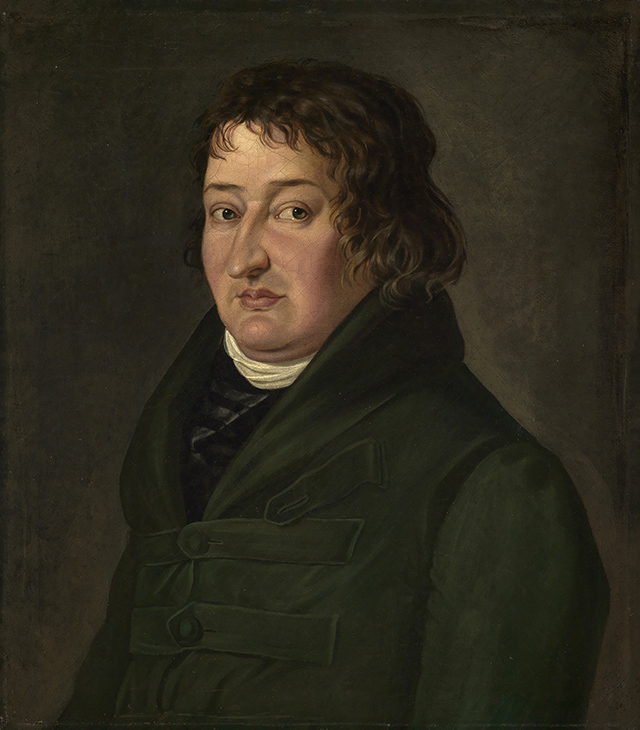
Portrait of the architect Friedrich Weinbrenner, 1820, Staatliche Kunsthalle Karlsruhe

Feodor Ivannoff created drawings and copperplate engravings from many ancient works. He was renowned for his precision and detailed reproduction. In 1800 he traveled with five other artists, including the Italian painter Giovanni Battista Lusieri (1755–1821) and the Italian architectural draftsman Sebastiano Ittar (1768–1847), to Athens to work on behalf of Lord Elgin (1766–1841) to document the Acropolis and other ancient temples in pictures and to take plaster casts of figures and relief panels. Lord Elgin then went a step further and between 1801 and 1803 had large parts of the sculptural jewelry, the frieze and the metopes of the Parthenon, the so-called Elgin Marbles, shipped to London, removing about half of the surviving sculptures of the Parthenon, as well as sculptures from the Propylaea and Erechtheum, which earned him a lot of criticism during his lifetime.

In 1803 Feodor Ivannoff also traveled to London, where he was supposed to etch around 100 drawings made in Athens. This did not happen, however, since Lord Elgin was held for several years in France as Napoleon's prisoner of war on his way home. Feodor Ivannoff left London in 1805 and returned to Karlsruhe via Paris in 1806, where he was appointed court painter by Elector Karl Friedrich. As such, he was instrumental in the decoration of the Protestant Church of Karlsruhe: he created a cycle of images from the life of Jesus, which was completed after his death by Franz Joseph Zoll.

Feodor Iwanowitsch Kalmyk died in Karlsruhe in 1832, at the age of about 65.

He was mainly a draftsman and portrait artist. He painted less often in oil. Influenced by the Zeitgeists and thanks to his long stay in Rome, he developed a preference for motifs from Greek and Roman antiquity as well as for religious themes from the Renaissance. Among other things, he created an eleven-part series of engravings from Lorenzo Ghiberti's bronze door to paradise at the Baptistery of Saint John in Florence. His Descent from the Cross (Kreuzabnahme) based on an ivory relief attributed to Michelangelo is also considered a successful example of his artistic work.

An illustrated book by Ivanoff with 12 copper engravings of the Florentine Gates of Paradise, published by the sculptor Heinrich Keller in Rome in 1798, was discussed in an episode of Lieb & Teuer with Janin Ullmann. The episode was filmed in Reinbek Castle, and aired on February 5, 2017 on NDR.

== Works (selection) ==
- Paradise door according to Lorenzo Ghiberti
- Descent from the Cross after Michelangelo
- Paris, hit among women by Hector
- David plays in front of Saul
- The angel comforts Hagar
- A series of stitches with Ganymede motifs based on ancient models
- Hippolytos sarcophagus based on the relief on the Hippolytos Phaedra sarcophagus, Agrigento, Sicily
- Numerous drawings of the Parthenon's metopes
- Numerous portrait drawings
- Paintings on the balustrades of the Evangelical City Church in Karlsruhe (scenes from the life of Christ) (destroyed in World War II)

== Literature ==
- Margrit Elizabeth Velte, 'Leben und Werk des Badischen Hofmalers Feodor Iwanowitsch Kalmück (1763-1832), Unpublished Ph.D thesis, University of Karlsruhe, 1973 (copy in P&D library, gift of the author)
- Johann Georg Meusel: Teutsches Künstlerlexikon, 2nd edition, Volume 1, Lemgo 1808, pp. 227–230 (digitized version).
- Alfred Woltmann: Feodor Iwanowitsch, in Badische Biographien, Part one, Heidelberg 1875 online
- Joseph August Beringer: Fedor Iwanowitsch. In: Thieme-Becker. Founded by Ulrich Thieme and Felix Becker. Erman-Fiorenzo. EA Seemann, Leipzig 1915, p. 337–338 (Textarchiv – Internet Archive).
- Margrit-Elisabeth Velte: Leben und Werk des Badischen Hofmalers Fedor Iwanowitsch Kalmück (1763–1832), Dissertation Karlsruhe 1973.
- Johannes Werner: Der Kalmück. Das Leben des badischen Hofmalers Feodor Iwanowitsch. Verlag Regionalkultur, Ubstadt-Weiher/Heidelberg/Neustadt a.d.W./Basel 2016, ISBN 978-3-89735-943-7.
- Petra Reategui: Hofmaler. Das gestohlene Leben des Feodor Ivannoff genannt Kalmück. Triglyph Verlag, Bad Saulgau 2017, ISBN 978-3-944258-07-2.
