= Kalmyks =

Oirat Mongols in Europe

Хальмгуд Khalmgud ᡍᠠᠯᡅᡏᠠᡎᡇᡉᡑ
- Flag of Kalmykia, one of the republics of Russia

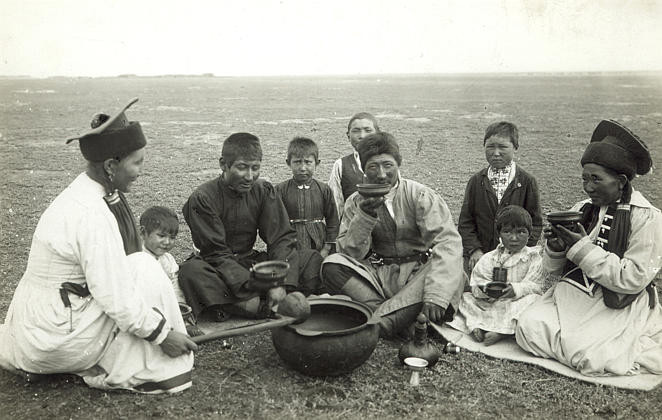
- Kalmyks in the late 19th century. Picture taken in the Salsky Raion of the Don Host Oblast

Total population
- c. 195,000

Regions with significant populations
- Kalmykia (Russia)
- Russia: 179,547
- Kyrgyzstan: 12,000
- Ukraine: 325
- United States: 3,000
- Mongolia: 2,750

Languages
- Predominantly Kalmyk Oirat and Russian; American English (in the United States); Mongolian Oirat

Religion
- Predominantly Tibetan Buddhist sect of Vajrayana Buddhism; Minority Russian Orthodox Christianity, Tengrism, Mongolian shamanism, Islam

Related ethnic groups
- Mongols, especially Oirats

Kalmyks (Note: Kalmyk: Хальмгуд, romanized: Khalmgud, pronounced [xälʲməkút]; Mongolian: Халимагууд, romanized: Khalimaguud, pronounced [χɛɮʲmʊʁʊ́t]; Russian: Калмыки, romanized: Kalmyki, pronounced [kɐɫˈmɨkʲɪ]; Kyrgyz: Калмактар, romanized: Kalmaktar, pronounced [qɑɫmɑχtʰɑ́r]) (/ˌkæl.ˈmiːks, ˌkɑːl.-/), archaically anglicised as Calmucks (/ˌkæl.ˈmʌks, ˌkɑːl.-/), are the only Mongolic people found in Europe, residing in the easternmost part of the European Plain.

The ancestors of Kalmyks were Oirats (Western Mongols) who migrated from their homeland in Dzungaria to Eastern Europe in early modern times, establishing the Kalmyk Khanate in the 17th century. The Kalmyks are primarily descended from the Torghut subgroup of Oirats, but also consist of smaller populations of Dörbets, Khoshuts and Dzungars. Later, a group that settled in the Don region among the Don Cossacks became known as the Buzavas. Up until today the Kalmyks have retained their distinguished sub-ethnic groups, being quite separated from their geographical neighbours in Russia and northeast Caucasus.

The Kalmyks are the only traditionally Buddhist ethnic group who are located inside Europe. Through emigration, small Kalmyk communities have been established in the United States, France, Germany, and the Czech Republic.

== Origins and history ==
=== Early history of the Oirats ===
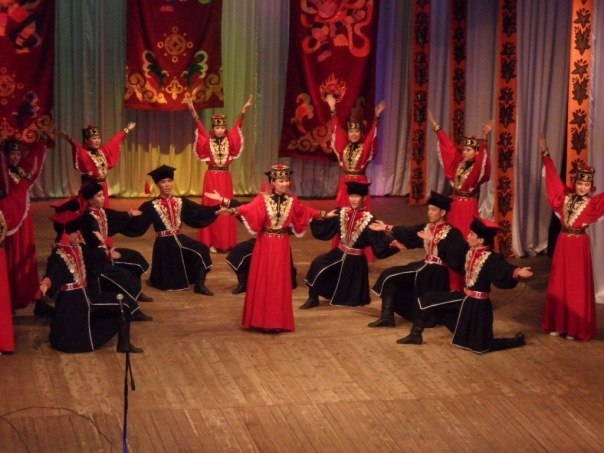
Kalmyks

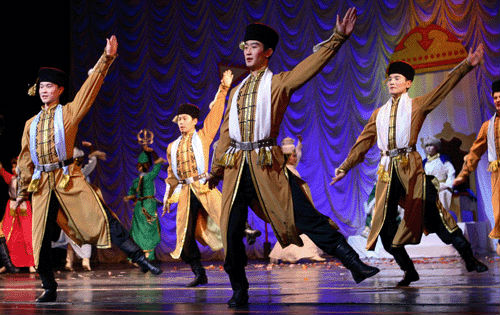
Kalmyk dancers

The contemporary Kalmyks are a branch of the Oirat Mongols, whose ancient grazing-lands spanned present-day parts of Kazakhstan, Russia, Mongolia and China. After the fall of the Mongol Yuan Dynasty in 1368, the Oirat-Mongols emerged as a formidable foe against the Khalkha Mongols, the Ming dynasty and the Qing dynasty. For 400 years, the Oirats conducted a military struggle for domination and control over both Inner Mongolia and Outer Mongolia. The struggle ended in 1757 with the defeat of the Oirats of the Dzungar Khanate against the Qing Empire, in the Dzungar–Qing Wars; they were the last of the Mongol groups to resist vassalage to Qing.

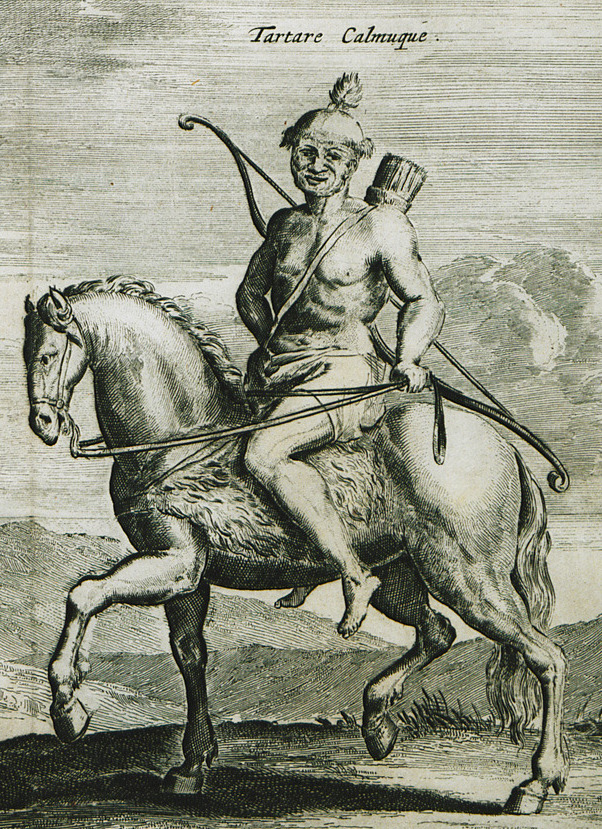
Kalmyk depicted by Jan Janszoon Struys (1681)

During the reigns of Esen Taishi (reigned 1438–1454) and Dayan Khan (reigned 1480-1517), all Mongols were united, and in the late 16th century, the Oirat-Mongols and Khalkha-Mongols made separate attempts to establish themselves, but in 1640, the Mongols declared the Mongol-Oirat Code (Mongolian: Их цааз); Kalmyks who had migrated to the Caspian Sea also participated as representatives. At the start of this 400-year era, the Western Mongols designated themselves as the Four Oirat. The alliance comprised four major Western Mongol tribes: Khoshut, Choros, Torghut and Dörbet. Collectively, the Four Oirat sought power as an alternative to the Mongols, who were the patrilineal heirs to Genghis Khan. The Four Oirat incorporated neighboring tribes or splinter groups at times, so there was a great deal of fluctuation in the composition of the alliance, with larger tribes dominating or absorbing the smaller ones. Smaller tribes belonging to the confederation included the Khoits, Zakhchin, Bayids and Khangal.

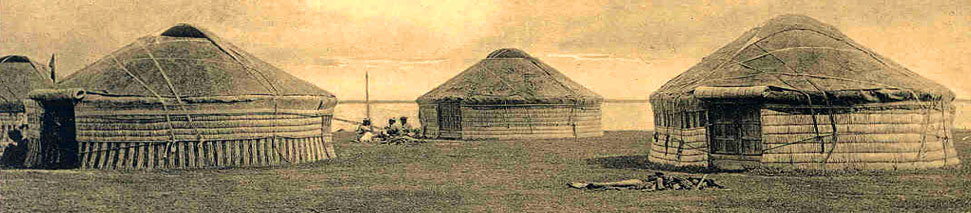
A traditional Kalmyk encampment. The Kalmyk yurt, called a gher, is a round, portable, self-supporting structure composed of lattice walls, rafters, roof ring, felt covering and tension bands.

Together, these nomadic tribes roamed the grassy plains of western Inner Asia, between Lake Balkhash in present-day eastern Kazakhstan and Lake Baikal in present-day Russia north of central Mongolia. They pitched their yurts and kept herds of cattle, flocks of sheep, horses, donkeys and camels.

Paul Pelliot translated the name "Torghut" as garde de jour. He wrote that the Torghuts owed their name either to the memory of the guard of Genghis Khan or, as descendants of the Keraites, to the old garde de jour. This was documented among the Keraites in The Secret History of the Mongols before Genghis Khan took over the region.

=== Period of open conflict ===
The Four Oirat was a political entity formed by the four major Oirat tribes. During the 15–17th centuries, they established under the name "10 tumen Mongols", a cavalry unit of 10,000 horsemen, including four Oirat tumen and six tumen composed of other Mongols. They reestablished their traditional pastoral nomadic lifestyle during the end of the Yuan dynasty. The Oirats formed this alliance to defend themselves against the Khalkha Mongols and to pursue the greater objective of reunifying Mongolia.

Until the mid-17th century, when bestowal of the title of Khan was transferred to the Dalai Lama, all Mongol tribes recognized this claim and the political prestige attached to it. Although the Oirats could not assert this claim prior to the mid-17th century, they did in fact have a close connection to Genghis Khan by virtue of the fact that Genghis Khan's brother, Qasar, was in command of the Khoshut tribe.

In response to the Western Mongols' self-designation as the Four Oirat, the Eastern Mongols began to refer to themselves as the "Forty Mongols", or the "Forty and Four". This means that the Khalkha Mongols claimed to have forty tümen to the four tümen maintained by the Four Oirat.

The Oirat alliance was decentralized, informal and unstable. For instance, the Four Oirat did not have a central location from which it was governed, and it was not governed by a central figure for most of its existence. The four Oirats did not establish a single military or a unified monastic system. Lastly, it was not until 1640 that the Four Oirat adopted uniform customary laws.

As pastoralist nomads, the Oirats were organized at the tribal level, where each tribe was ruled by a noyon or prince who also functioned as the chief taishi "chieftain". The chief taishi governed with the support of lesser noyons, who were also called taishi. These minor noyons controlled divisions of the tribe (ulus) and were politically and economically independent of the chief tayishi. Chief taishis sought to influence and dominate the chief taishis of the other tribes, causing intertribal rivalry, dissension and periodic skirmishes.

Under the leadership of Esen, Chief Taishi of the Choros, the Four Oirat unified Mongolia for a short period. After Esen's death in 1455, the political union of the Dörben Oirat dissolved quickly, resulting in two decades of Oirat-Eastern Mongol conflict. The deadlock ended during the reign of Batmunkh Dayan Khan, a five-year-old boy in whose name the loyal Eastern Mongol forces rallied. Mandukhai Khatun and Dayan Khan took advantage of Oirat disunity and weakness and brought Oirats back under Mongolian rule. In doing so, he regained control of the Mongol homeland and restored the hegemony of the Eastern Mongols.

After the death of Dayan in 1543, the Oirats and the Khalkhas resumed their conflict. The Oirat forces thrust eastward, but Dayan's youngest son, Geresenz, was given command of the Khalkha forces and drove the Oirats to Uvs Lake in northwest Mongolia. In 1552, after the Oirats once again challenged the Khalkha, Altan Khan swept up from Inner Mongolia with Tümed and Ordos cavalry units, pushing elements of various Oirat tribes from Karakorum to the Khovd region in northwest Mongolia, reuniting most of Mongolia in the process.

The Oirats would later regroup south of the Altai Mountains in Dzungaria. But Geresenz's grandson, Sholoi Ubashi Khuntaiji, pushed the Oirats further northwest, along the steppes of the Ob and Irtysh Rivers. Afterwards, he established a Khalkha Khanate under the name, Altan Khan, in the Oirat heartland of Dzungaria.

In spite of the setbacks, the Oirats would continue their campaigns against the Altan Khanate, trying to unseat Sholoi Ubashi Khuntaiji from Dzungaria. The continuous, back-and-forth nature of the struggle, which defined this period, is captured in the Oirat epic song "The Rout of Mongolian Sholoi Ubashi Khuntaiji", recounting the Oirat victory over the Altan Khan of the Khalkha in 1587.

=== Resurgence of Oirat power ===
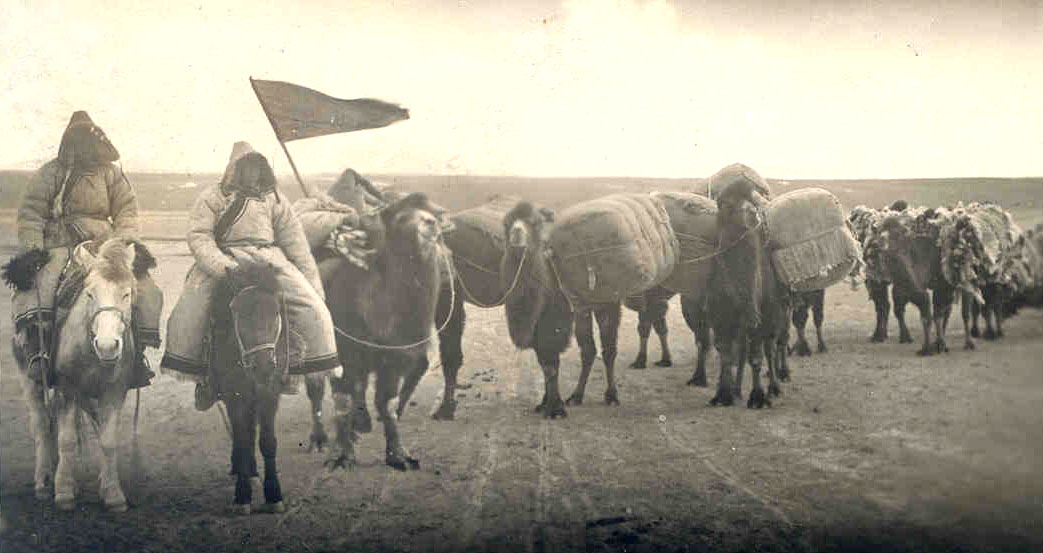
An image of an early 20th-century Oirat caravan, taken in either China or Mongolia, traveling on horseback, possibly to trade goods

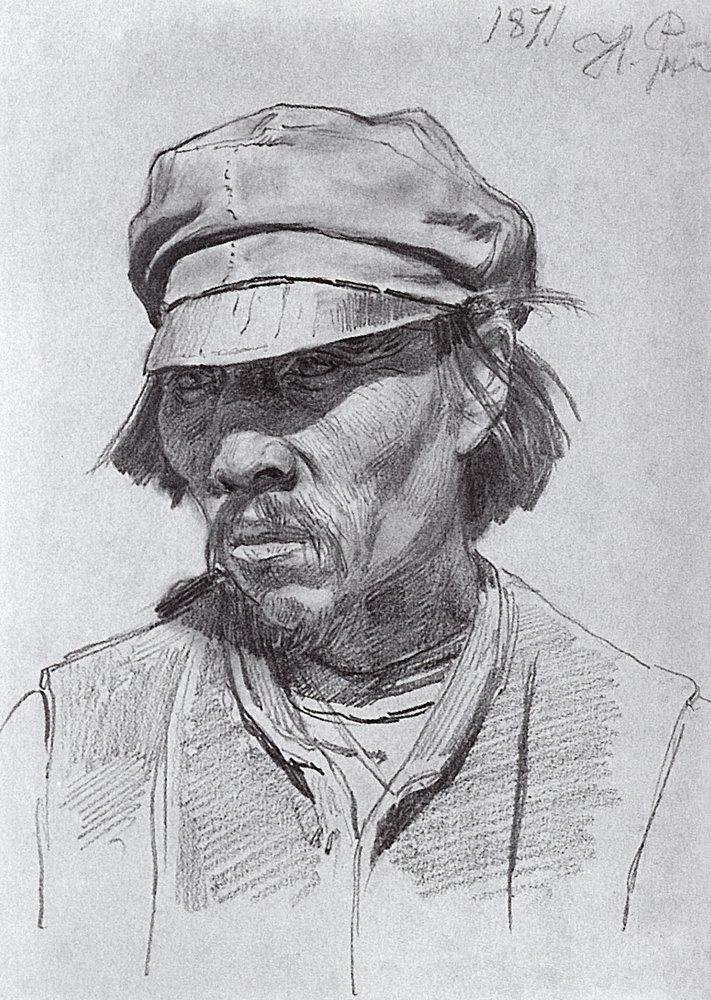
Portrait of a Kalmyk man

At the beginning of the 17th century, the First Altan Khan drove the Oirats westward to present-day eastern Kazakhstan. The Torghuts became the westernmost Oirat tribe, encamped in the Tarbagatai Mountains region and along the northern stretches of the Irtysh, Ishim and Tobol Rivers.

Further west, the Kazakhs prevented the Torghuts from sending its trading caravans to the Muslim towns and villages located along the Syr Darya river. As a result, the Torghuts established a trading relationship with the newly established outposts of the Tsarist government whose expansion into and exploration of Siberia was motivated mostly by the desire to profit from trade with Asia.

The Khoshut, by contrast, were the easternmost Oirat, encamped near the Lake Zaysan area and the Semey region along the lower portions of the Irtysh River, where they built several steppe monasteries. The Khoshut were adjacent to the Khalkha khanates of Altan Khan and Dzasagtu Khan. Both khanates prevented the Khoshut and the other Oirat from trading with Chinese border towns. The Khoshut were ruled by Baibagas Khan and then Güshi Khan, who were the first Oirat leaders to convert to the Gelug school of Tibetan Buddhism.

Locked in between both tribes were the Choros, Dörbet Oirat and Khoid, who confederated in the early 17th century as the Dzungar people. They were slowly rebuilding the base of power they enjoyed under the Four Oirat. The Choros were the dominant Oirat tribe of that era. Their leader, Erdeni Batur, attempted to follow Esen Khan in unifying the Oirats to challenge the Khalkha.

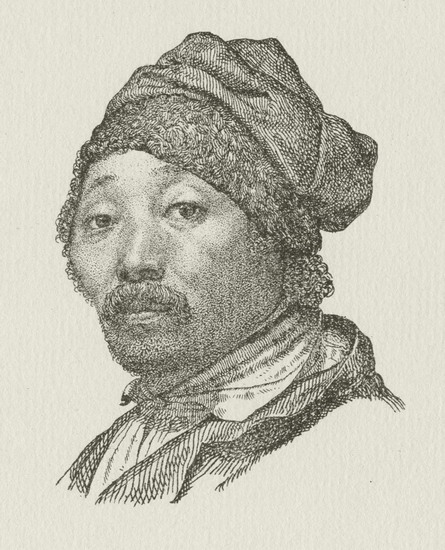
Portrait of Feodor Iwanowitsch Kalmyk (1763–1832), a painter-sculptor of Kalmyk origin

Under the dynamic leadership of Erdeni Batur, the Dzungars stopped the expansion of the first Altan Khan and began planning the resurrection of the Four Oirat under the Dzungar banner. In furtherance of such plans, Erdeni Batur designed and built a capital city called Kubak-sari on the Emil River near the modern city of Tacheng. During his attempt to build a nation, Erdeni Batur encouraged diplomacy, commerce and farming. He also sought to acquire modern weaponry and build small industry, such as metal works, to supply his military with weapons.

The attempted unification of the Oirat caused dissension among the tribes and their Chief Tayishis who were independent minded but also highly regarded leaders themselves. This dissension reputedly caused Kho Orluk to move the Torghut tribe and elements of the Dörbet tribe westward to the Volga region where his descendants formed the Kalmyk Khanate. In the east, Güshi Khan took part of the Khoshut to the Tsaidam and Qinghai regions in the Tibetan Plateau, where he formed the Khoshut Khanate to protect Tibet and the Gelug from both internal and external enemies. Erdeni Batur and his descendants, by contrast, formed the Dzungar Khanate and came to dominate Central Eurasia.

=== Torghut migration ===
In 1618, the Torghut and a small contingent of Dörbet Oirats (200,000–250,000 people) chose to migrate from the upper Irtysh River region to the grazing pastures of the lower Volga region south of Saratov and north of the Caspian Sea on both banks of the Volga River. The Torghut were led by their taishi, Kho Orluk. They were the largest Oirat tribe to migrate, bringing along nearly the entire tribe. The second-largest group was the Dörbet Oirats under their taishi, Dalai Batur. Together they moved west through southern Siberia and the southern Ural Mountains, avoiding the more direct route that would have taken them through the heart of the territory of their enemy, the Kazakhs. En route, they raided Russian settlements and Kazakh and Bashkir encampments.

Many theories have been advanced to explain the reasons for the migration. One generally accepted theory is that there may have been discontent among the Oirat tribes, which arose from the attempt by Kharkhul, taishi of the Dzungars, to centralize political and military control over the tribes under his leadership. Some scholars, however, believe that the Torghuts sought uncontested pastures as their territory was being encroached upon by the Russians from the north, the Kazakhs from the south and the Dzungars from the east. The encroachments resulted in overcrowding of people and livestock, thereby diminishing the food supply. Lastly, a third theory suggests that the Torghuts grew weary of the militant struggle between the Oirats and the Altan Khanate.

=== Kalmyk Khanate ===
==== Period of self rule, 1630–1724 ====
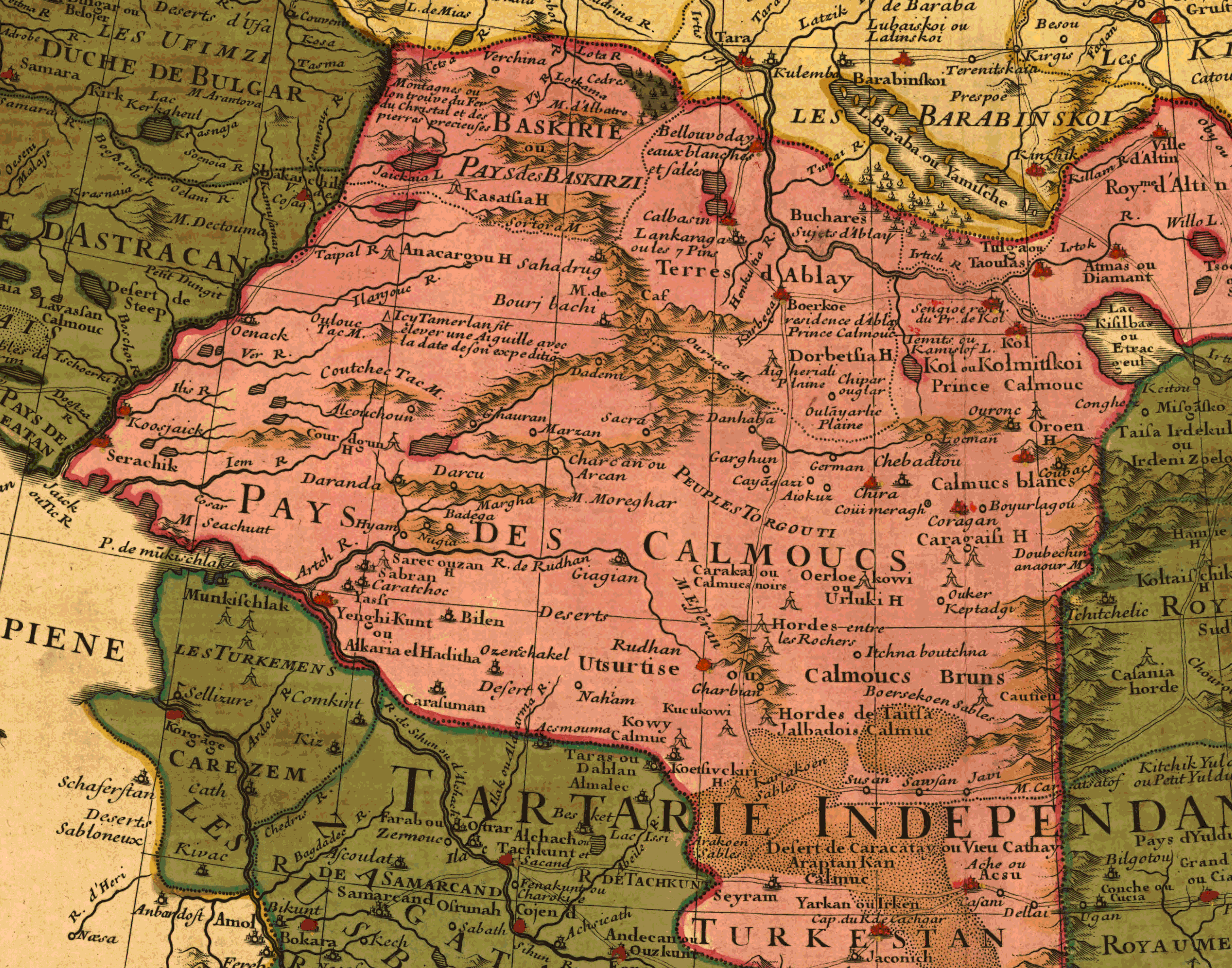
This map fragment shows part of the Dzungar Khanate, 1706 ("Carte de Tartarie" of Guillaume Delisle (1675–1726), Map Collection of the Library of Congress).

Upon arrival to the lower Volga region in 1630, the Oirats encamped on land that was once part of the Astrakhan Khanate but was now claimed by the Tsardom of Russia. The region was lightly populated, from south of Saratov to the Russian garrison at Astrakhan and on both the east and the west banks of the Volga River. The Tsardom of Russia was not ready to colonize the area and was in no position to prevent the Oirats from encamping in the region, but it had a direct political interest in ensuring that the Oirats would not become allied with its Turkic-speaking neighbors. The Kalmyks became Russian allies and a treaty to protect the southern Russian border was signed between the Kalmyk Khanate and Russia.

The Oirats quickly consolidated their position by expelling the majority of the native inhabitants, the Nogai Horde. Large groups of Nogais fled southeast to the northern Caucasian plain and west to the Black Sea steppe, lands claimed by the Crimean Khanate, itself a vassal or ally of the Ottoman Empire. Smaller groups of Nogais sought the protection of the Russian garrison at Astrakhan. The remaining nomadic tribes became vassals of the Oirats.

The Kalmyks battled the Karakalpaks. The Mangyshlak Peninsula was overtaken in 1639 by Kalmyks.

At first, an uneasy relationship existed between the Russians and the Oirats. Mutual raiding by the Oirats of Russian settlements and by the Cossacks and the Bashkirs, Muslim vassals of the Russians, of Oirat encampments was commonplace. Numerous oaths and treaties were signed to ensure Oirat loyalty and military assistance. Although the Oirats became subjects of the Tsar, such allegiance by the Oirats was deemed to be nominal.

In reality, the Oirats governed themselves pursuant to a document known as the "Great Code of the Nomads" (Iki Tsaadzhin Bichig). The Code was promulgated in 1640 by them, their brethren in Dzungaria and some of the Khalkha who all gathered near the Tarbagatai Mountains in Dzungaria to resolve their differences and to unite under the banner of the Gelug school. Although the goal of unification was not met, the summit leaders did ratify the Code, which regulated all aspects of nomadic life.

In securing their position, the Oirats became a borderland power, often allying themselves with the Russian Empire against the neighboring Muslim population. During the era of Ayuka Khan, the Oirats rose to political and military prominence as the Russian Empire sought the increased use of Oirat cavalry in support of its military campaigns against the Muslim powers in the south, such as Safavid Iran, the Ottoman Empire, the Nogais, the Tatars of Kuban and the Crimean Khanate. Ayuka Khan also waged wars against the Kazakhs, subjugated the Turkmens of the Mangyshlak Peninsula, and made multiple expeditions against the highlanders of the North Caucasus. These campaigns highlighted the strategic importance of the Kalmyk Khanate which functioned as a buffer zone, separating Russia and the Muslim world, as Russia fought wars in Europe to establish itself as a European power.

To encourage the release of Oirat cavalrymen in support of its military campaigns, the Russian Empire increasingly relied on the provision of monetary payments and dry goods to the Oirat Khan and the Oirat nobility. In that respect, the Russian Empire treated the Oirats as it did the Cossacks. The provision of monetary payments and dry goods, however, did not stop the mutual raiding, and, in some instances, both sides failed to fulfill its promises.

Another significant incentive the Russian Empire provided to the Oirats was tariff-free access to the markets of Russian border towns, where the Oirats were permitted to barter their herds and the items they obtained from Asia and their Muslim neighbors in exchange for Russian goods. Trade also occurred with neighboring Turkic tribes under Russian control, such as the Tatars and the Bashkirs. Intermarriage became common with such tribes. This trading arrangement provided substantial benefits, monetary and otherwise, to the Oirat tayishis, noyons and zaisangs.

Fred Adelman described this era as the "Frontier Period", lasting from the advent of the Torghut under Kho Orluk in 1630 to the end of the great khanate of Kho Orluk's descendant, Ayuka Khan, in 1724, a phase accompanied by little discernible acculturative change:

There were few sustained interrelations between Kalmyks and Russians in the frontier period. Routine contacts consisted in the main of seasonal commodity exchanges of Kalmyk livestock and the products thereof for such nomad necessities as brick tea, grain, textiles and metal articles, at Astrakhan, Tsaritsyn and Saratov. This was the kind of exchange relationship between nomads and urban craftsmen and traders in which the Kalmyks traditionally engaged. Political contacts consisted of a series of treaty arrangements for the nominal allegiance of the Kalmyk Khans to Russia, and the cessation of mutual raiding by Kalmyks on the one hand and Cossacks and Bashkirs on the other. A few Kalmyk nobles became russified and nominally Christian who went to Moscow in hope of securing Russian help for their political ambitions on the Kalmyk steppe. Russian subsidies to Kalmyk nobles, however, became an effective means of political control only later. Yet gradually the Kalmyk princes came to require Russian support and to abide in Russian policy.

— Adelman, 1960:14–15

During the era of Ayuka Khan, the Kalmyk Khanate reached its peak of military and political power. The Khanate experienced economic prosperity from free trade with Russian border towns, China, Tibet and with their Muslim neighbors. During this era, Ayuka Khan also kept close contacts with his Oirat kinsmen in Dzungaria, as well as the Dalai Lama in Tibet.

==== From Oirat to Kalmyk ====
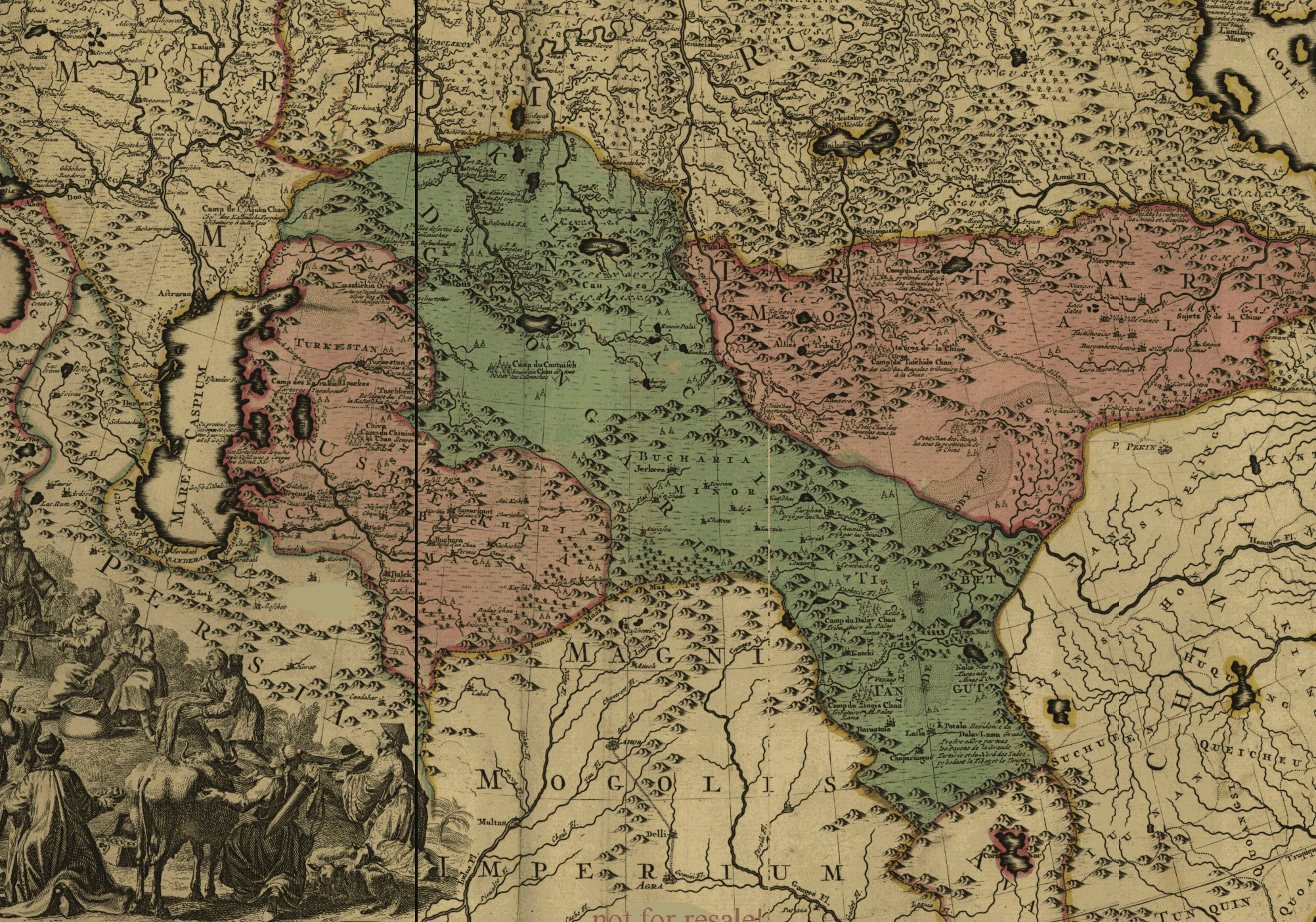
Map of the Russian Empire created in 1720–1725; this fragment shows Dzungar Empire (highlighted in green), which is referred to by Western scholars as Dzungarian Khanate.

Historically, Oirat identified themselves by their respective sub-group names. In the 15th century, the three major groups of Oirat formed an alliance, adopting "Dörben Oirat" as their collective name. In the early 17th century, a second great Oirat Confederation emerged, which later became the Dzungar Empire. While the Dzungars (initially Choros, Dörbet and Khoit tribes) were establishing their empire in Central Eurasia, the Khoshuts were establishing the Khoshut Khanate in Tibet, protecting the Gelugpa sect from its enemies, and the Torghuts formed the Kalmyk Khanate in the lower Volga region.

After encamping, the Oirats began to identify themselves as "Kalmyk." This named was supposedly given to them by their Muslim neighbors and later used by the Russians to describe them. The Oirats used this name in their dealings with outsiders, viz., their Russian and Muslim neighbors. But they continued to refer to themselves by their tribal, clan, or other internal affiliations.

The name Kalmyk, however, wasn't immediately accepted by all of the Oirat tribes in the lower Volga region. As late as 1761, the Khoshut and Dzungars (refugees from the Manchu Empire) referred to themselves and the Torghuts exclusively as Oirats. The Torghuts, by contrast, used the name Kalmyk for themselves as well as the Khoshut and Dzungars.

Generally, European scholars have identified all western Mongolians collectively as Kalmyks, regardless of their location (Ramstedt, 1935: v–vi). Such scholars (e.g. Sebastian Muenster) have relied on Muslim sources who traditionally used the word "Kalmyk" to describe western Mongolians in a derogatory manner and the western Mongols of China and Mongolia have regarded that name as a term of abuse. Instead, they use the name Oirat or they go by their respective tribal names, e.g., Khoshut, Dörbet, Choros, Torghut, Khoit, Bayid, Mingat, etc.

Over time, the descendants of the Oirat migrants in the lower Volga region embraced the name "Kalmyk" irrespective of their locations, viz., Astrakhan, the Don Cossack region, Orenburg, Stavropol, the Terek and the Ural Mountains. Another generally accepted name is Ulan Zalata or the "red-buttoned ones".

==== Torghut exodus ====
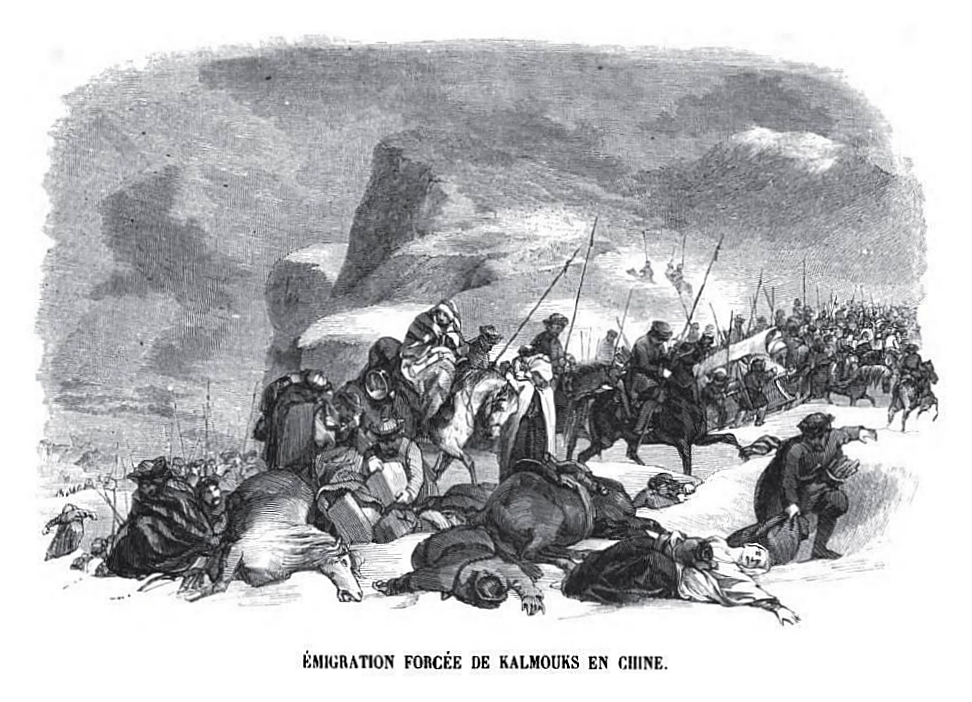
Kalmyk exodus to Dzungaria. Engraving by Charles Michel Geoffroy, 1845.

In January 1771 the oppression of Tsarist administration forced the larger part of Kalmyks (33 thousand households, or approximately 140,000–170,000 people) to migrate to Dzungaria. Ubashi Khan, the great-grandson of Ayuka Khan and the last Kalmyk Khan, decided to return his people to their ancestral homeland, Dzungaria, and restore the Dzungar Khanate and Mongolian independence. As C.D Barkman notes, "It is quite clear that the Torghuts had not intended to surrender the Chinese, but had hoped to lead an independent existence in Dzungaria."

Ubashi sent 30,000 cavalry in the first year of the Russo-Turkish War (1768–74) to gain weaponry before the migration. The 8th Dalai Lama was contacted to request his blessing and to set the date of departure. After consulting the astrological chart, he set a return date, but at the moment of departure, the weakening of the ice on the Volga River permitted only those Kalmyks (about 170,000 people) on the eastern bank to leave. Those 100,000–150,000 people on the western bank were forced to stay behind and Catherine the Great executed influential nobles from among them.

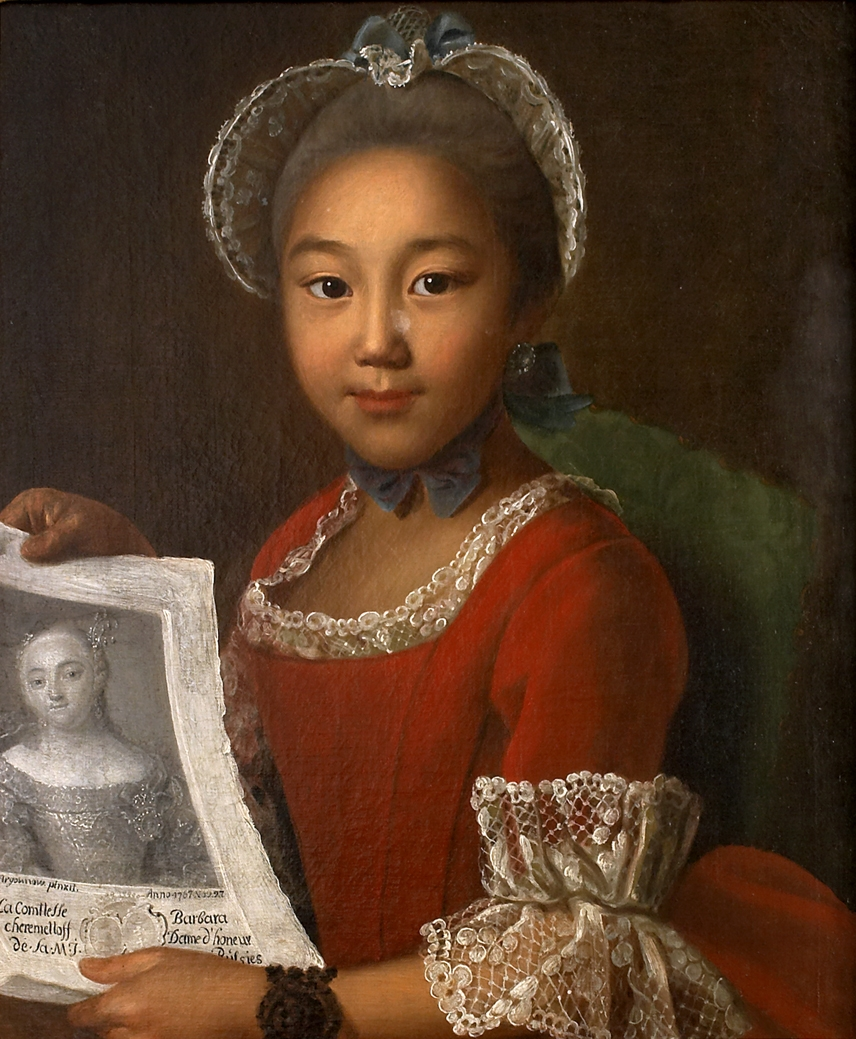
Portrait of Kalmyk girl Annushka, by Russian painter Ivan Argunov, 1767

Approximately five-sixths of the Torghut followed Ubashi Khan. Most of the Khoshut, Choros, and Khoid also accompanied the Torghut on their journey to Dzungaria. The Dörbet Oirat, in contrast, elected not to go at all.

Catherine the Great ordered the Russian army, the Bashkirs, and the Kazakhs to stop all the migrants. Suffering from thirst, hunger, and raids by Kazakhs and Kyrgyz, about 85,000 Kalmyks perished on the way to Dzungaria. After failing to stop the flight, Catherine abolished the Kalmyk Khanate, transferring all governmental powers to the governor of Astrakhan. The title of Khan was abolished. The highest native governing office remaining was the Vice-Khan, who also was recognized by the government as the highest ranking Kalmyk prince. By appointing the Vice-Khan, the Russian Empire was now permanently the decisive force in Kalmyk government and affairs.

After seven months of travel, only one-third (66,073) of the original group reached Balkhash Lake, the western border of Qing China. This migration became the topic of The Revolt of the Tartars, by Thomas De Quincey.

The Qing shifted the Kalmyks to five different areas to prevent their revolt and influential leaders of the Kalmyks soon died. The migrant Kalmyks became known as Torghut in Qing China. The Torghut were coerced by the Qing into giving up their nomadic lifestyle and to take up sedentary agriculture instead as part of a deliberate policy by the Qing to enfeeble them.

=== Life in the Russian Empire ===
After the 1771 exodus, the Kalmyks that remained part of the Russian Empire continued their nomadic pastoral lifestyle, ranging the pastures between the Don and the Volga Rivers, wintering in the lowlands along the shores of the Caspian Sea as far as Sarpa Lake to the northwest and Lake Manych-Gudilo to the west. In the spring, they moved along the Don River and the Sarpa lake system, attaining the higher grounds along the Don in the summer, passing the autumn in the Sarpa and Volga lowlands. In October and November they returned to their winter camps and pastures.

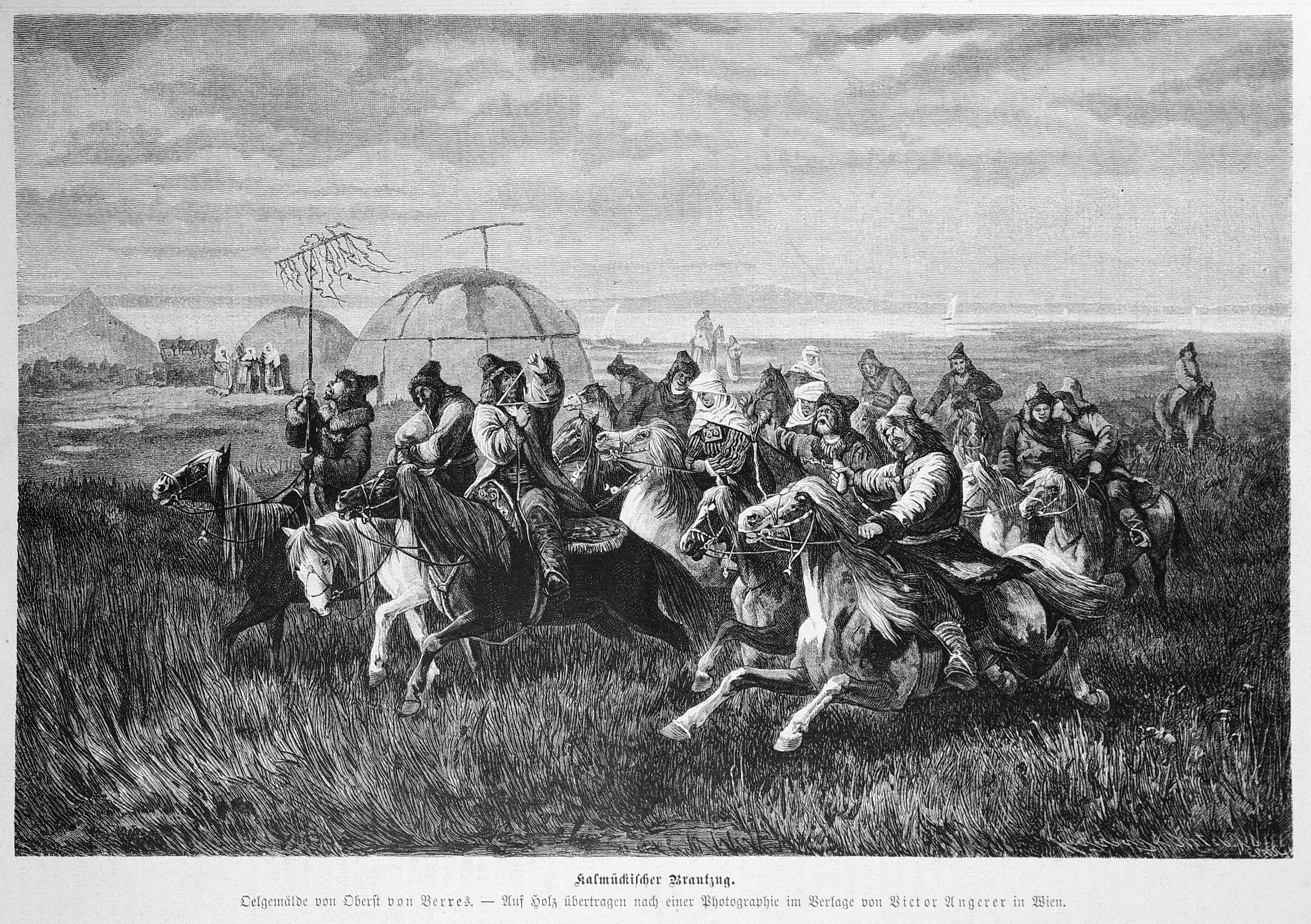
Kalmyk wedding procession, 1880

Despite their great loss in population, the Torghut still remained numerically superior, dominating the Kalmyks. The other Kalmyks in Russia included Dörbet Oirats and Khoshut. Elements of the Choros and Khoit also were present but were too few in number to retain their ulus (tribal division) as independent administrative units. As a result, they were absorbed by the ulus of the larger tribes.

The factors that caused the 1771 exodus continued to trouble the remaining Kalmyks. In the wake of the exodus, the Torghuts joined the Cossack rebellion of Yemelyan Pugachev in hopes that he would restore the independence of the Kalmyks. After Pugachev's Rebellion was defeated, Catherine the Great transferred the office of the Vice-Khan from the Torghut tribe to the Dörbet, whose princes supposedly remained loyal to the government during the rebellion. Thus, the Torghut were removed from their role as the hereditary leaders of the Kalmyk people. The Khoshut could not challenge this political arrangement due to their smaller population size.

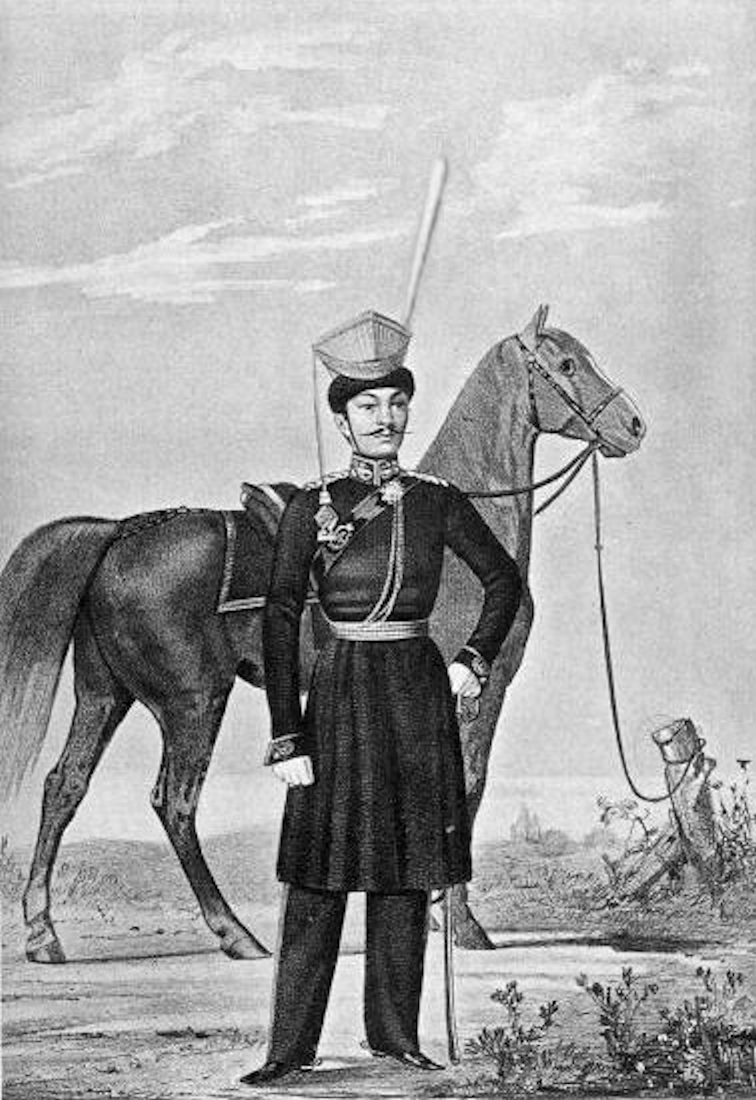
Kalmyk soldier of the Russian Army, 1812

The disruptions to Kalmyk society caused by the exodus and the Torghut participation in the Pugachev Rebellion precipitated a major realignment in Kalmyk tribal structure. The government divided the Kalmyks into three administrative units attached, according to their respective locations, to the district governments of Astrakhan, Stavropol and the Don and appointed a special Russian official bearing the title of "Guardian of the Kalmyk People" for purposes of administration. The government also resettled some small groups of Kalmyks along the Ural, Terek and Kuma rivers and in Siberia.

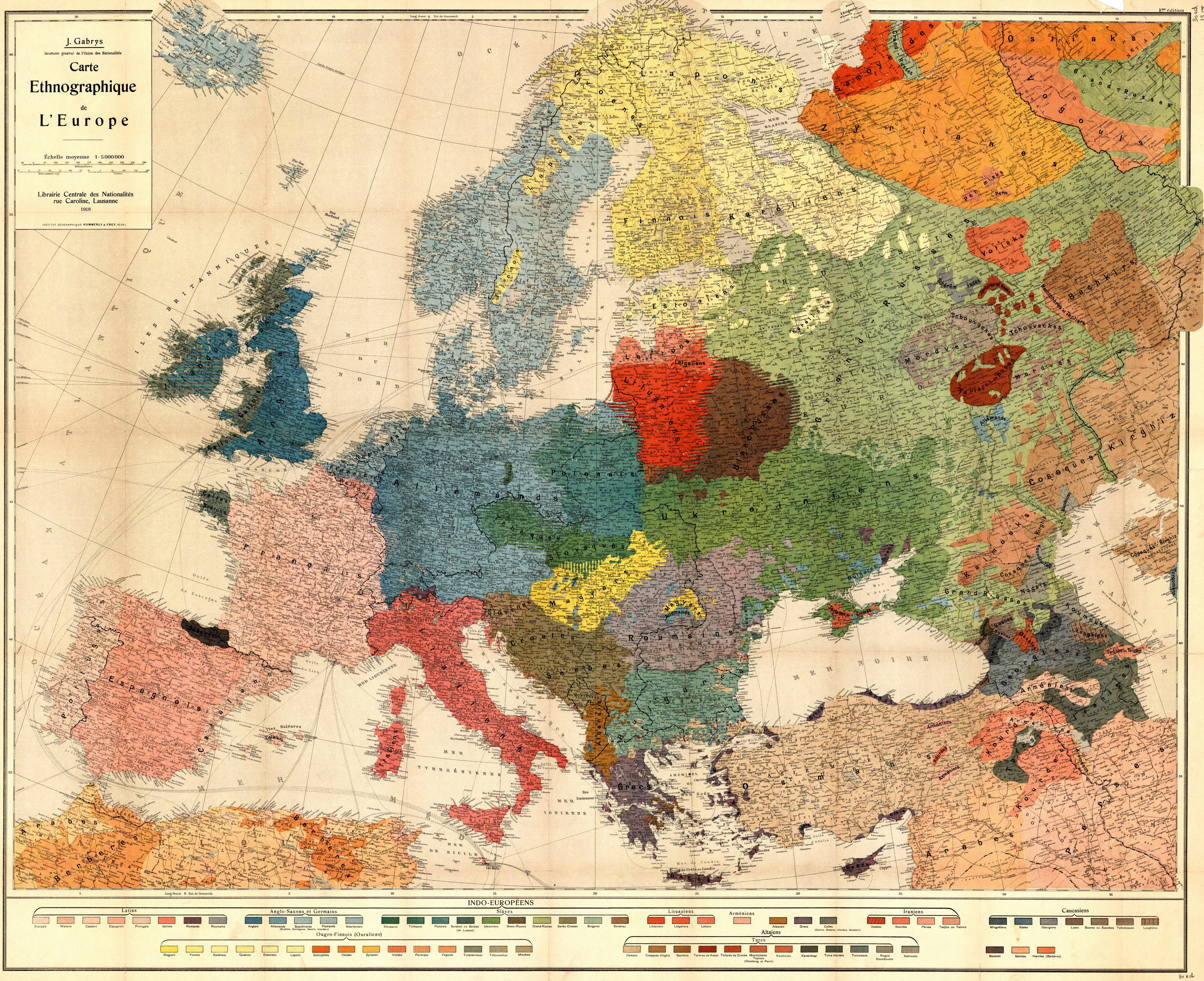
Map showing location of the Kalmyks in the 1910s

The redistricting divided the now dominant Dörbet tribe into three separate administrative units. Those in the western Kalmyk Steppe were attached to the Astrakhan district government. They were called Baga (Lesser) Dörbet. By contrast, the Dörbets who moved to the northern part of the Stavropol province were called Ike (Greater) Dörbet even though their population was smaller. Finally, the Kalmyks of the Don became known as Buzava. Although they were composed of elements of all the Kalmyk tribes, the Buzava claimed descent from the Torghut tribe. Their name is derived from two tributaries of the Don River: Busgai and Busuluk. In 1798, Tsar Paul I recognized the Don Kalmyks as Don Cossacks. As such, they received the same rights and benefits as their Russian counterparts in exchange for providing national military services. At the end of the Napoleonic Wars, Kalmyk cavalry units in Russian service entered Paris.

Over time, the Kalmyks gradually created fixed settlements with houses and temples, in place of transportable round felt yurts. In 1865, Elista, the future capital of the Kalmyk Autonomous Soviet Socialist Republic was founded. This process lasted until well after the October Revolution of 1917.

=== Russian Revolution and Civil War ===
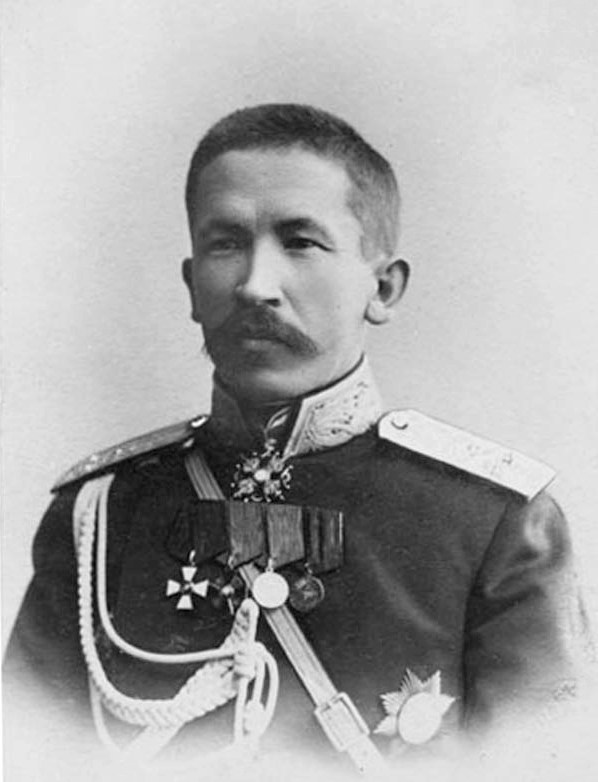
Lavr Kornilov, WWI general of the Imperial Russian Army and commander of the Volunteer Army during the Russian Civil War, was of mixed Kalmyk ancestry.

In the aftermath of the February Revolution, Kalmyk leaders believed that the Russian Provisional Government, which replaced the Tsarist government, would allow greater autonomy and freedom with respect to their culture, religion and economy. This enthusiasm, however, would soon dissolve after the Bolsheviks took control of the national government during the second revolution in November 1917.

After the Bolsheviks took control, various political and ethnic groups opposed to Communism organized in a loose political and military coalition known as the White movement. A volunteer "White Army" was raised to fight the Red Army, the military arm of the Bolshevik government. Initially, this army was composed primarily of volunteers and Tsarist supporters but were later joined by the Cossacks, including Don Kalmyks, many of whom resisted the Bolshevik policy of decossackization.

The second revolution split the Kalmyk people into opposing camps. Many were dissatisfied with the Tsarist government for its historic role in promoting the colonization of the Kalmyk steppe and in encouraging the russification of the Kalmyk people. But others also felt hostility towards Bolshevism for two reasons: (1) the loyalty of the Kalmyk people to their traditional leaders (i.e., nobility and clergy) – sources of anti-Communism – was deeply ingrained; and (2) the Bolshevik exploitation of the conflict between the Kalmyks and the local Russian peasants who seized Kalmyk land and livestock.

The Astrakhan Kalmyk nobility, led by Prince Danzan Tundutov of the Baga Dörbets and Prince Sereb-Djab Tiumen of the Khoshuts, expressed their anti-Bolshevik sentiments by seeking to integrate the Astrakhan Kalmyks into the military units of the Astrakhan Cossacks. But before a general mobilization of Kalmyk horsemen could occur, the Red Army seized power in Astrakhan and in the Kalmyk steppe thereby preventing the mobilization from occurring.

After the capture of Astrakhan, the Bolsheviks engaged in savage reprisals against the Kalmyk people, especially against Buddhist temples and the Buddhist clergy. Eventually the Bolsheviks would draft as many as 18,000 Kalmyk horsemen in the Red Army to prevent them from joining the White Army. This objective, however, failed to prevent many Red Army Kalmyk horsemen from defecting to the White side.

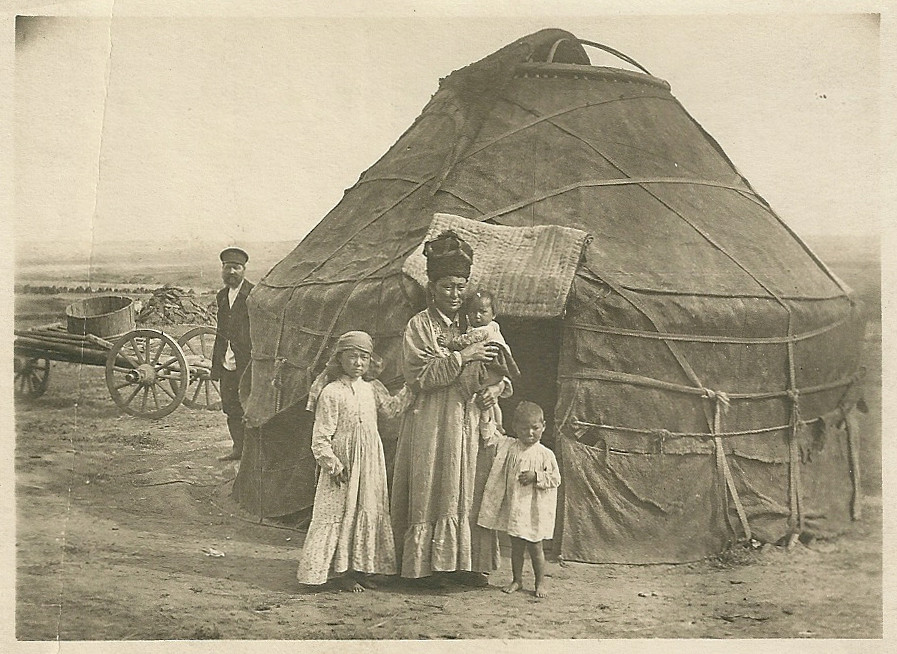
Kalmyk people in 1917

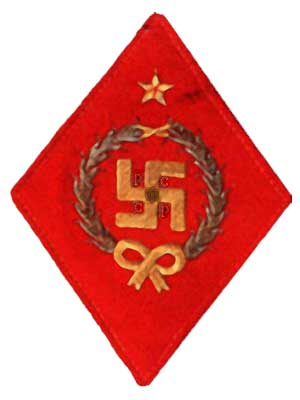
Russian Red Army South-East front: swastika emblem of the Kalmyk units. Founded on 3 Nov. 1919.

The majority of the Don Kalmyks also sided with the White Movement to preserve their Cossack lifestyle and proud traditions. As Don Cossacks, the Don Kalmyks first fought under White army General Anton Denikin and then under his successor, General Pyotr Nikolayevich Wrangel. Because the Don Cossack Host to which they belonged was the main center of the White Movement and of Cossack resistance, the battles were fought on Cossack lands and were disastrous for the Don Cossacks as villages and entire regions changed hands repeatedly in a fratricidal conflict in which both sides committed terrible atrocities. The Don Cossacks, including the Don Kalmyks, experienced heavy military and civilian losses, either from the fighting itself or from starvation and disease induced by the war. Some argue that the Bolsheviks were guilty of the mass extermination of the Don Cossack people, killing an estimated 70 percent (or 700,000 persons) of the Don Cossack population.

By October 1920, the Red Army smashed General Wrangel's resistance in the Crimea, forcing the evacuation of some 150,000 White army soldiers and their families to Constantinople, Turkey. A small group of Don Kalmyks managed to escape on the British and French vessels. The chaos at the Russian port city of Novorossiysk was described by Major H.N.H. Williamson of the British Military Mission to the Don Cossacks as follows:

We could still hear scattered rifle fire and the sound of naval guns, and the Bolshevik sympathisers were sniping from the rooftops. In places Red infantry had infiltrated into the town, and were going in for murder, rape and every kind of bestiality, while explosions rocked the towns as Whites set fire to petrol tanks, and the wind blew an immense pall of smoke across the bay. The waterfront was black with people, begging to be allowed on board the ships. Some of the Kalmuk Cossacks still had their horses and the little tented carts in which they had travelled, and in the water all sorts of rubbish floated – trunks, clothes, furniture, even corpses. Conditions were appalling. The refugees were still starving and the sick and the dead lay where they had collapsed. Masses of them had even tried to rush the evacuation office and the British troops had had to disperse then at bayonet point. Women were offering jewels, everything they possessed – even themselves – for the chance of a passage. But they hadn't a ghost of chance. The rule was only White troops, their dependents and the families of men who had worked with the British were allowed on board.

From there, this group resettled in Europe, primarily in Belgrade (where they established the fourth Buddhist temple in Europe), Bulgaria, Czechoslovakia and France where its leaders remained active in the White movement. In 1922, several hundred Don Kalmyks returned home under a general amnesty. Some returnees, including Prince Dmitri Tundutov, were imprisoned and then executed soon after their return.

=== Formation of the Kalmyk Soviet Republic ===
The Soviet government established the Kalmyk Autonomous Oblast in November 1920. It was formed by merging the Stavropol Kalmyk settlements with a majority of the Astrakhan Kalmyks. A small number of Don Kalmyks (Buzava) from the Don Host migrated to this Oblast. The administrative center was Elista, a small village in the western part of the Oblast that was expanded in the 1920s to reflect its status as the capital of the Oblast.

In October 1935, the Kalmyk Autonomous Oblast was reorganized into the Kalmyk Autonomous Soviet Socialist Republic. The chief occupations of the Republic were cattle breeding, agriculture, including the growing of cotton and fishing. There was no industry.

Under Soviet Likbez efforts, the literacy rate in Kalmykia grew from 12 to 59 percent between 1926 and 1939, and continued to make up nearly half the autonomous republic's population in 1939.

=== Collectivization and revolts ===
On 22 January 1922, Mongolia proposed to migrate the Kalmyks during famine in Kalmykia but Russia refused; 71–72,000 Kalmyks died during the famine. The Kalmyks revolted against Russia in 1926, 1930 and 1942–1943. In March 1927, Soviet deported 20,000 Kalmyks to Siberia, tundra and Karelia. Soviet scientists attempted to convince the Kalmyks and Buryats that they were not Mongols during the 20th century under the demongolization policy.

=== World War II and exile ===
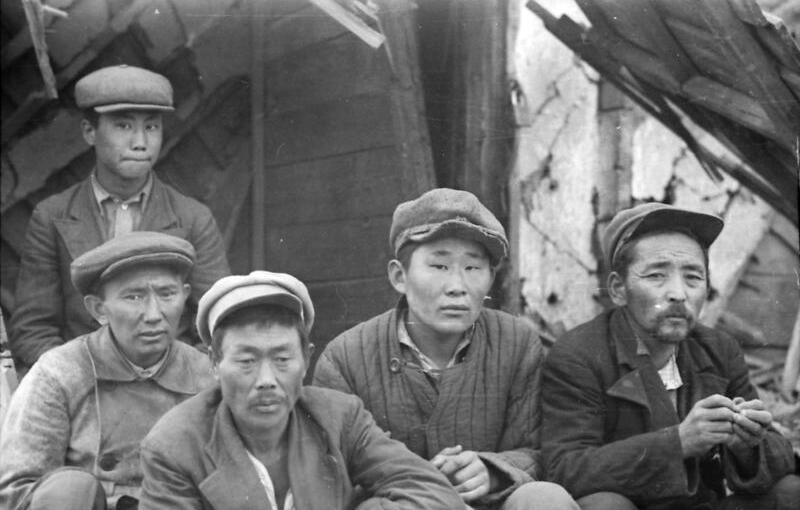
Kalmyk people in 1942

In June 1941 the German army invaded the Soviet Union, ultimately taking (some) control of the Kalmyk Autonomous Soviet Socialist Republic. In December 1942, however, the Red Army in their turn re-invaded the Republic. On 28 December 1943, the Soviet government accused the Kalmyks of collaborating with the Germans and deported the entire population, including Kalmyk Red Army soldiers, to various locations in Central Asia and Siberia. Within 24 hours the population transfer occurred at night during winter without notice in unheated cattle cars.

According to N. F. Bugai, the leading Russian expert on deportations, 4.9% of the Kalmyk population died during the first three months of 1944; 1.5% in the first three months of 1945; and 0.7% in the same period of 1946. From 1945 to 1950, 15,206 Kalmyks died and 7843 were born.

The Kalmyk Autonomous Soviet Socialist Republic was quickly dissolved. Its territory was divided and transferred to the adjacent regions, viz., the Astrakhan and Stalingrad Oblasts and Stavropol Krai. Since no Kalmyks lived there any longer the Soviet authorities changed the names of towns and villages from Kalmyk names to Russian names. For example, Elista became Stepnoi.

Around half of the 97,000–98,000 Kalmyks died in exile. The government of the Soviet Union forbade teaching Kalmyk Oirat during the deportation.

=== Return from Siberian exile ===
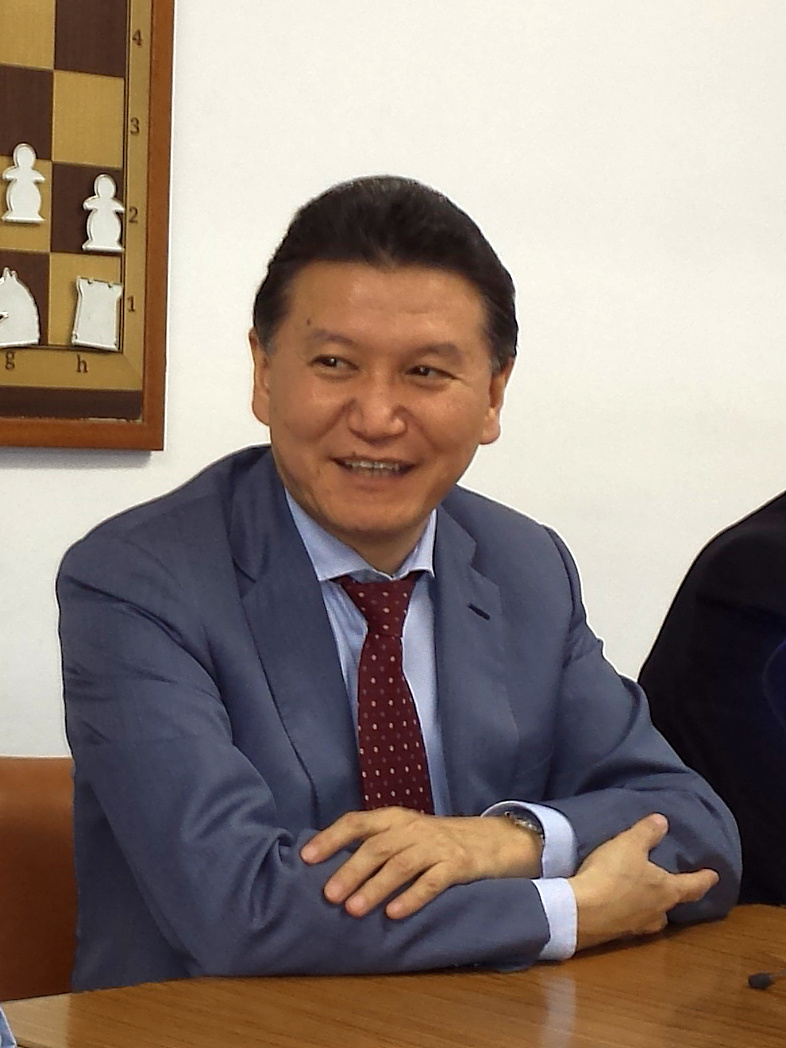
Former President of the World Chess Federation, Kirsan Ilyumzhinov

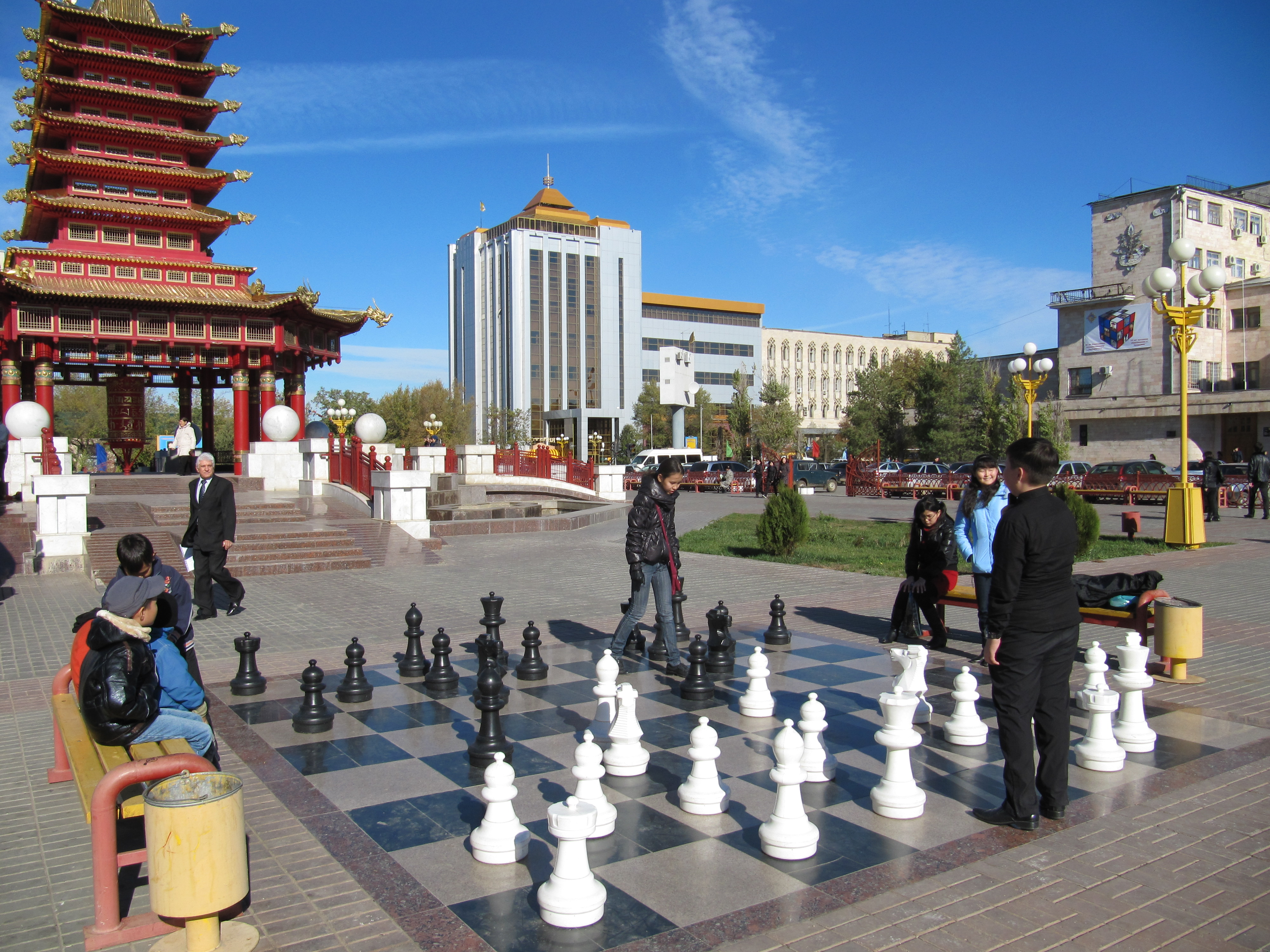
Giant street chess in Elista, the capital of Kalmykia

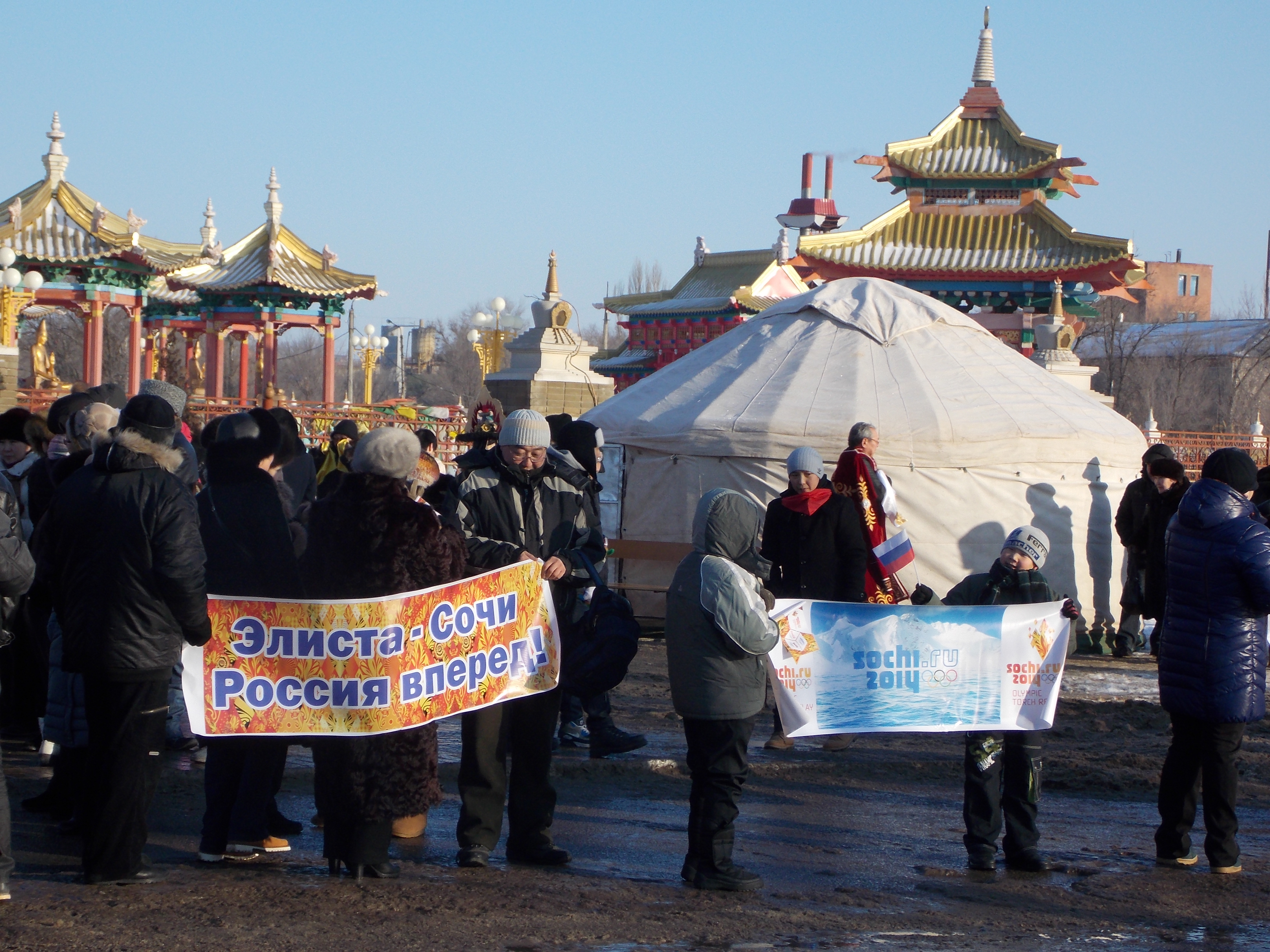
People in Elista

In 1957, Soviet Premier Nikita Khrushchev permitted the Kalmyk people to return to their home. Upon return, however, the Kalmyks found their homeland had become settled by Russians and Ukrainians, many of whom chose to remain. On January 9, 1957, Kalmykia once again became an autonomous oblast, and on 29 July 1958, an autonomous republic within the Russian Soviet Federative Socialist Republic.

In the following years bad planning of agricultural and irrigation projects resulted in widespread desertification. In addition, industrial plants were constructed without an analysis of the economic viability of such plants.

Under the Law of the Russian Federation of April 26, 1991, "On Rehabilitation of Exiled Peoples", repressions against Kalmyks and other peoples were qualified as an act of genocide.

In 1992, after the dissolution of the Soviet Union, Kalmykia chose to remain an autonomous republic of the successor government, the Russian Federation. The dissolution, however, facilitated the collapse of the economy at both the national and the local level, causing widespread economic and social hardship. The resulting upheaval caused many young Kalmyks to leave Kalmykia, especially in the rural areas, for economic opportunities in and outside the Russian Federation.

The local Supreme Soviet decided in 1992 to change the name of the republic to Khalmg Tangch. In June 1993, the Kalmyk authorities laid claim to the 3,900 square kilometres (1,500 sq mi) of the Volga delta that were not returned to Kalmyks when the Kalmyk ASSR was recreated in 1957. The Kalmyk authorities claimed that under the terms of the 1991 law On the Rehabilitation of Repressed Peoples, the lands, currently in the Astrakhan Oblast and Dagestan, would formally belong to Kalmykia with effect from July 1, 1993. The long-standing dispute over the delineation of Kalmykia's borders with Astrakhan oblast and Dagestan resurfaced in 2005, but no border changes were made.

The Kalmyks' ability to maintain a mostly homogeneous existence contrasts with the Russian admixture with other similar people, "as there is evidence for Russian admixture with Yakuts," for example. Thus far, genetic analysis of the Kalmyks supports their Mongol roots that also shows that entire families of Kalmyks moved to the Volga region and not simply males as is generally the case with most nomadic tribal groups:

The genetic results support the historical record in that they indicate a close relationship between Kalmyks and Mongolians. Moreover, the genetic results indicate that the Kalmyk migration involved substantial numbers of individuals, and that Kalmyks have not experienced detectable admixture with Russians.

In modern times, Kalmykia has friendly diplomatic and cultural ties with Mongolia. In the context of the Russian invasion of Ukraine since 2022, the Kalmyks have been reported as one of Russia's ethnic minority groups suffering from a disproportionally large casualty rate among Russian forces.

== Etymology ==
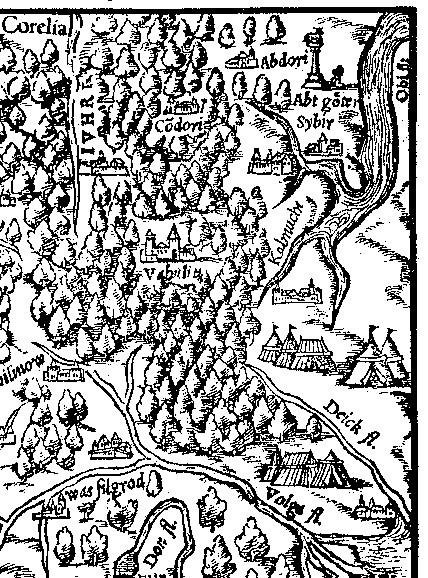
This map from Sebastian Muenster's Cosmographia is one of the earliest references to the name of the Kalmyks.

The name "Kalmyk" is a word of Turkic origin that means "remnant" or "to remain". Turkic tribes may have used this name as early as the thirteenth century. Arab geographer Ibn al-Wardi is documented as the first person to use the term in referring to the Oirats in the fourteenth century. The khojas of Kashgaria applied the name to Oirats in the fifteenth century. Russian written sources mentioned the name "Kolmak Tatars" as early as 1530, and cartographer Sebastian Muenster (1488–1552) circumscribed the territory of the "Kalmuchi" on a map in his Cosmographia, which was published in 1544. The Oirats themselves, however, did not accept the name as their own.

== Subgroups ==
There are these main ethnic subgroups of Kalmyks: Baatud, Dörbet, Khoid, Khoshut, Olot, Torghut and Buzava. The Torghuts and Dörbets are numerically dominant. The Buzava are a small minority and are considered to be the most russified Kalmyks.

== Demographics ==
Demographics of the Kalmyks in the Russian Empire, Soviet Union and Russian Federation
year	population
1897	190,648
1926	128,809
1939	129,786
1959	100,603
1970	131,318
1979	140,103
1989	165,103
2002	174,000
2010	183,372

== Location ==
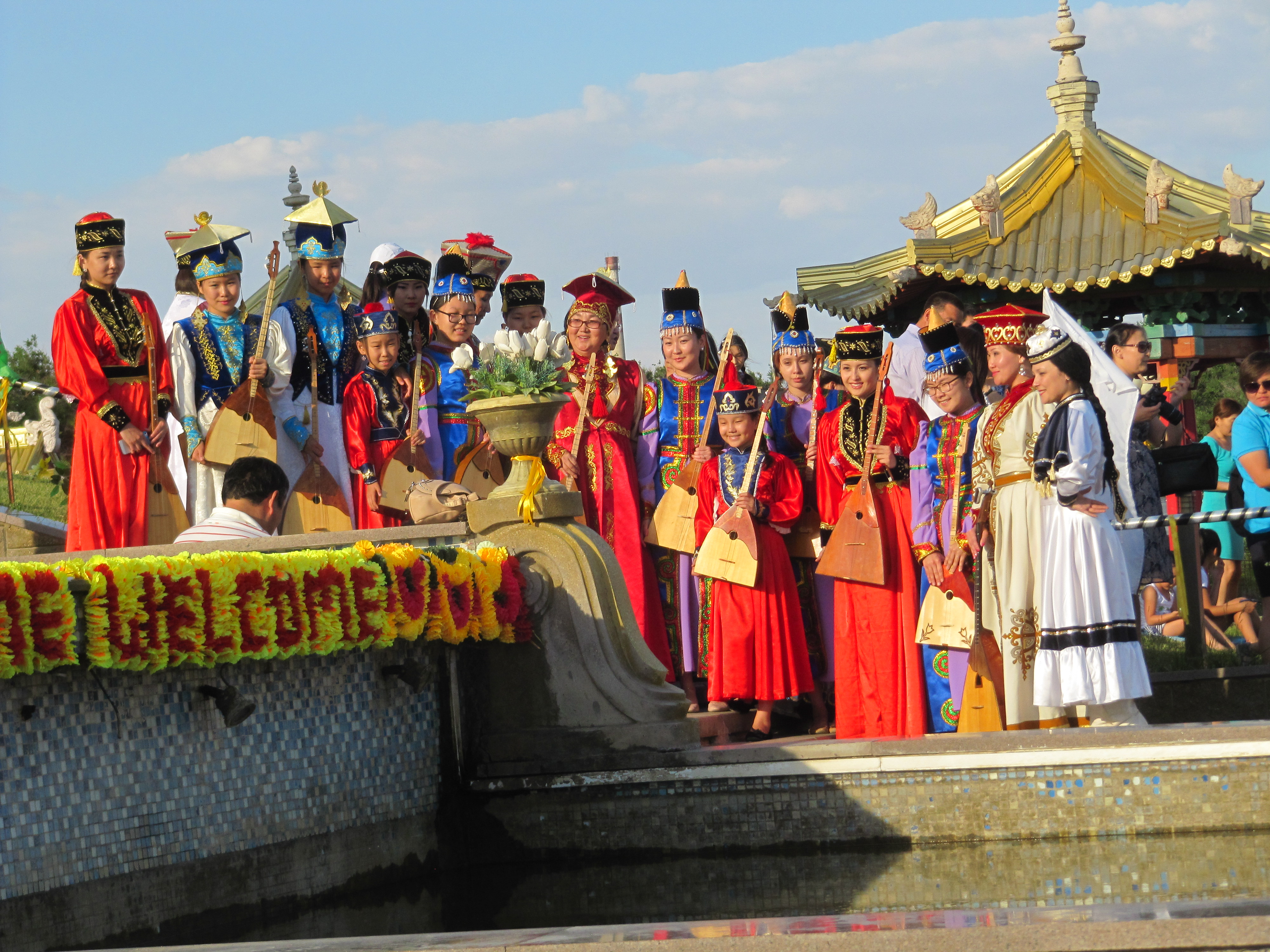
Kalmyks in Elista, Republic of Kalmykia

The Kalmyks live primarily in the Republic of Kalmykia, a federal subject of Russia. Kalmykia is located in the southeast European part of Russia, between the Volga and the Don rivers. It has borders with the Republic of Dagestan in the south; the Stavropol Krai in the southwest; and the Rostov Oblast and the Volgograd Oblast in the west and the northwest, respectively. Its eastern border is the Astrakhan Oblast. The southeast border is the Caspian Sea.

After the collapse of the Soviet Union, a large number of Kalmyks, primarily the young, moved from Kalmykia to larger cities in Russia, such as Moscow and St. Petersburg, and to the United States. The move was precipitated by the desire of these Kalmyks to pursue better educational and economic opportunities and continues today.

Currently, Kalmyks form a majority of the population in Kalmykia. According to the 2021 Russian census, there was a total of 159,138 Kalmyks who resided within Kalmykia. This represented 62.5% of the total population of the republic in 2021. In addition, Kalmyks have a much higher fertility rate than Russians and the other Slavic peoples, while the median age of the Kalmyk population is much lower than Russians. This ensures that the Kalmyk population will continue to grow for the foreseeable future.

== Religion ==
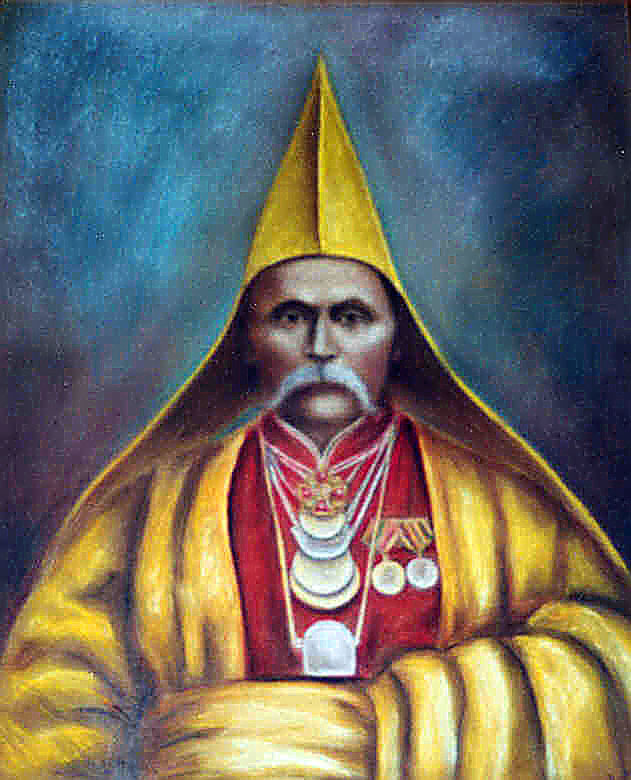
Portrait painting of Lama Mönke Bormanshinov wearing the traditional yellow hat by Alexander Burtschinow

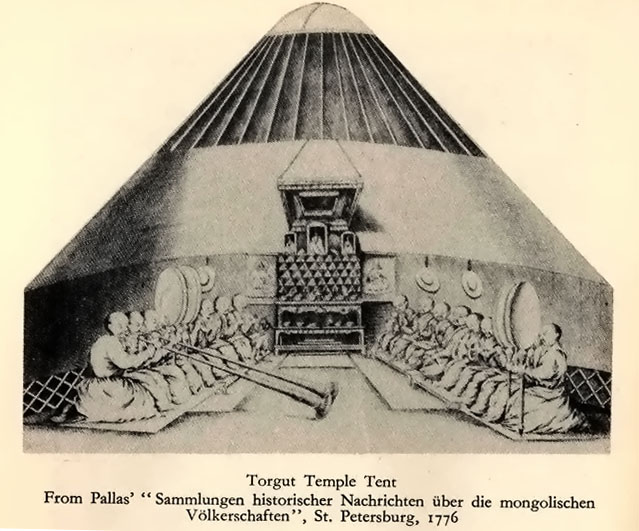
A drawing of the interior of a Torghut mobile monastery, 1776

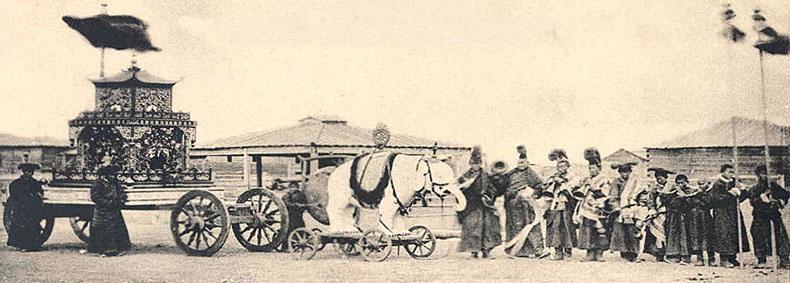
This is an example of a mobile khurul that was used by Tibetan Buddhists in Siberia at the start of the 20th century. The Kalmyks would have used a similar device prior to the 1840s.

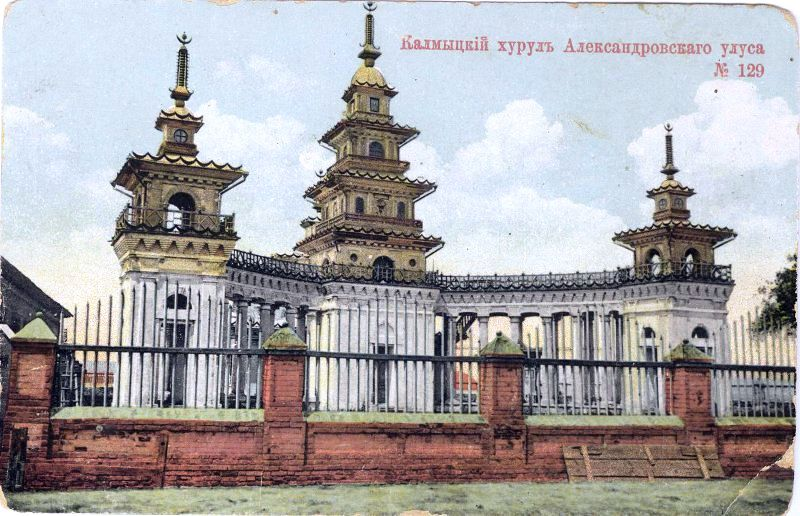
The Khosheutovsky khurul was built by Prince Tyumen of the Khoshut tribe to honor the participation of Kalmyk cavalry in the War of 1812. Under Soviet rule, the khurul was repurposed and partially deconstructed. After the fall of the USSR, the remaining part was restored and is now a designated cultural heritage site of federal significance.

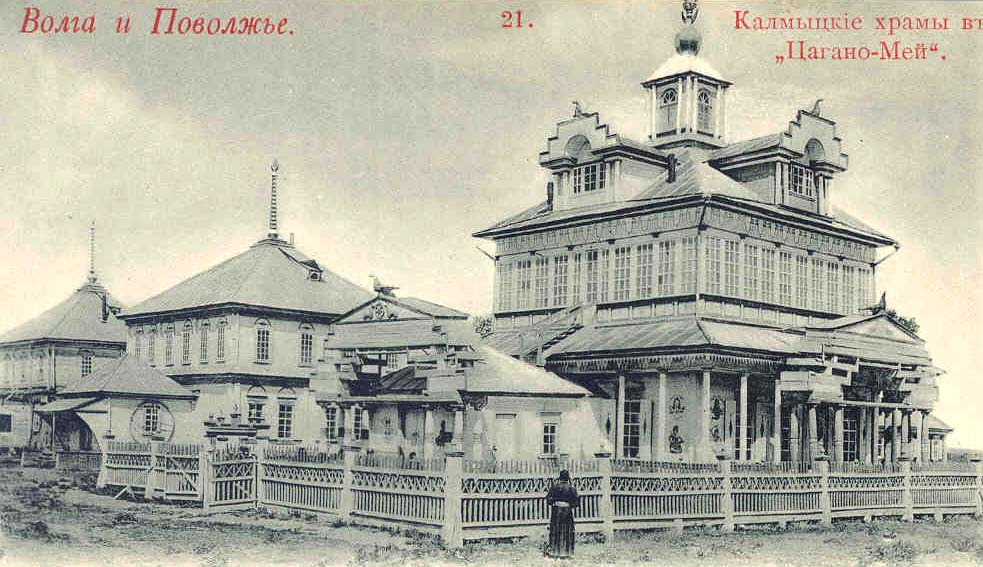
An image of a wooden Kalmyk khurul that once stood at the Tsagan Aman settlement near Astrakhan. Note the influence of Russian architecture. A new khurul of Tibetan design was built at Tsagan Aman several years ago.

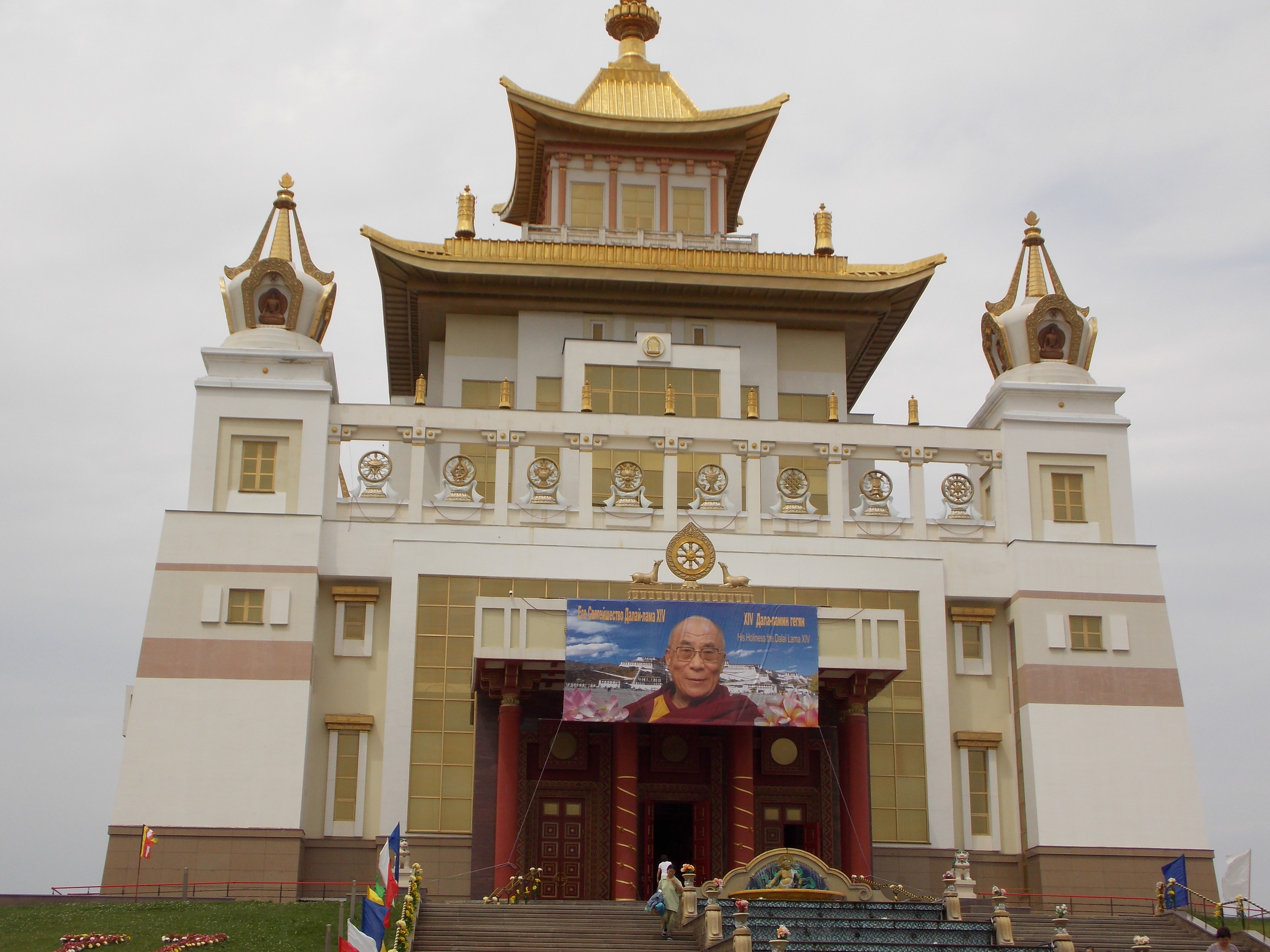
The Golden Temple in Elista

The Kalmyks are the only ethnic group inhabiting in Europe whose majority religion is Buddhism. They generally follow the Vajrayana tradition, namely Tibetan Buddhism. They embraced Tibetan Buddhism in the early part of the 17th century and belong to the Tibetan Buddhist sect known as the Gelugpa (Virtuous Way). The Gelugpa are commonly referred to as the Yellow Hat sect. This religion is derived from the North Indian Vajrayana Buddhism. In the West, it was formerly referred to as Lamaism, from the name of the Tibetan monks, the lamas.

Historically, Kalmyk clergy received their training either on the steppe or in Tibet. The pupils who received their religious training on the steppe joined Kalmyk monasteries, which were active centers of learning. Many of these monasteries operated out of felt tents, which accompanied the Kalmyk tribes as they migrated. The Oirats maintained tent monasteries throughout present-day eastern Kazakhstan and along the migratory route they took across southern Siberia to the Volga. They also maintained tent monasteries around Lake Issyk Kul in present-day Kyrgyzstan.

The Oirats also built stone monasteries in the regions of eastern Kazakhstan. For instance, the remains of stone Buddhist monasteries have been found at Almalik and at Kyzyl-Kent (See image to the right). In addition, there was a great Buddhist monastery in Semipalatinsk (seven palaces), which derives its name from that seven-halled Buddhist temple. Further, remains of Buddhist monasteries have been found at Ablaiket near Ust Kamenogorsk and at Talgar, near Almaty, and at Sumbe in the Narynkol region, bordering China.

Upon completion of training, Kalmyk clergy dispensed not only spiritual guidance but also medical advice. As clergymen, the Kalmyk lamas enjoyed great political influence among the nobility and held a strong influence over the general tribal population. For many commoners, the only path to literacy and prestige was to join the Kalmyk monastic system.

As a matter of policy, the Tsarist government and the Russian Orthodox Church sought to gradually absorb and convert any subject of another creed or nationality. The aim of the policy was to eliminate foreign influence and to entrench newly annexed areas. The baptized indigenous population would then become loyal to the Russian empire and would agree to be governed by Russian officials.

In the 1700s, some Kalmyks converted to Roman Catholicism; however their numbers were insignificant compared to the number of Kalmyk converts to Islam. One group of Kalmyk Muslims were known as the Tomuts, who were formed as the offspring of mixed marriages between Kalmyk women and Kazakh and Bashkir communities who lived among the Kalmyks. By the end of the 1730s they numbered around 600 tents. Another group of Kalmyk Muslims were known as the Sherets, and consisted of 120 tents. In 1733 they fled from the Derbet tayishi Cheter and settled near Azov. Later they were transferred to Crimea where they converted to Islam. In 1744, 233 Kalmyk men and 413 Kalmyk women were converted to Islam by the Astrakhan Tatars. Today, Sart Kalmyks living in Kyrgyzstan are predominantly Sunni Muslims.

A small percentage of Kalmyk-Cossack families in Belarus converted to Judaism in the early 19th century.

The Kalmyks migrated to territory annexed by the Tsarist government and were subject to this policy of conversion as long as they remained in this territory, but the efforts of the Tsarist government remained unsuccessful for the most part. However, the policy did contribute to the conversion of some of the Kalmyk nobility. One of the earliest converts were the children of Donduk-Ombo, the sixth Khan of the Kalmyks who reigned between 1737 and 1741, and his Circassian-born wife (See Dondukov family). Another important convert was Baksaday-Dorji, the grandson of Ayuka Khan who adopted the Christian name, Peter Taishin. Each conversion was motivated by political ambition to become the Kalmyk Khan. Kalmyk Tayishis, by contrast, were given salaries and towns and settlements were established for them and their ulus. Kalmyk converts, however, often continued to follow Buddhist law instead of Christian law.

Later on, the Tsarist government policy of encouraging Russian and German settlements along the Volga indirectly pressured Kalmyks to convert for economic reasons. The settlers took the most fertile land along the river, leaving barren lands for the Kalmyks to graze their herds. The resulting reduction of herds led to impoverishment for Kalmyk Tayishis, some of whom led their ulus to Christianity to obtain economic benefits.

To discourage the monastic lifestyle, the government required the building of permanent structures at government determined construction sites while imposing Russian architects. This policy resulted in the suspension of Lamaist canonical regulations governing monastery construction and in Kalmyk temples resembling Russian Orthodox churches. For example, the Khosheutovsky khurul is modeled after the Kazan Cathedral in St. Petersburg, Russia.

Other policies the Tsarist government implemented after the abolition of the Kalmyk Khanate in 1771, sought to gradually weaken the influence of the lamas. For instance, the government limited Kalmyk contact with Tibet. In addition, the Tsar began appointing the Šajin Lama (title of the High Lama of the Kalmyks). Further, the economic crises that resulted from settler encroachment forced many monasteries and temples to close and lamas to adopt a secularized lifestyle. The success of this policy is borne out by the decrease in the number of Kalmyk monasteries in the Volga region during the 19th century.

Number of Kalmyk monasteries in the Volga region
Year	Number
early 19th century	200
1834	76
1847	67
before 1895	62
before 1923	60+

Like the Tsarist government, the Communist regime was aware of the influence the Kalmyk clergy held over the general population. In the 1920s and the 1930s, the Soviet government implemented policies to eliminate religion through control and suppression. Towards that end, Kalmyk khuruls (temples) and monasteries were destroyed and property confiscated; the clergy and many believers were harassed, killed, or sent to labor camps; religious artifacts and books were destroyed; and young men were prohibited from religious training.

In the 1920s and 1930s, Buddhist temples and monasteries were destroyed and almost all of the spiritual leaders were arrested. By 1940 all Kalmyk Buddhist temples were either closed or destroyed and the clergy systematically oppressed. Dr. Loewenthal writes that the policies were so enforced that the Kalmyk clergy and Buddhism were not mentioned in the work by B. Dzhimbinov, "Sovetskaya Kalmykiya," published in 1940. In 1944, the Soviet government exiled all Kalmyks not fighting in the Soviet army to Central Asia and Siberia, accusing them of collaborating with Nazi Germany. Upon rehabilitation in 1957, the Kalmyks were permitted to return home from exile, but all attempts by them to restore their religion and to build a temple failed.

By the 1980s, the Soviet campaign against religion was so successful that a majority of the Kalmyks had never received any formal spiritual guidance. By the late 1980s, however, the Soviet government reversed course and implemented policies favoring the liberalization of religion. As a result, the first Buddhist community was organized in 1988. By 1995, there were 21 Buddhist temples, 17 places of worship for various Christian denominations, and 1 mosque in the Republic of Kalmykia.

On December 27, 2005, a new khurul named "Burkhan Bakshin Altan Sume", opened in Elista, and became known as the largest Buddhist temple in Europe. The temple was built in hopes of creating an international learning center for Buddhist scholars and students from all over the world, while also acting as a monument to the Kalmyk people who died in exile between 1944 and 1957.

The Kalmyks of Kyrgyzstan, referred to as "Sart Kalmyks," live primarily in the Karakol region of eastern Kyrgyzstan. It is unknown why, when, or from where this small group of Kalmyks migrated to eastern Kyrgyzstan. Due largely to their minority status, the Sart Kalmyks gradually adopted the Turkic language and culture of the majority Kyrgyz population. As a result, nearly all of them now belong to the Muslim faith.

Although Sart Kalmyks are Muslims, Kalmyks elsewhere by and large remain faithful to the Gelugpa Order of Tibetan Buddhism. In Kalmykia, for example, the Gelugpa Order with the assistance of the government has constructed numerous Buddhist temples. In addition, the Kalmyk people recognize Tenzin Gyatso, 14th Dalai Lama as their spiritual leader and Erdne Ombadykow, a Kalmyk American, as the supreme lama of the Kalmyk people. The Dalai Lama has visited Elista on a number of occasions. Buddhism and Christianity have been given the status of state religions. In November 2004 the 14th Dalai Lama visited Kalmykia. In October 2022, Erdne Ombadykow, the Supreme Lama of Kalmykia, condemned the Russian invasion of Ukraine and fled Russia to Mongolia. In January 2023, he was recognized in Russia as a foreign agent.

== Language ==
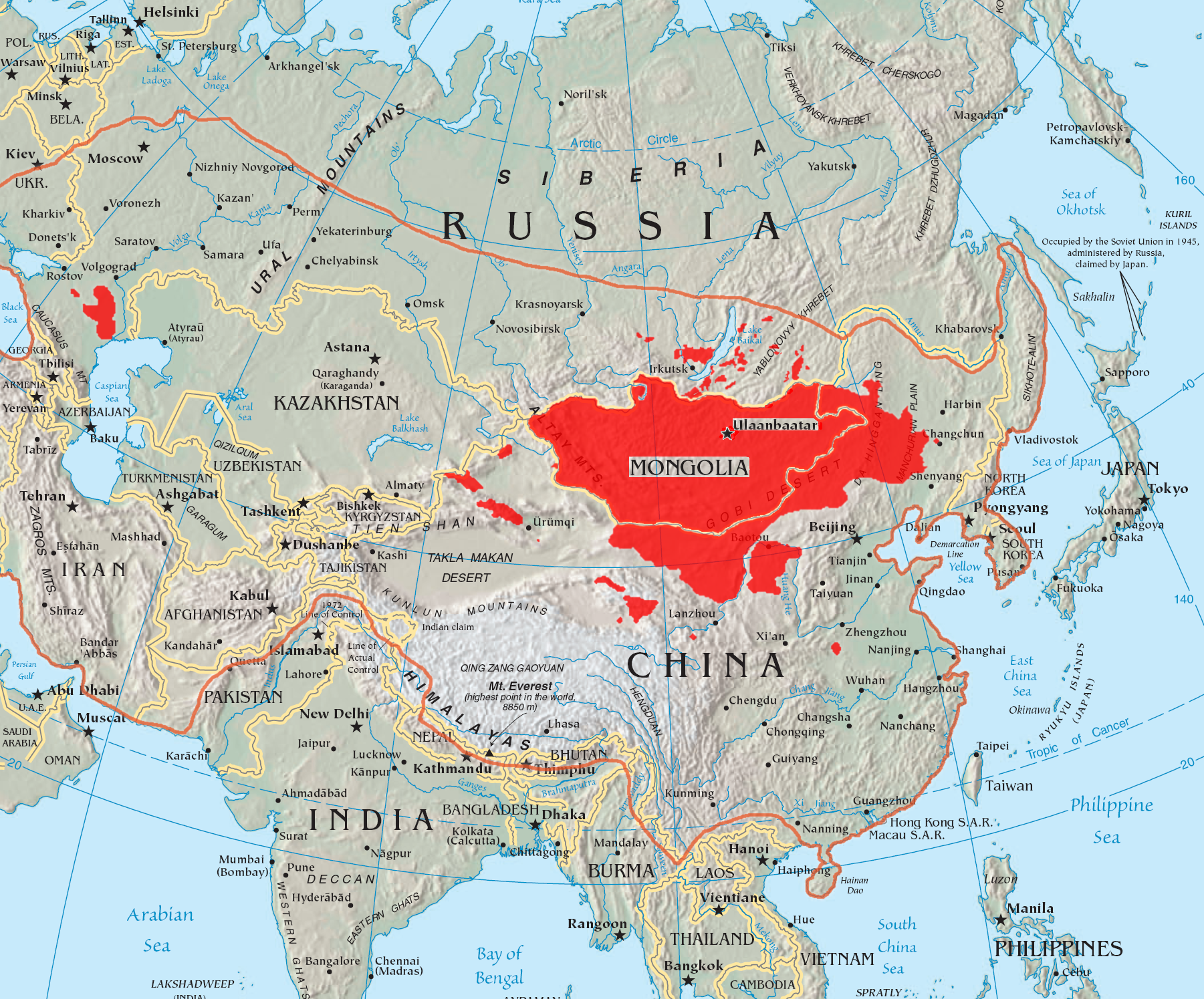
This map shows the boundary of the 13th-century Mongol Empire compared to today's Mongols. The red area shows where the majority of Mongolic speakers reside today.

Ethnologue classifies Kalmyk Oirat as a member of the Eastern branch of the Mongolic languages: "Mongolic, Eastern, Oirat-Khalkha, Oirat-Kalmyk-Darkhat". This places Standard Mongolian – which is essentially Khalkha Mongolian – and Kalmyk Oirat fairly close together.

Other linguists, such as Nicholas Poppe, have classified Kalmyk Oirat as belonging to the Western branch of the Mongolian language division and thus more distant from Khalkha and Standard Mongolian as spoken in modern Mongolia, since the language group developed separately and is distinct. Poppe also contends that Kalmyk and Oirat are two distinct languages in spite of little phonetic and morphological difference between them, and that the major distinction is in their lexicons. The Kalmyk language, for example, has adopted many words of Russian origin. Consequently, mainly on lexical grounds, Kalmyk is classified as a distinct language.

By population, the major dialects of Kalmyk are Torghut, Dörbet and Buzava. Minor dialects include Khoshut and Olöt. The Kalmyk dialects vary somewhat, but their differences are insignificant. Generally, the Russian language less influenced the dialects of the pastoral nomadic Kalmyk tribes of the Volga region.

In contrast, the Dörbets (and later on, Torghuts) who migrated from the Volga region to the Sal District of the Don Host Oblast took the name Buzava (or Don Kalmyks). The Buzava dialect developed from their close interaction with Russians. In 1798 the Tsarist government recognized the Buzava as Don Cossacks, both militarily and administratively. As a result of their integration into the Don Host, the Buzava dialect incorporated many words of Russian origin.

In 1938, the Kalmyk literary language started using Cyrillic script. During World War II, all Kalmyks not fighting in the Soviet Army were forcibly exiled to Siberia and Central Asia, where they were dispersed and not permitted to speak Kalmyk in public places. As a result, the Kalmyk language was not formally taught to the younger generation of Kalmyks. Upon return from exile in 1957, the Kalmyks spoke and published primarily in Russian. Consequently, the younger generation of Kalmyks primarily speak Russian and not their own native language. This is a subject of popular concern. In recent years, the Kalmyk government has made attempts to revive the Kalmyk language. Some laws have been passed regarding the usage of Kalmyk on shop signs; for example, on entrance doors, the words 'Entrance' and 'Push-Pull' appear in Kalmyk.

According to UNESCO's 2010 edition of the Red Book of Endangered Languages, the Kalmyk language classified as definitely endangered.

== Writing system ==
In the 17th century, Zaya Pandita, a Khoshut Buddhist monk, devised a writing system, Clear Script, based on the classical vertical Mongol script in order to phonetically capture the Oirat language. In the later part of the 19th and early part of the 20th centuries, Clear Script fell into disuse until the Kalmyks abandoned it in 1923 and introduced the Cyrillic script. In 1930, Kalmyk language scholars introduced a modified Latin alphabet, but it was not used for long.

== List of notable Kalmyks ==
- Vladimir Lenin (born 1870), Soviet leader
- Lyudmila Bodniyeva (born 1978), Russian handball player
- Jean Djorkaeff (born 1939), French footballer and manager
- Youri Djorkaeff (born 1968), French footballer
- Oka Gorodovikov (1879–1960), Russian military officer
- Kirsan Ilyumzhinov (born 1962), Russian oligarch and politician
- Sandje Ivanchukov (1960–2007), American soccer player
- Batu Khasikov (born 1980), Russian politician and kickboxer
- Maria Kirbasova (1941–2011), Russian human rights activist
- Lavr Kornilov (1870–1918), Russian military officer
- Eugenia Mandzhieva (born 1985), Russian fashion model
- Mingiyan Semenov (born 1990), Russian wrestler
- Roman Shogdzhiev (born 2015), Russian chess player
- Sanan Sjugirov (born 1993), Russian chess grandmaster
- Mingiyan Beveyev (born 1995), Russian football player
- Dinara Wagner (born 1999), Russian chess grandmaster
- Ngawang Wangyal (1901–1983), Buddhist lama and scholar

=== Khans of the Kalmyk Khanate ===
- Kho Erleg — 1580–1644
- Shukhur Daichin — 1654–1661
- Puntsug (Monchak) — 1661–1669
- Ayuka Khan — 1669–1724
- Tseren Donduk Khan — 1724–1735
- Donduk Ombo Khan — 1735–1741
- Donduk Dashi Khan — 1741–1761
- Ubashi Khan — 1761–1771

== See also ==
- Kalmyk name

== Bibliography ==
- Adelman, Fred (1960). Kalmyk Cultural Renewal (PhD thesis). University of Pennsylvania.
- Anonymous (1914). "Donskaia Oblast, Donskoi Pervyi Okrug, Donskoi Vtoroi Okrug" [The Don Region, First Don District, Second Don District]. Novyi Entsiklopedicheskii Slovar. Vol. XVI.
- Anuchin, D. (1914). "Kalmyki". Entsiklopedicheskii Slovar Brokgauz-Efrona. Vol. XIV.
- Arbakov, Dorzha (1958). "Chapter II, Complete Destruction of National Groups as Groups, The Kalmyks". In Nikolai Dekker; Andrei Lebed (eds.). Genocide in the USSR. Series I, No. 40. Munich: Institute for the Study of the USSR.
- Bajanowa, D. N. (1976). The Kalmyks.
- Borisov, T.K. (1926). Kalmykiya: A historic-political and socio-economic survey.
- Bormanshinov, Arash. (1990). The Kalmyks: Their Ethnic, Historical, Religious, and Cultural Background. Occasional Papers Number One. Kalmyk American Cultural Association.
- Bretschneider, E.V. (1910). Medieval Researches from Eastern Asiatic Sources. London: Kegan Paul, Trench, Trübner.
- Dunnell, Ruth W.; Elliott, Mark C.; Foret, Philippe; Millward, James A (2004). New Qing Imperial History: The Making of Inner Asian Empire at Qing Chengde. Routledge. ISBN 1134362226.
- Dzhimbinov, B. Sovetskaia Kalmykiia, Moscow, 1940.
- Grin, François (2000). Kalmykia: From Oblivion to Assertion (Report). ECMI Working Paper #10. European Center or Minority Issues.
- Grousset, René (1970). The Empire of the Steppes: A History of Central Asia. Rutgers University Press.
- Halkovic, Stephen A. (1985). Larry Moses (ed.). THE MONGOLS OF THE WEST. Indiana University Uralic and Altaic Series. Vol. 148. Bloomington: Research Institute for Inner Asian Studies, Indiana University.
- Haslund, Henning (1935). MEN AND GODS IN MONGOLIA. National Travel Club. New York: E.P. Dutton & Co., Inc.
- Heller, Mikhail; Nekrich, Aleksandr M. (1988). Utopia in Power: The History of the Soviet Union from 1917 to the Present. Summit Books.
- Krader, Lawrence (1963). Social Organization of the Mongol-Turkic Pastoral Nomads. Uralic and Altaic Series. Vol. 20. Indiana University Publications.
- Khodarkovsky, Michael (1992). Where Two Worlds Met: The Russian State and the Kalmyk Nomads 1600–1771. Cornell University Press.
- Khoyt, Sanj (2013-01-01). "Y-chromosome diversity in the Kalmyks at the ethnical and tribal levels". Journal of Human Genetics. 58 (12): 804–811. doi:10.1038/jhg.2013.108. PMID 24132124.
- Loewenthal, Rudolf (September 5, 1952). THE KALMUKS AND OF THE KALMUK ASSR: A Case in the Treatment of Minorities in the Soviet Union (Report). External Research Paper No. 101. Office of Intelligence Research, Department of State.
- Millward, James A. (1998). Beyond the Pass: Economy, Ethnicity, and Empire in Qing Central Asia, 1759–1864 (illustrated ed.). Stanford University Press. ISBN 0804729336.
- Pallas, P.S. (1779). Sammlungen historischer Nachrichten über die mongolischen Völkerschaften in einem asuführlichen Auszuge (in German). Bey Johann Georg Fleischer.
- Pelliot, Paul (1930). Notes sur le Turkestan. Vol. XXVII. T'oung Pao.
- Poppe, Nicholas N. (1970). The Mongolian Language Handbook. Center for Applied Linguistics.
- Pozdneev, A.M. (1914). "Kalmytskoe Verouchenie". Entsiklopedicheskii Slovar Brokgauz-Efrona. Vol. XIV.
- Riasanovsky, V.A. (1929). Customary Law of the Mongol Tribes (Mongols, Buriats, Kalmucks). Harbin.
- Schorkowitz, Dittmar (2023). Echoes from Russia's Colonial Past: The Pre-revolutionary Files of the Kalmyk National Archive, 3 vols. De Gruyter Oldenbourg.
- Schorkowitz, Dittmar (2010). ”Kalmücken (1943-1945).” In: Detlef Brandes, Holm Sundhaussen, Stefan Troebst (Eds.): Lexikon der Vertreibungen. Deportation, Zwangsaussiedlung und ethnische Säuberung im Europa des 20. Jahrhunderts, 326-29. Böhlau Verlag.
- Schorkowitz, Dittmar (2008). 'Wenn der Heulende am Blökenden herumkaut ...': Personennamen, Personennamengebrauch und Verwandtschaftsbezeichnungen bei den Kalmücken (Beiträge zur Lexikographie und Namenforschung 4). Baar-Verlag.
- Шорковиц, Д. (2004). «Структура, принципы и термины системы родства у калмыков (XVII – XIX вв.).» In: Н.Ц. Биткеев, Эдвин Овалов (Eds.): «Джангар» и проблемы эпического творчества. Материалы международной научной конференции (22-24 августа 1990 года), 446-63). АПП «Джангар».
- Schorkowitz, Dittmar (2001). Staat und Nationalitäten in Rußland. Der Integrationsprozeß der Burjaten und Kalmücken, 1822-1925 (Quellen und Studien zur Geschichte des östlichen Europa 61). Franz Steiner Verlag.
- Schorkowitz, Dittmar (2001). ”The Orthodox Church, Lamaism and Shamanism among the Buriats and Kalmyks, 1825-1925.” In: Robert Geraci, Michael Khodarkovsky (Eds.): Of Religion and Empire: Missions, Conversion, and Tolerance in Tsarist Russia, 201-25. doi:10.7591/9781501724305-009.
- Schorkowitz, Dittmar (1993). “Konsanguinal-politische Organisation und Grenzen der Souveränität bei den Kalmücken-Oiraten.“ In: Barbara Kellner-Heinkele (Ed.): Altaica Berolinensia. The Concept of So¬vereignty in the Altaic World [= Asiatische Forschungen 126], 229-39. Harrassowitz Verlag.
- Schorkowitz, Dittmar (1992). Die soziale und politische Organisation bei den Kalmücken (Oiraten) und Prozesse der Akkulturation vom 17. Jahrhundert bis zur Mitte des 19. Jahrhunderts: Ethnohistorische Untersuchungen über die mongolischen Völkerschaften (Europäische Hochschulschriften, Reihe XIX, Volkskunde, Ethnologie; Abt. B, Ethnologie 28). Peter Lang Verlag.
- Schorkowitz, Dittmar (1992). ”The Ranked Tributary Client System (Kyshtym) in Southern Siberia as the Decisive Point in the Foreign Relations of the Kalmuks and the Oyrats in the first half of the Seventeenth Century”. Russian History 19 (1-4): 459-74.
- Schorkowitz, Dittmar (1988). Die ethnohistorischen Archivdokumente zu den Kalmücken, Burjaten und Mongolen des Zentralstaatlichen Geschichtsarchivs (CGIA) und des Institutsarchivs für Ethnographie (AIĖ) in Leningrad – Этноисторические документы по калмыкам, бурятам и монголам Центрального Государственного Исторического Архива (ЦГИА) и Архива Института Этнографии (АИЭ) в Ленинграде (Bibliographische Mitteilungen des Osteuropa-Institutes an der Freien Universität Berlin 25). Harrassowitz Verlag.
- Ulanov, Mergen S.; Badmaev, Valeriy N.; Holland, Edward C. (2017-10-18). "Buddhism and Kalmyk Secular Law in the Seventeenth to Nineteenth Centuries". Inner Asia. 19 (2): 297–314. doi:10.1163/22105018-12340092. ISSN 1464-8172.
- Williamson, H.N.H. FAREWELL TO THE DON: The Russian Revolution in the Journals of Brigadier H.N.H. Williamson, John Harris, Editor, The John Day Company, New York, 1970.
- Jinglan, Wang; Xingzhou, Shao (1993-06-15). "Anthropological survey on the Mongolian Tuerhute Tribe in He Shuo County, Xinjiang Uighur Autonomous Region". Acta Anthropologica Sinica. 12 (2): 137–146. ISSN 1000-3193.
- Williamson, Hudleston Noel Hedworth (1970). Farewell to the Don: The Journal of Brigadier H. N. H. Williamson. Collins. ISBN 978-0-00-211164-5.
- Санчиров В. П. О Происхождении этнонима торгут и народа, носившего это название // Монголо-бурятские этнонимы: cб. ст. – Улан-Удэ: БНЦ СО РАН, 1996. C. 31–50.
- Galushkin, S.K.; Spitsyn, V.A.; Crawford, M.H. (2001). "Genetic Structure of Mongolic-Speaking Kalmyks". Human Biology. 73 (6). Wayne State University Press: 823–834. doi:10.1353/hub.2001.0079. hdl:1808/16193. ISSN 0018-7143. JSTOR 41466014. PMID 11804198.
- Khoyt, Sanj (2009). "Генетическая структура европейских ойратских групп по локусам ABO, RH, HP, TF, GC, ACP1, PGM1, ESD, GLO1, SOD-A" [Genetic Structure of European Oyrat groups based on loci ABO, RH, HP, TF, GC, ACP1, PGM1, ESD, GLO1, SOD-A]. Проблемы Этнической Истории И Культуры Тюрко-монгольских Народов. Сборник Научных Трудов (in Russian) (I). КИГИ РАН: 146–183.
- Хойт С.К. Антропологические характеристики калмыков по данным исследователей XVIII–XIX вв. // Вестник Прикаспия: археология, история, этнография. No. 1. Элиста: Изд-во КГУ, 2008. с. 220–243.
- Хойт С.К. Калмыки в работах антропологов первой половины XX вв. // Вестник Прикаспия: археология, история, этнография. No. 3, 2012. с. 215–245.
- Хойт С.К. Этническая история ойратских групп. Элиста, 2015. 199 с. (Khoyt S.K. Ethnic history of oyirad groups. Elista, 2015. 199 p). (in Russian)
- Хойт С.К. Данные фольклора для изучения путей этногенеза ойратских групп // Международная научная конференция «Сетевое востоковедение: образование, наука, культура», 7–10 декабря 2017 г.: материалы. Элиста: Изд-во Калм. ун-та, 2017. с. 286–289.
