= Franz Joseph Zoll =

German painter

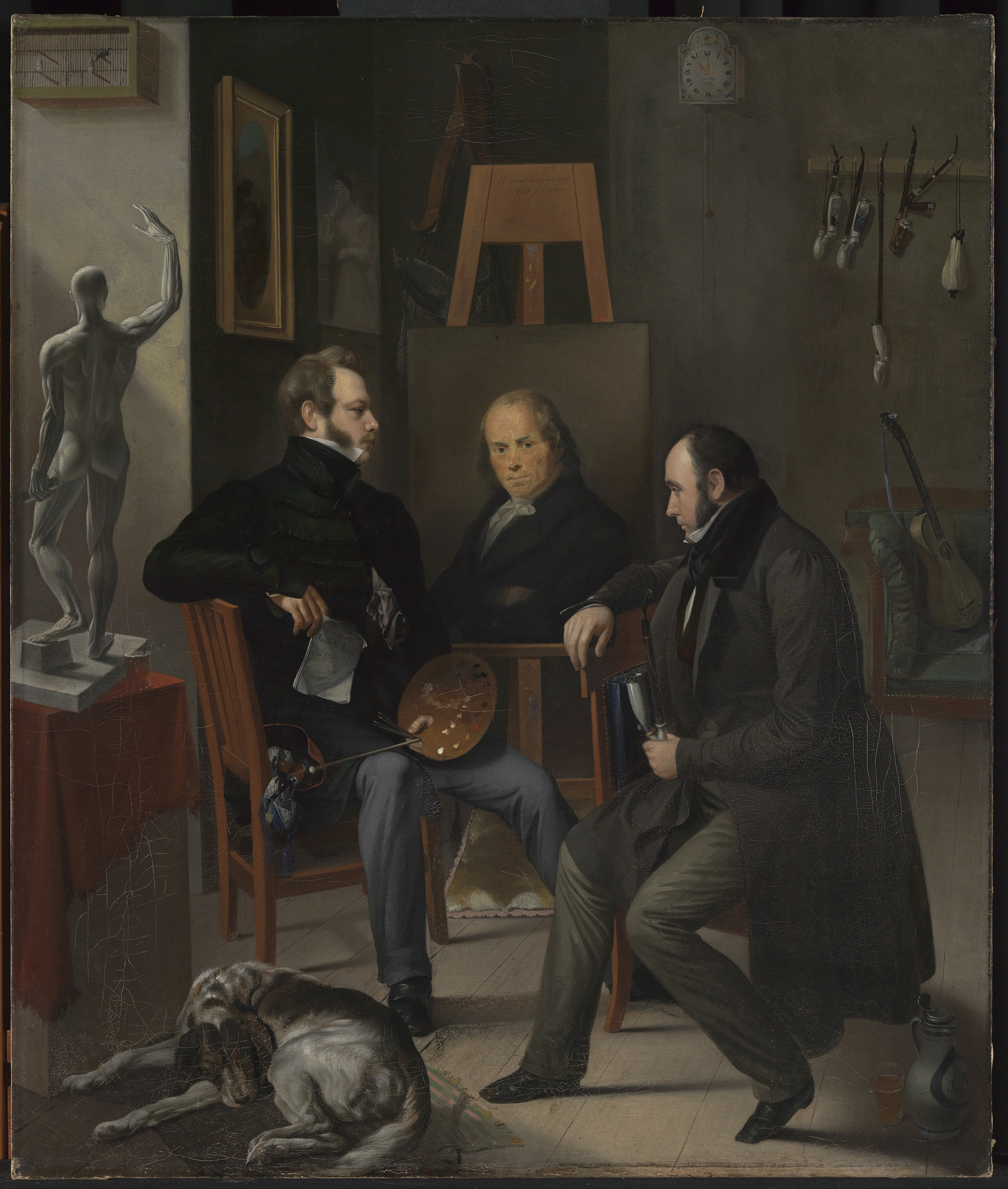
Votive picture for Franz Joseph Zoll

Franz Joseph Zoll was born at Möhringen an der Donau, in Baden, in 1772, and was first instructed by his father, a sculptor and painter. In his fourteenth year he went to Trostenberg in Bavaria, to an uncle who was a fresco painter, and then spent two years at Munich, studying under Johann Dorner and Joseph Hauber at the Academy. He visited Paris, Vienna, and Rome. In 1821 he became professor of design at Freiburg University, and in 1823 director of the Mannheim Gallery. He died in 1833. A Hercules and Hebe by him is in the Karlsruhe Gallery, and a Resurrection in the church of his birthplace. His early works were chiefly portraits.
