= Philipp Jakob Becker =

German painter (born 1763)

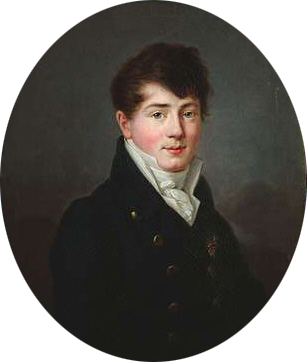
Prince William of Baden

Philipp Jakob Becker (born 1763) was a German painter born at Pforzheim. At seventeen years of age he went to Rome, where he studied and formed his style under Raphael Mengs and Maron. In 1785 he returned to Carlsruhe, having acquired in Italy a high degree of skill in every technical requirement of his art. But he was wanting in poetic fancy, and did not succeed in any remarkable manner in oil painting. He died at Erlenbad in 1829. He left a large number of drawings in crayons and sepia, many of them copies, but all admirable for the taste and finish displayed in their execution. He was for many years director of all the collections of paintings and engravings of the Grand Duke of Baden.

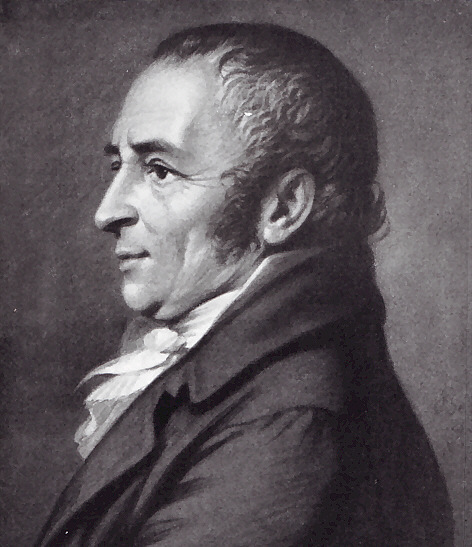
Johann Peter Hebel

== See also ==
- List of German painters
