= Kalmyk name =

Besides their own Kalmyk names, Kalmyks also use Sanskrit and Tibetan names, which came into their culture through Tibetan Buddhism. Contemporary Kalmyks can also have Russian and other European names, due to the Kalmyks' orientation towards the Russian language, after they joined Russia.

Original Kalmyk individual names from a semantic point of view:

1. The names of folk Kalmyk heroes - Sanal, Mergen, Jangar, Khongor, Mingiyan, Savr;
2. Derived from place names - Elistina, Ijil, Altskhuta, Kolor;
3. Words that describe colour or number - Tsagan (white), Nogan (green), Ulan (red), Zurgan (six), Tavn (five);
4. Words that describe positive personal traits: Syakhlia (beautiful - female), Dun (gracious - female), Bata (tough);
5. Words that describe worldly goods - Bayn (wealth), Jirgal (happiness, life), Bayr (joy), Altan (gold).

Tibetan and Sanskrit individual names from a semantic point of view:

1. Astronomical objects - Angarak (Mars), Bembya (Saturn), Adyan (Sun);
2. Buddhist terms - Sandji (enlightened), Buinta (goodness);
3. Positive personal traits and properties - Jav (protection), Tseren (long life).

Throughout history, Kalmyks were known for using amulet-names:

1. Words denoting animal names - Chon (wolf), Elya (eagle), Nokha (dog), Ayuka (bear cub);
2. Different plant names - Tsetsgia (flower);
3. Among the names given to protect someone from "bad spirits", non-Kalmyk names with distinctive transcription were also used - Vazki (from Vasiliy), Mikula (from Nicolay), Yagur (from Yegor). Some contemporary Kalmyk surnames are derived from amulet-names: Nokhaev, Chonov, Chonaev.

Double names were also quite well spread among the Kalmyks (in the Yandyko-Mochazhny, Khosheytsky and Erketenevsky uluses) - Bayken, Tauman, Sanji-Garya (in the Khosheutsky Kalmyk ulus Sanji-Ara), Erdne-Khal, Tseren-Dorji. Today, double names are reserved for patronymics. Another Kalmyk custom was that of the khadm (name taboo), required by a new wife. When entering her husband's family, she would create a new name by distorting his parents' names, e.g. Yadam instead of Badam, Yerj instead of Dorj.

After the introduction of the Russian administration (in the 16th century), Kalmyks received family names, derived from that of the father, like - Erdniev (from Erdny), Badmaev (from Badma), Kichikov (from Kichik). If a Kalmyk was called Nema, his surname would be Dordjiev, from his father's name Dorji but Nema's children's surnames would be Nemaev. Gradually, the family name became hereditary and a patronymic was added, derived from the father's name.

== See also ==
- Mongolian name
