= Kuorka =

Kuorka Куорка
- Selo
- Location within Republic of Buryatia Location within Russia
- Coordinates: 51°33′N 109°27′E
- Country: Russia
- Region: Republic of Buryatia
- District: Kizhinginsky District
- Time zone: UTC+8:00

Kuorka (Russian: Куорка; Buryat: Хөөрхэ, Khöörkhe) is a rural locality (a selo) in Kizhinginsky District, Republic of Buryatia, Russia. The population was 202 as of 2010. There are 7 streets.

== Geography ==
Kuorka is located 48 km southwest of Kizhinga (the district's administrative centre) by road. Novokizhinginsk is the nearest rural locality.
