= Bakhlayta =

Bakhlayta Бахлайта
- Ulus
- Location within Republic of Buryatia Location within Russia
- Coordinates: 51°47′N 110°01′E
- Country: Russia
- Region: Republic of Buryatia
- District: Kizhinginsky District
- Time zone: UTC+8:00

Bakhlayta (Russian: Бахлайта) is a rural locality (an ulus) in Kizhinginsky District, Republic of Buryatia, Russia. The population was 85 as of 2010. There are 4 streets.

== Geography ==
Bakhlayta is located 12 km southeast of Kizhinga (the district's administrative centre) by road. Sulkhara is the nearest rural locality.
