= Sulkhara =

Sulkhara Сулхара
- Settlement
- Location within Republic of Buryatia Location within Russia
- Coordinates: 51°44′N 110°09′E
- Country: Russia
- Region: Republic of Buryatia
- District: Kizhinginsky District
- Time zone: UTC+8:00

Sulkhara (Russian: Сулхара; Buryat: Сулхари, Sulkhari) is a rural locality (a settlement) in Kizhinginsky District, Republic of Buryatia, Russia. The population was 646 as of 2010. There are 12 streets.

== Geography ==
Sulkhara is located 24 km southeast of Kizhinga (the district's administrative centre) by road. Bakhlayta is the nearest rural locality.
