= Zagustay =

Zagustay Загустай
- Ulus
- Location within Republic of Buryatia Location within Russia
- Coordinates: 51°58′N 110°43′E
- Country: Russia
- Region: Republic of Buryatia
- District: Kizhinginsky District
- Time zone: UTC+8:00

Zagustay (Russian: Загустай; Buryat: Загаһатай, Zagahatai) is a rural locality (an ulus) in Kizhinginsky District, Republic of Buryatia, Russia. The population was 1,199 as of 2010. There are 11 streets.

== Geography ==
Zagustay is located 68 km east of Kizhinga (the district's administrative centre) by road. Khurtey is the nearest rural locality.
