= Ushkhayta =

Ushkhayta Ушхайта
- Selo
- Location within Republic of Buryatia Location within Russia
- Coordinates: 51°49′N 109°50′E
- Country: Russia
- Region: Republic of Buryatia
- District: Kizhinginsky District
- Time zone: UTC+8:00

Ushkhayta (Russian: Ушхайта) is a rural locality (a selo) in Kizhinginsky District, Republic of Buryatia, Russia. The population was 545 as of 2010. There are 9 streets.

== Geography ==
Ushkhayta is located 6 km southwest of Kizhinga (the district's administrative centre) by road. Kizhinga is the nearest rural locality.
