= Orot, Republic of Buryatia =

Orot Орот
- Ulus
- Location within Republic of Buryatia Location within Russia
- Coordinates: 51°54′N 109°38′E
- Country: Russia
- Region: Republic of Buryatia
- District: Kizhinginsky District
- Time zone: UTC+8:00

Orot (Russian: Орот; Buryat: Ород, Orod) is a rural locality (an ulus) in Kizhinginsky District, Republic of Buryatia, Russia. The population was 313 as of 2010. There are 3 streets.

== Geography ==
Orot is located 31 km northwest of Kizhinga (the district's administrative centre) by road. Ust-Orot is the nearest rural locality.
