= Innokentyevka, Republic of Buryatia =

Innokentyevka Иннокентьевка
- Selo
- Location within Republic of Buryatia Location within Russia
- Coordinates: 51°55′N 110°01′E
- Country: Russia
- Region: Republic of Buryatia
- District: Kizhinginsky District
- Time zone: UTC+8:00

Innokentyevka (Russian: Иннокентьевка) is a rural locality (a selo) in Kizhinginsky District, Republic of Buryatia, Russia. The population was 144 as of 2010. There are 3 streets.

== Geography ==
Innokentyevka is located 17 km northeast of Kizhinga (the district's administrative centre) by road. Ulzyte is the nearest rural locality.
