= Khurtey =

Khurtey Хуртэй
- Settlement
- Location within Republic of Buryatia Location within Russia
- Coordinates: 51°56′N 110°49′E
- Country: Russia
- Region: Republic of Buryatia
- District: Kizhinginsky District
- Time zone: UTC+8:00

Khurtey (Russian: Хуртэй; Buryat: Хүртэй, Khürtei) is a rural locality (a settlement) in Kizhinginsky District, Republic of Buryatia, Russia. The population was 859 as of 2010. There are 15 streets.

== Geography ==
Khurtey is located 78 km east of Kizhinga (the district's administrative centre) by road. Zagustay is the nearest rural locality.
