= Novokizhinginsk =

Novokizhinginsk Новокижингинск
- Selo
- Location within Republic of Buryatia Location within Russia
- Coordinates: 51°37′07″N 109°36′09″E
- Country: Russia
- Region: Republic of Buryatia
- District: Kizhinginsky District
- Time zone: UTC+8:00

Novokizhinginsk (Russian: Новокижингинск; Buryat: Шэнэ Хэжэнгэ, Shene Khejenge) is a rural locality (a selo) in Kizhinginsky District, Republic of Buryatia, Russia. The population was 1,806 as of 2010. There are 29 streets.

== Geography ==
Novokizhinginsk is located 36 km southwest of Kizhinga (the district's administrative centre) by road. Edermeg is the nearest rural locality.
