= Russian Journal of Genetics =

- Discipline: Genetics
- Language: English
- Edited by: Nikolay Yankovsky

Publication details
- History: 1994–present
- Publisher: Springer Science+Business Media
- Frequency: Monthly
- Impact factor: 0.581 (2020)

Standard abbreviations
- ISO 4: Russ. J. Genet.

Indexing
- CODEN: RJGEEQ
- ISSN: 1022-7954 (print); 1608-3369 (web)
- LCCN: 2008233689
- OCLC no.: 637609492

Links
- Journal homepage; Online archive

The Russian Journal of Genetics is a monthly peer-reviewed scientific journal covering genetics. It was established in 1994 and is published by Springer Science+Business Media. The editor-in-chief is Nikolay Yankovsky (Vavilov Institute of General Genetics). According to the Journal Citation Reports, the journal has a 2020 impact factor of 0.581.
