= Baikal Archaeology Project =

International archaeological team

The Baikal Archaeology Project (BAP) is an international team of scholars investigating Middle Holocene (about 9000 to 3000 years before present) hunter-gatherers of the Lake Baikal region of Siberia, Russia. The Project focuses on long-term patterns of culture change in the context of dynamic interactions with the environment. The Baikal Archaeology Project is based at the University of Alberta with Irkutsk State University being its main research partner on the Russian side. Other institutional collaborators of the project have included the University of Calgary, University of Saskatchewan, Grant MacEwan University, British Columbia Institute of Technology, University of Pennsylvania, University of California, Davis, Cambridge University, Oxford University, University College London, University of Aberdeen, and Institutes of Geochemistry and Earth’s Crust, Russian Academy of Sciences in Irkutsk and Irkutsk State Technical University in Russia. The Baikal Archaeology Project has been extensively funded by the Social Sciences and Humanities Research Council of Canada.

== Project history ==
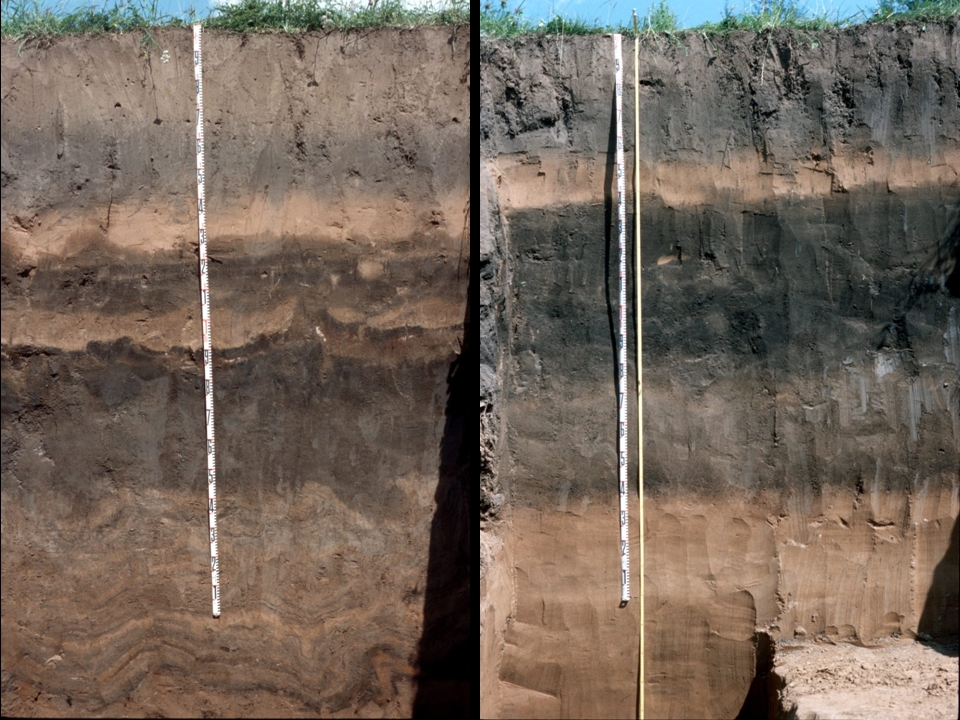
Excavation stratigraphic profiles

Archaeological research of the Lake Baikal region’s Middle Holocene hunter-gatherers began during the second half of the 19th century and was followed by a long period of intensive research conducted during the Soviet period by researchers such as Alexei Pavlovich Okladnikov. The Baikal Archaeology Project was formed in the mid-1990s during the time of profound political, social, and economic changes in Russia. Since then, the Baikal Archaeology Project launched an extensive multidisciplinary investigation of Middle Holocene hunter-gatherers of the Baikal region. The research model involves both original fieldwork and the application of modern laboratory techniques to previously as well as recently excavated collections of archaeological materials. Much of this work is facilitated by the presence of prehistoric cemeteries with well-preserved human remains – an unusual hunter-gatherer characteristic from a global perspective. Employing many advanced research methods and the integration of diverse lines of evidence generated by mortuary archaeology, zooarchaeology, radiocarbon dating, human osteology, isotope geochemistry, ancient and modern DNA research, ethnoarchaeology, and paleoclimatic and environmental studies, the project aims to achieve an improved understanding of the cultural complexity, variability, and dynamics of the long-term culture change among past boreal foragers in the Baikal region.

== Research objectives ==
The Middle Holocene archaeology of the Baikal region is attractive particularly owing to its wealth of well-preserved cemeteries as well as the availability of stratified habitation sites. The region also invites attention because of a unique pattern of culture change in which two periods of increased social complexity, as evidenced by large numbers of formal cemeteries dating to the Early Neolithic and the Late Neolithic–Bronze Age, are separated by a millennium-long Middle Neolithic period during which mortuary sites are entirely absent.

Period	Cemeteries	Tradition	Cal YBP
Late Mesolithic	Absent	Unknown	8800-8000
Early Neolithic	Present	Kitoi	8000-7200
Middle Neolithic	Absent	Unknown	7200-6000
Late Neolithic	Present	Isakovo, Serovo	6000-5000
Bronze Age	Present	Glazkovo	5000-4000

The first period of social complexity is associated with the Early Neolithic Kitoi culture, while the second period relates to the Late Neolithic and Bronze Age Isakovo, Serovo, and Glazkovo cultures, respectively. Since most of the current knowledge about the region’s Middle Holocene prehistory has been derived from examination of cemeteries, the Middle Neolithic, which lacks mortuary sites, does not enjoy the same level of archaeological identity as the preceding and following periods. Thus, it has often been referred to as the period of hiatus or discontinuity in the use of formal cemeteries.

Results from this research demonstrate that the discontinuity existed for as much as 1200 years and that the Early Neolithic and Late Neolithic–Bronze Age groups, which lived in the area on either side of this hiatus, were genetically dissimilar. Further differences between these pre- and post-hiatus groups are noted with regard to dietary preferences, subsistence and land use patterns, population size and distribution, social and political relations, and worldviews. Climate and environmental change in the region also seems to coincide with this period of discontinuity.

The two main research goals the Baikal Archaeology Project are:

(1) To define the biocultural and environmental parameters of the middle Holocene hunter-gatherer adaptations; and (2) To explain the documented spatial and temporal cultural variability.

== Materials ==
A substantial amount of research conducted by the Baikal Archaeology Project is dedicated to the comprehensive examination of several collections of human remains excavated in the Lake Baikal region either by the Project, or by earlier Russian scholars.

Excavated	Cemetery	Region	Age	No. of graves	No. of burials
Prior to BAP	Lokomotiv	Angara Valley	Early Neolithic	60	106
By BAP	Shamanka II	South Baikal	Early Neolithic, Bronze Age	111	189
Prior to BAP	Ust'-Ida	Angara Valley	Late Neolithic, Bronze Age	60	72
By BAP	Kurma XI	Baikal Little Sea	Early Neolithic, Bronze Age	27	23
By BAP	Khuzir-Nuge XIV	Baikal Little Sea	Bronze Age	79	89

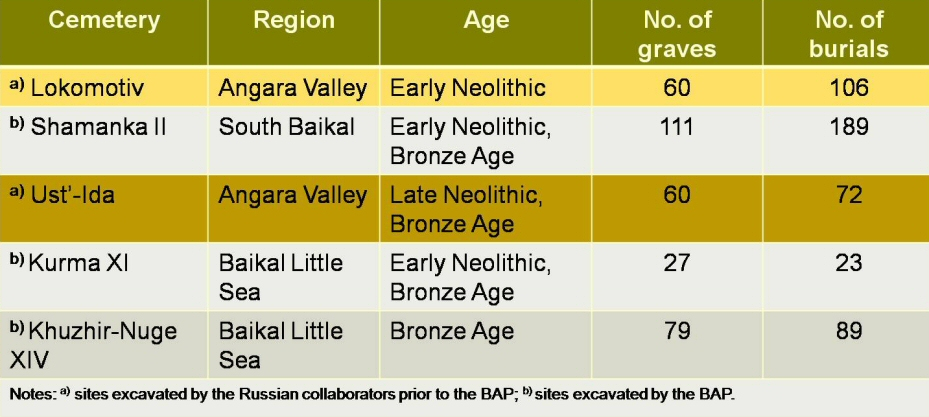
Collections of human remains examined by BAP.

== Project structure ==
The work of the Baikal Archaeology Project is organized within five research modules – Archaeology, Human Bioarchaeology, Human Genetics, Ethnoarchaeology, and Paleoenvironment – each addressing the Project’s general objectives with a different, but complementary, methodology. The Archaeology, Human Bioarchaeology, and Human Genetics modules supply the primary data on the Middle Holocene hunter-gatherers, while the Paleoenvironment and Ethnoarchaeology modules provide a broad interpretive framework for the bioarchaeological data.

The Archaeology Module examines development, use, and spatial organization of the region’s numerous hunter-gatherer cemeteries, mortuary protocols, social and political organization, migrations and mobility patterns, as well as the overall spatiotemporal variability in hunter-gatherer adaptations. Zooarchaeologists study hunting and fishing strategies based on faunal remains from archaeological sites. Of particular interest is documenting past exploitation of aquatic resources (including Nerpa, the freshwater seal of Lake Baikal) for which the region is famous.

Bioarchaeological research provides information about health, paleodemography and activity patterns Bone chemistry permits a much better resolution of the spatial and temporal variability of diet and subsistence, which are also very important additional measures of mobility and social organization.

The ancient mtDNA material obtained from human remains excavated from the Baikal region’s prehistoric cemeteries has demonstrated the genetic discontinuity between the Early Neolithic and Late Neolithic to Bronze Age peoples, the genetic similarity between the latter two, and has revealed new aspects of social and political complexity among the Early Neolithic groups. Examination of modern DNA materials in the context of the ancient DNA information allows assessment of the genetic history of native Siberians.

Paleoenvironmental research, which involves both extensive fieldwork and computer modeling techniques, has identified a period of climatic change affecting the Baikal region that coincided chronologically with the end of the Early Neolithic Kitoi culture. While this change is believed to be the most significant in the region's entire Holocene climate history, it appears that its impact may have been greatest on the semi-arid areas south and east of Lake Baikal rather than on the more forested west and north.

Ethnographic and ethnohistoric research focuses upon how indigenous Buriat, Evenki, and Sakha peoples have adapted to boreal environments in general, and its coastal, alpine, and steppe niches in particular. The module has also discovered, in 11 Siberian cities, a series of documents from the 1926 Polar Census in Siberia, which is the richest dataset on boreal hunter-gatherers yet known.

== Fieldwork and field schools ==
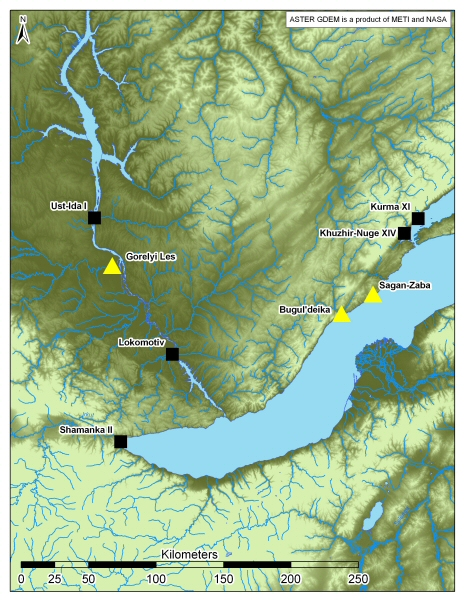
Map of the Baikal region with location of archaeological fieldwork sites.

Researchers of the Archaeology, Paleoenvironment, and Ethnoarchaeology modules have conducted intensive fieldwork in many locations around Lake Baikal. Archaeologists excavated the cemeteries of Shamanka, Khuzhir-Nuge XIV, and Kurma XI, all located on the shores of Lake Baikal. This work expanded the existing collection of Middle Holocene burials in the region by c. 300 individuals, thus creating new research opportunities. Excavations were also carried out at the stratified habitation sites of Gorelyi Les in the Angara valley and Sagan-Zaba and Bugul’deika coves on Lake Baikal, providing archaeological data covering the entire Holocene. In conjunction with these excavations, the Baikal Archaeology Project organized archaeological field schools which attracted participants from Russia, Canada, USA, United Kingdom, and Poland.

Cemeteries

- K14: Khuzhir-Nuge XIV
- KUR: Kurma XI
- LOK: Lokomotiv
- UID: Ust'-Ida
- SHA: ShamankaII

Habitation Sites

- BUG: Bugul'deika
- GL: Gorelyi Les
- S-Z: Sagan-Zaba

The Paleonvironment module conducted fieldwork at numerous locations around Lake Baikal including its western shores (lakes Shara and Khall), the valleys of the Lena (Basovo), Selenga (Burdukovo), and Kirenga (Krasnyi Yar) rivers, the Tunka Valley (lake Arky) west of Baikal, and northern Mongolia. This work involved detailed examination of Holocene lake core records (pollen, diatom and macrofossils) and stratified floodplain sediments for high resolution paleoenvironmental reconstructions.

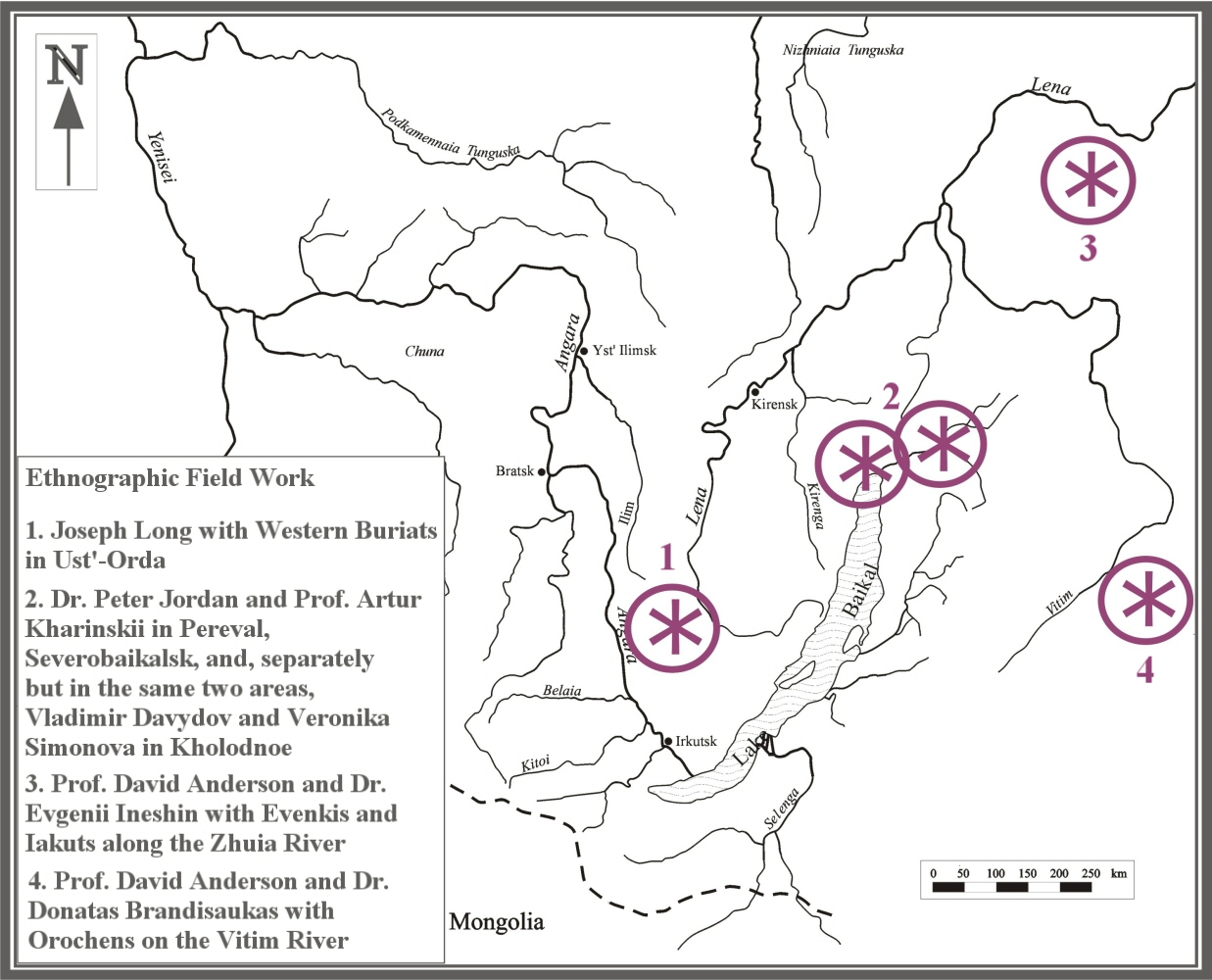
Map of the Baikal region with location of ethnographic and ethnoarchaeological fieldwork sites.

The Ethnoarchaeology module organized field research with Evenki and Sakha hunters and reindeer herders at sites in the Bodaibo District (Irkutsk oblast’), Zhuia River Valley, Severobaikalsk District (Buriat Republic), and villages of Essei and Olenok. This fieldwork is designed to provide the Baikal Archaeology Project with modern examples of subsistence action in specific lacustrian and riverine landscapes, characteristic also of the Middle Holocene hunter-gatherer groups.

== Dissemination ==
The Baikal Archaeology Project has organized three international conferences (in Canada, Russia and Scotland), several conference sessions, and dozens of workshops and seminars. Project scholars and graduate students have produced numerous journalism papers, doctoral dissertations and masters’ theses, as well as five monographs under its Northern Hunter-Gatherers Research Series, published by Canadian Circumpolar Institute Press, University of Alberta. The most important publications are listed below.

== Publications and references ==
=== References ===
Note: Bold font indicates BAP project members.

=== Further reading ===
==== Monographs ====
1. Turov, M.G. 2010. Evenki Economy in the Central Siberian Taiga at the Turn of the 20th Century: Principles of Land Use. Northern Hunter-Gatherers Research Series, Vol. 5. Edmonton: Canadian Circumpolar Institute Press. English edition prepared by A. Weber and K. Maryniak. Originally published as Khoziaistvo evenkov taezhnoi zony Srednei Sibiri v kontse XIX – nachale XX v.: Printsipy osvoeniia ugodii (Izd-vo Irkutskogo universiteta, 1990).
2. Sirina, A.A. 2006. Katanga Evenkis in the 20th Century and the Ordering of their Life-world. Translated edn. with glossary and index, edited by D.G. Anderson. Northern Hunter-Gatherers Research Series, Vol. 2. Edmonton: Canadian Circumpolar Institute Press. Originally published as Katangskie evenki v XX veke: Rasselenie, organizatsiia sredy zhiznedeiatel'nosti. 2nd rev. edn. (Moscow–Irkutsk: Ottisk, 2002).

==== Research papers ====
1. **Preece, R.C., White, D. 2008**. Incidence and Persistence of Reversed Coiling in Quaternary Land Snails. Basteria, vol. 72(4-6): 65–69.

==== Dissertations and theses ====
defended over the course of BAP

1. Brandisauskas, B. 2009. The Concept of Mastery Among Zabaikal Orochen-Evenkis in Siberia. Ph.D. dissertation. Department of Anthropology, University of Aberdeen.
2. Drouin, B. 2004. Grave Architecture at Khuzhir-Nuge XIV: An Early Bronze Age Cemetery from Cis-Baikal, Siberia. M.A. thesis. Department of Anthropology, University of Alberta.
3. Gustafson, E.P. 2007. Teeth and DNA: The mining of Mesolithic and Neolithic teeth in a non-destructive manner. M.A. thesis. Department of Laboratory Medicine and Pathology, University of Alberta.
4. Lam, Y-M. 1993. Dietary Patterns During the Baikal Neolithic. Ph.D. dissertation. Department of Anthropology, University of Alberta.
5. Lieverse, A. 1999. Human Taphonomy at Khuzhir-Nuge XIV, Siberia. MA thesis. Department of Anthropology, University of Alberta.
6. Lieverse, A. 2005. Bioarchaeology of the Cis-Baikal: Biological Indicators of Mid-Holocene Hunter-Gatherer Adaptation and Cultural Change. Ph.D. dissertation. Department of Anthropology, Cornell University.
7. Link, D. 1996. Hunter-Gatherer Demography and Health in the Cis-Baikal Neolithic. Ph.D. dissertation. Department of Anthropology, University of Alberta.
8. McKenzie, H.G. 2006. Mortuary variability among Middle Holocene hunter-gatherers in the Cis-Baikal region of Siberia, Russia. Ph.D. dissertation. Department of Anthropology, University of Alberta.
9. Meaney, M. 2009. Reconstructing Holocene environmental change in central Asia, with special focus on diatom analysis from a remote, upland lake. M.Sc. thesis. University College London.
10. Metcalf, M. 2006. The Bronze Age Cemetery of Kurma XI: A Contribution to Understanding the Mortuary Variability and Social Organization of Hunters and Gatherers of Siberia, Russia. M.A. thesis. Department of Anthropology, University of Alberta.
11. Mooder, K. 2004. mtDNA and Prehistoric Siberian Hunter-Gatherers: Characterising Matrilineal Population Affinities in Neolithic and Bronze-Age Cis-Baikal. Ph.D. dissertation. Department of Laboratory Medicine and Pathology, University of Alberta.
12. Nomokonova, T. 2007. Zooarchaeological Study of Faunal Remains from the Ityrkhei Site on Lake Baikal, Siberia. M.A. thesis. Department of Anthropology, University of Alberta.
13. Novikov, A.G. 2007. Pogrebal'naia praktika naseleniia glazkovskoi kul'tury Pribaikal'ia: po materialam mogil'nika Khuzhir-Nuge XIV [Mortuary practices of the Glazkovo culture population in the Cisbaikal: Based on materials from the Khuzhir-Nuge XIV cemetery]. Candidate of History dissertation. Department of Archaeology and Ethnography, Irkutsk State University.
14. Nunes, A. 2007. A Holocene Environmental Reconstruction from an Upland Lake in the Baikal Region, Siberia, using Chironomid and Organic Geochemical Analyses. M.Sc. thesis. University College London.
15. Robertson, C. 2006. Grave Disturbance Patterns at the Bronze Age Cemetery Khuzhir-Nuge XIV, Siberia. M.A. thesis. Department Of Anthropology, University of Alberta.
16. Sears, A. 2009. Bulk organic geochemical and stable isotope environmental change since the Late Glacial from Shara Nur lake sediments, Olkhon Island, Lake Baikal. M.Sc. thesis. University College London.
17. Thomson, T. 2006. Examination of mtDNA polymorphisms from the Shamanka II cemetery. M.A. thesis. Department of Anthropology, University of Alberta.
18. Weitzel, M. 2005. Human Taphonomy: Khuzhir-Nuge XIV, Siberia and Edmonton, Alberta. Ph.D. dissertation. Department of Anthropology, University of Alberta.
19. White, D. 2006. Holocene climate and culture change in the Lake Baikal region, Siberia. Ph.D. dissertation. Department of Anthropology, University of Alberta.
