= Kizhinga =

Kizhinga Кижинга
- Selo
- Interactive map of Kizhinga
- Location of Kizhinga Kizhinga (Republic of Buryatia)
- Coordinates: 51°50′49″N 109°54′39″E
- Country: Russia
- Federal subject: Buryatia
- Administrative district: Kizhinginsky District
- SelsovietSelsoviet: Kizhinginsky
- Founded: 1915
- Elevation: 701 m (2,300 ft)

Population (2010 Census)
  - Total: 6,373
  - Estimate (2021): 6,376 (+0%)

Administrative status
  - Capital of: Kizhinginsky District, Kizhinginsky Selsoviet

Municipal status
  - Municipal district: Kizhinginsky Municipal District
  - Rural settlement: Kizhinginsky Somon Rural Settlement
  - Capital of: Kizhinginsky Municipal District, Kizhinginsky Somon Rural Settlement
- Time zone: UTC+8 (MSK+5)
- Postal code: 671450
- OKTMO ID: 81627433101

Kizhinga (Russian: Кижинга́, Buryat and Mongolian: Хэжэнгэ, romanized: Khejenge) is a rural locality (a selo) and the administrative center of Kizhinginsky District of the Republic of Buryatia, Russia. Population: 6,373 (2010 census); 6,579 (2002 census); 7,347 (1989 Soviet census).
