= Kizhinginsky District =

Kizhinginsky District Кижингинский район (Russian)
- District

Other transcription(s)
  - Buryat: Хэжэнгын аймаг
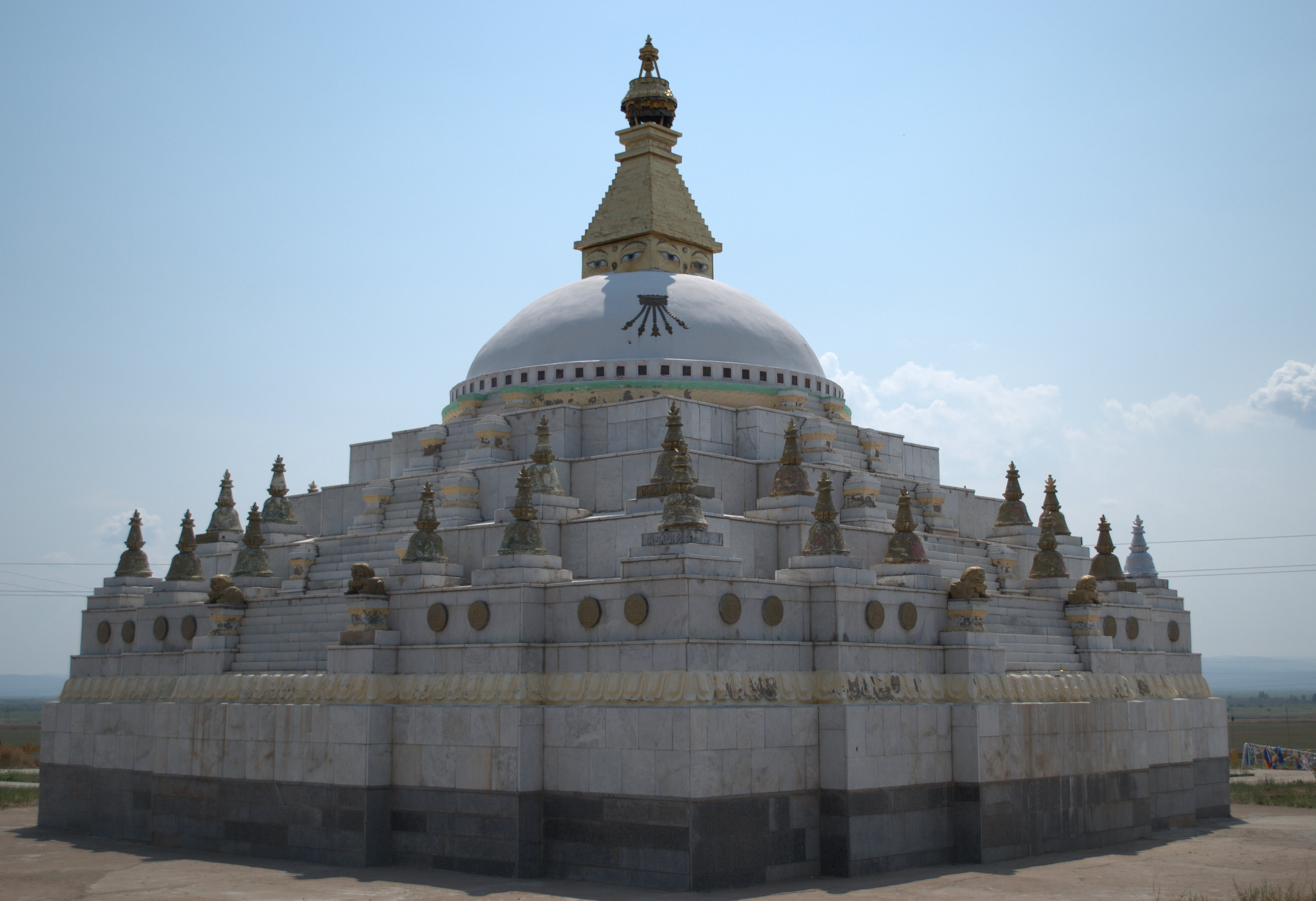
- Dzharun Khashor, the largest stupa in the Republic of Buryatia, is located in Kizhinginsky District

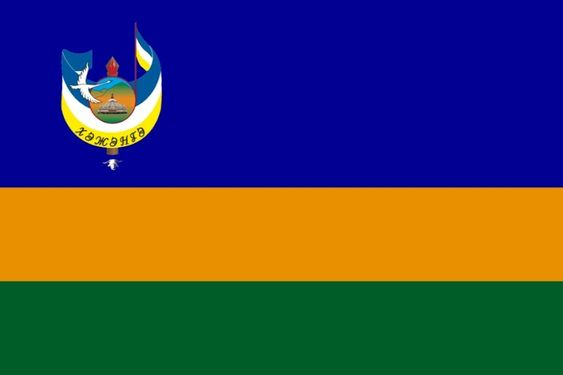
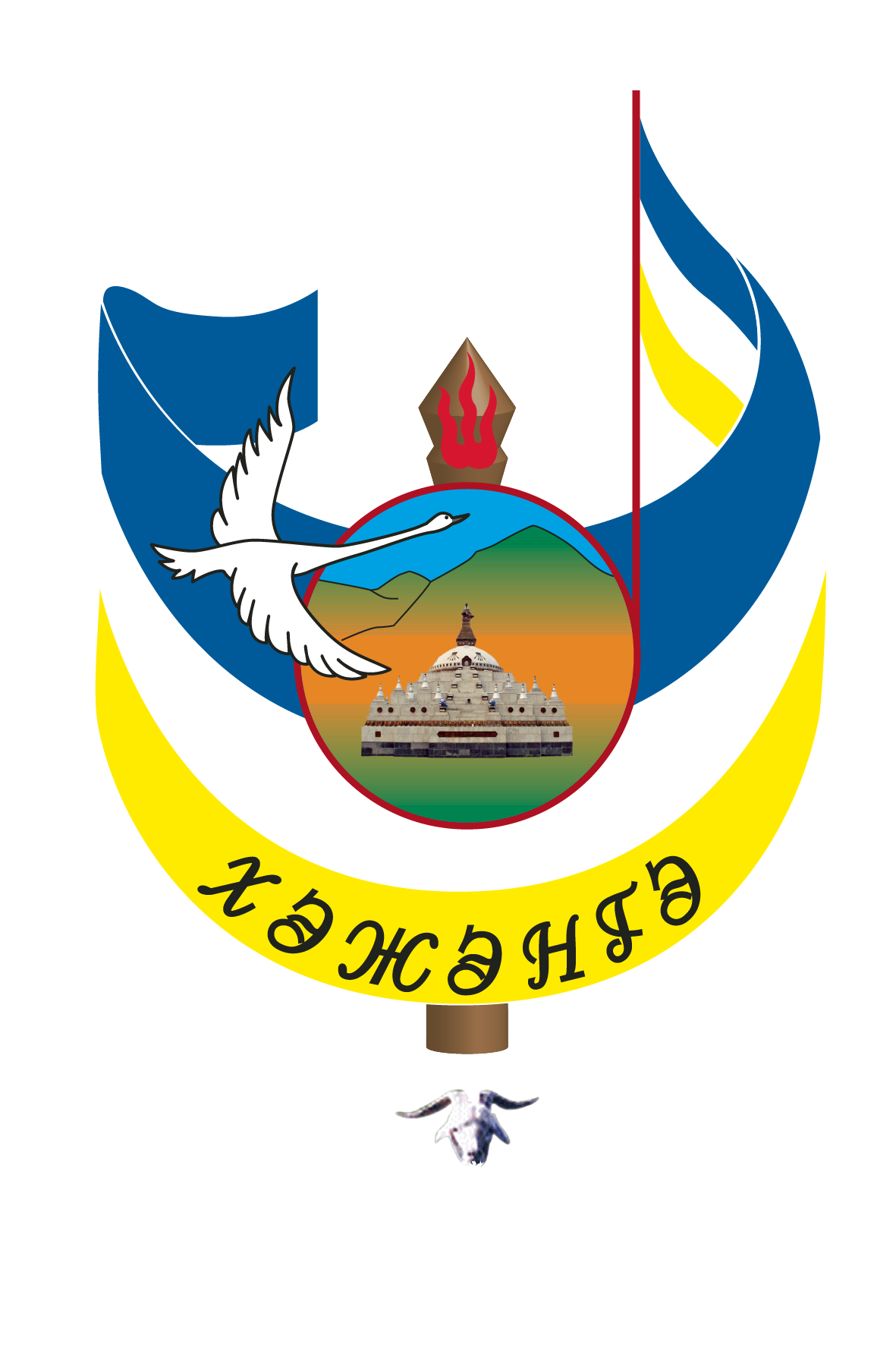
- Flag Coat of arms
- Location of Kizhinginsky District in the Buryat Republic
- Coordinates: 51°51′N 109°55′E
- Country: Russia
- Federal subject: Republic of Buryatia
- Established: December 12, 1940
- Administrative center: Kizhinga

Area
  - Total: 7,871 km^{2} (3,039 sq mi)

Population (2010 Census)
  - Total: 16,509
  - Density: 2.097/km^{2} (5.432/sq mi)
  - Urban: 0%
  - Rural: 100%

Administrative structure
  - Administrative divisions: 2 Selsoviets, 7 Somons
  - Inhabited localities: 21 rural localities

Municipal structure
  - Municipally incorporated as: Kizhinginsky Municipal District
  - Municipal divisions: 0 urban settlements, 9 rural settlements
- Time zone: UTC+8 (MSK+5)
- OKTMO ID: 81627000
- Website: http://www.adm.kizhinga.ru

Population of Kizhinginsky District
- 2010 Census: 16,509
- 2002 Census: 18,142
- 1989 Census: 21,769
- 1979 Census: 21,048

Kizhinginsky District (Russian: Кижинги́нский райо́н; Buryat: Хэжэнгын аймаг, Khejengyn aimag) is an administrative and municipal district (raion), one of the twenty-one in the Republic of Buryatia, Russia. It is located in the south of the republic. The area of the district is 7,871 square kilometers (3,039 sq mi). Its administrative center is the rural locality (a selo) of Kizhinga. As of the 2010 Census, the total population of the district was 16,509, with the population of Kizhinga accounting for 38.6% of that number.

== History ==
The district was established on December 12, 1940, when its territory was split from Khorinsky District.

== Administrative and municipal status ==
Within the framework of administrative divisions, Kizhinginsky District is one of the twenty-one in the Republic of Buryatia. The district is divided into two selsoviets and seven somons, which comprise twenty-one rural localities. As a municipal division, the district is incorporated as Kizhinginsky Municipal District. Its two selsoviets and seven somons are incorporated as nine rural settlements within the municipal district. The selo of Kizhinga serves as the administrative center of both the administrative and municipal district.
