= Jorightu Khan =

Jorightu Khan (Mongolian: Зоригт хаан ᠵᠣᠷᠢᠭᠲᠤ) is the Mongolian title meaning "brave king". It could refer to:

- Jorightu Khan Yesüder, a 1300s Mongol ruler of the Northern Yuan.
- Ubashi Khan, a 1700s Torghut Mongol leader who led his people in a migration from Russian Empire to Qing-controlled Xinjiang.
