= Oirats =

Westernmost group of Mongols

Өөрд Öörd ᡆᡕᡅᠷᠠᡑ
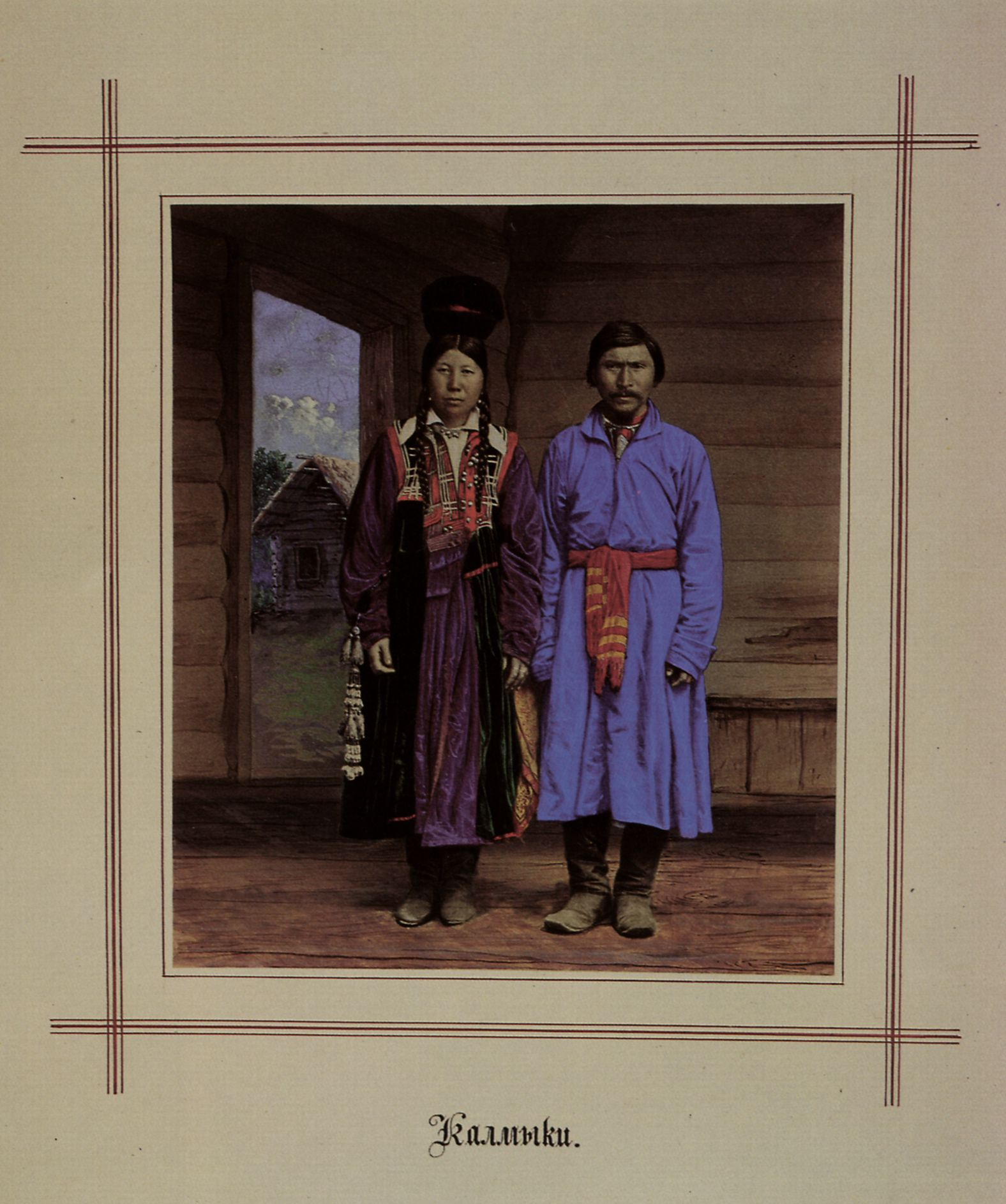
- Kalmyks, a subgroup of the Oirats

Total population
- 885,893

Regions with significant populations
- China (mainly in Xinjiang and Qinghai): 422,000 (2020)
- Mongolia: 284,346 (2025)
- Russia: 179,547 (2021 census)
- ∟ Kemerovo Oblast: 500 (2021)
- Kyrgyzstan: 12,000 (2018)
- Uzbekistan: 1,000
- Other: 5,000

Languages
- Mainly: Oirat, Russian, other Mongolian languages Regional: Chinese

Religion
- Tibetan Buddhism, Mongolian shamanism Minority: Islam

Related ethnic groups
- Kalmyks, and other Mongol peoples

Oirats (Note: /ˈɔɪ.ræt/; Mongolian: Ойрад [ˈɞe̯ɾə̆t]) or Oirds, (Note: Mongolian: Ойрд [ˈɞe̯ɾə̆t]; Oirat: Өөрд [ˈøːɾə̆t]) formerly known as Eluts and Eleuths, (Note: /ɪ.ˈluːt/ or /ɪ.ˈljuːθ/; pinyin: Èlǔtè) are the westernmost group of Mongols, whose ancestral home is in the Altai region of Siberia, Xinjiang and western Mongolia.

The first documented reference to Elut and Yelut was in the Ongin "rune" inscriptions dated in the sixth century. The dating of the Oirats to the 13th century is based on the text of the Secret History of the Mongols. Historically, the Oirats were composed of four major tribes: Dzungar (Choros or Olots), Torghut, Dörbet and Khoshut. The modern Kalmyks of Kalmykia on the Caspian Sea in southeastern Europe are Oirats.

== Etymology ==
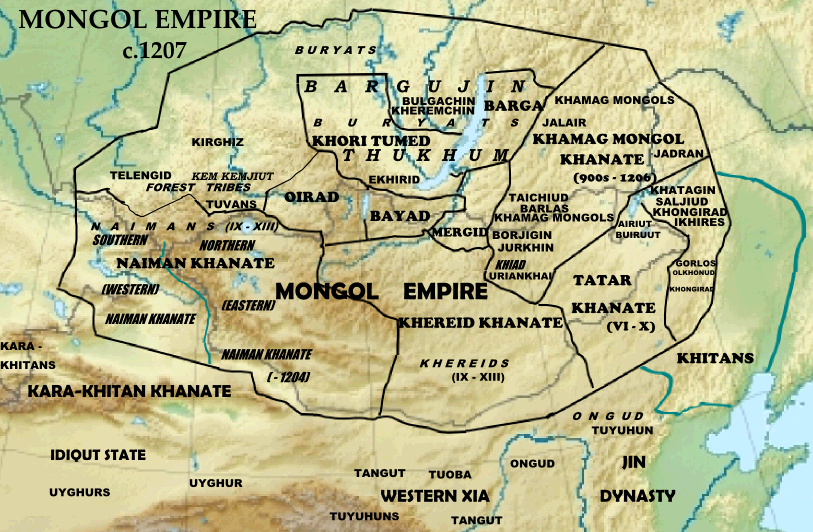
The Mongol Empire c. 1207

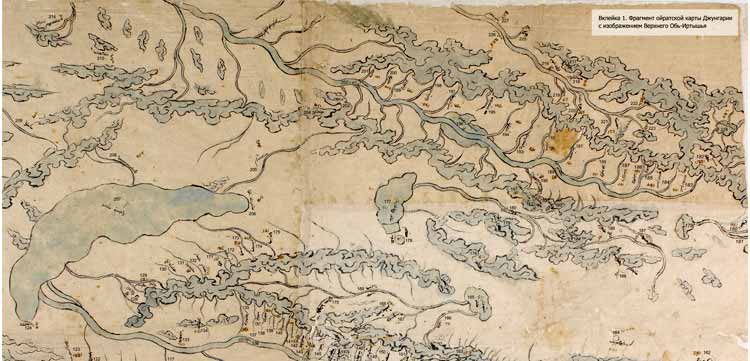
A fragment of a medieval map of Dzungar Khanate

The name derives from Mongolic oi < *hoi ("forest, woods") and ard < *harad ("people"), who were counted among the "forest people" in the 13th century. An opinion believes the name derives from the Mongolian word oirt meaning "close" (in distance) as in "close/nearer ones."

The name Oirat may derive from a corruption of the group's original name Dörben Öörd, meaning "The Allied Four". Perhaps inspired by the designation Dörben Öörd, other Mongols at times used the term "Döchin Mongols" for themselves ("Döchin" meaning forty), but there was rarely as great a degree of unity among larger numbers of tribes as among the Oirats.

== Writing system ==
In the 17th century, Zaya Pandita, a Gelug monk of the Khoshut tribe, devised a new writing system called Clear Script for use by Oirats. This system was developed on the basis of the older Mongolian script, but had a more developed system of diacritics to preclude misreading and reflected some lexical and grammatical differences that the Oirat language has from Mongolian.

Clear Script remained in use in Kalmykia until the mid-1920s when it was replaced by a Latin alphabet, and later the Cyrillic script. It can be seen in some public signs in the Kalmyk capital, Elista, and is superficially taught in schools. It was likewise replaced in Mongolia by the Cyrillic alphabet in 1941. Some Oirats in China still use the Clear Script as their primary writing system, as well as Mongolian script.

A monument of Zaya Pandita in Kalmykia was unveiled on the 400th anniversary of Zaya Pandita's birth, and on 350th anniversary of his creation of the Clear Script.

== History ==
The Oirats share some history, geography, culture and language with the Eastern Mongols, and were at various times united under the same leader as a larger Mongol entity, whether that ruler was of Oirat descent or of Chingissids.

Comprising the Khoshut (Mongolian: "хошууд", Hošuud), Choros ("цорос", Coros), Ölöt ("өөлд", Ööld), Torghut ("торгууд", Torguud), and Dörbet ("дөрвөд", Dörvöd) ethnic groups, they were dubbed Kalmyk or Kalmak, which means "remnant" or "to remain", by their western Turkic neighbours. Various sources also list the Bargut, Buzava, and Tumed tribes as comprising a part of the Dörben Öörd; some tribes may have joined the original four only in later years. This name may, however, reflect the Kalmyks' remaining Buddhist rather than converting to Islam; or the Kalmyks' remaining in the Altay region.

After the fall of the Yuan dynasty, Oirat and Eastern Mongols had developed separate identities to the point where Oirats called themselves "Four Oirats" while they used the term "Mongols" for those under the Khagans in the east.

=== Early history ===
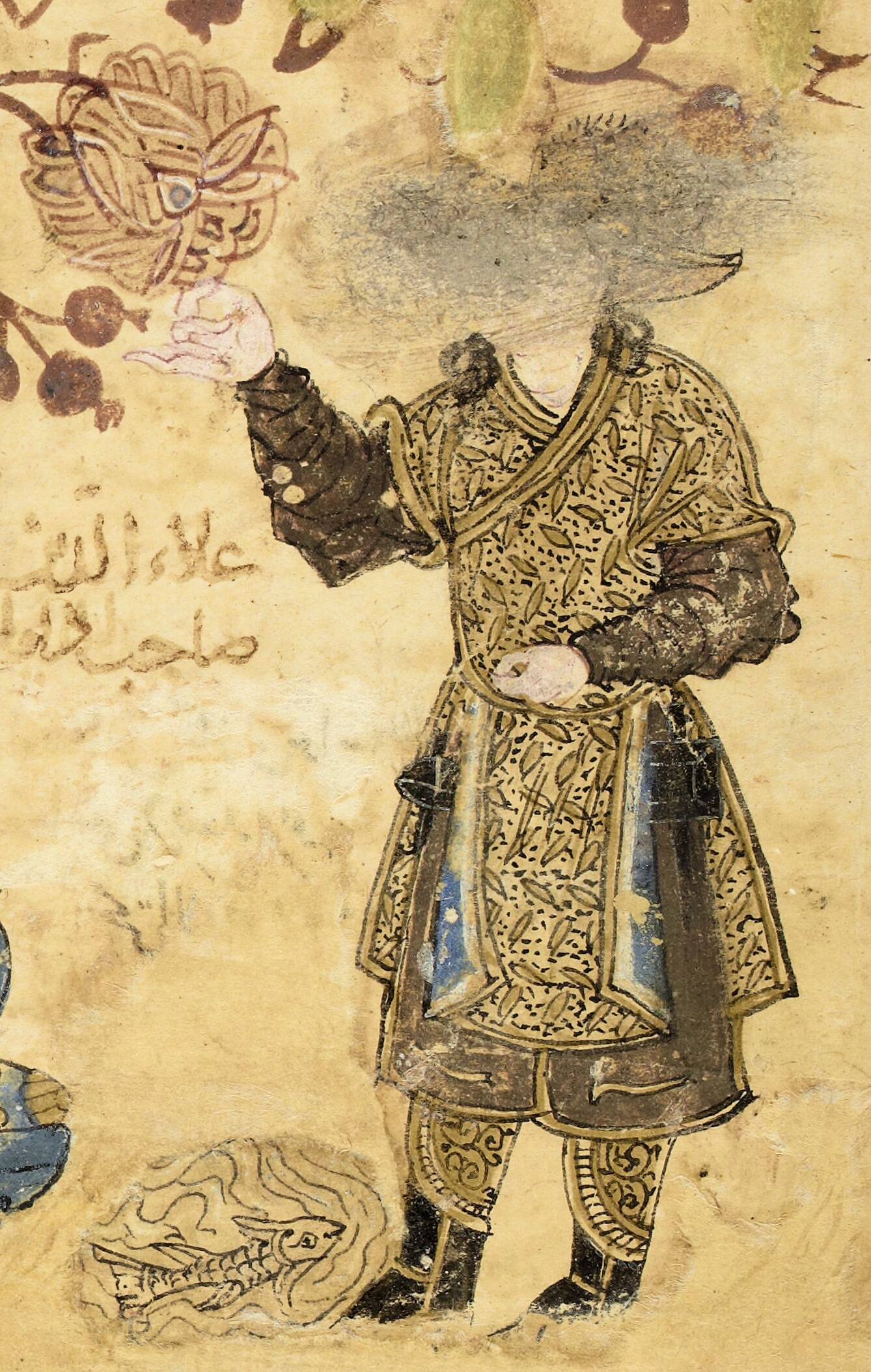
The Oirat ruler Arghun Aqa (damaged) in Tārīkh-i Jahān-Gushā 'The History of The World Conqueror", dated 1290. Suppl. Pers. 205 – Bibliothèque Nationale de France.

One of the earliest mentions of the Oirat people, in a historical text, can be found in the Secret History of the Mongols, a 13th century chronicle of Genghis Khan's rise to power.

In the Secret History, the Oirats are counted among the "forest people", and are said to live under the rule of a shaman-chief known as bäki. They lived in Tuva and the Mongolian Khövsgöl Province; the Oirats moved south in the 14th century.

In one famous passage, the Oirat chief Qutuqa Beki used a yada, or 'thunder stone', to unleash a powerful storm on Genghis' army. The magical ploy backfired, however, when an unexpected wind blew the storm back towards him. During the early stages of Genghis' rise to power, the Oirats fought against Genghis but were defeated. The Oirats would then fully submit to Mongol rule after their ally, Jumukha, Genghis' childhood friend and later rival, was killed.

Subject to the Khan, the Oirats became a loyal and formidable faction of the Mongol war machine. In 1207, Jochi, the eldest son of Genghis, subjugated the forest tribes, including the Oirats and the Yenisei Kyrgyz; the Great Khan gave those peoples to his son, Jochi, and had one of his daughters, Checheygen, marry chief Khudukh-bäki (or his son). There were notable Oirats in the Mongol Empire, such as Arghun Agha and his son, Nawruz.

In 1256, a group of the Oirats under Bukha-Temür (Mongolian: Буха-Төмөр, Бөхтөмөр) joined Hulagu's expedition against the Abbasids and participated in the Mongol campaign against the Nizaris in Iran. Then, they took part in the Second Battle of Homs, where the Mongols were defeated. The majority of the Oirats, who were left behind, supported Ariq Böke against Kublai in the Toluid Civil War. Kublai defeated his younger brother, and they entered the service of the victor.

In 1295, more than 10,000 Oirats under Targhai Khurgen, son-in-law of the Borjigin family, fled Syria, then under the Mamluks, as they were despised by both Muslim Mongols and local Turks. They were well-received by Egypt's Sultan, Al-Adil Kitbugha, himself of Oirat origin. Ali Pasha, the governor of Baghdad and head of an Oirat ruling family, went on to murder Ilkhan Arpa Keun, resulting in the disintegration of Mongol Persia. Since the Oirats were near both the Chagatai Khanate and the Golden Horde, they had strong ties with them, and many Mongol khans had Oirat wives.

After the expulsion of the Yuan dynasty from China, the Oirats reconvened as a loose alliance of the four major western Mongolian tribes (Mongolian: дөрвөн ойрд, дөрвөн ойрaд). The alliance grew, taking power in the remote region of the Altai Mountains, northwest of Hami oasis. Gradually, they spread eastwards, annexing territories then under the control of the Eastern Mongols. They hoped to reestablish a unified, nomadic rule under their banner of the Four Oirats.

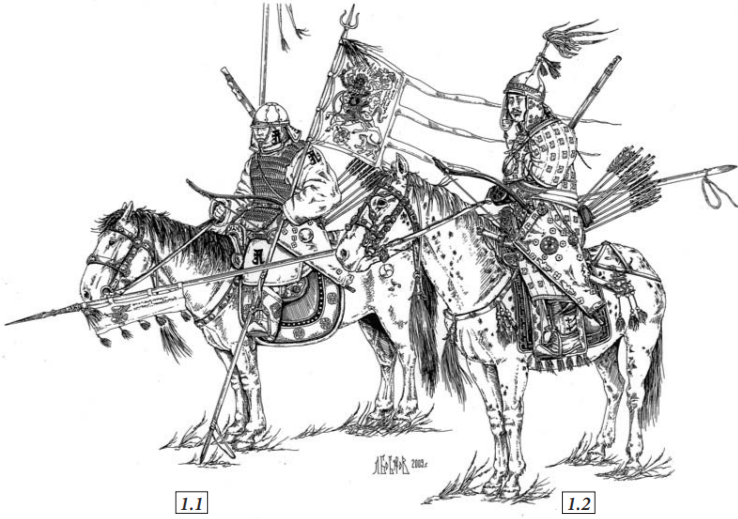
Oirat warriors in the 17th century

The only Borjigid ruling tribe was the Khoshuts; the others' rulers were not descendants of Genghis. The Ming dynasty of China had helped the Oirats' rise over the Mongols during the Yongle Emperor's reign after 1410, when the Ming defeated the Qubilaid Öljei Temür and the Borjigid power was weakened. The Borjigid Khans were displaced from power by the Oirats (with Ming help), ruling as puppet-khans until the alliance between the Ming and Oirats ended, and the Yongle Emperor launched a campaign against them.

The greatest ruler of the Oirat Confederacy was Esen Taishi; he led the Oirats from 1438 to 1454, a time in which he unified Mongolia (both Inner and Outer) under his puppet-khan Taisun Khan. In 1449, Esen Taishi and Taisun Khan mobilised their cavalry along the Chinese border and invaded Ming China, defeating and destroying the Ming defences at the Great Wall, along with the reinforcements sent to intercept their cavalry. In the process, the Zhengtong Emperor was captured at Tumu. The following year, Esen returned the emperor after an unsuccessful ransom attempt. After claiming the title of Khan (something which only blood descendants of Genghis Khan could do), Esen was killed; shortly afterwards, Oirat power declined.

From the 14th until the middle of the 18th century, the Oirats were often at war with the Eastern Mongols, but reunited with them during the rule of Dayan Khan and Tümen Zasagt Khan.

=== The Khoshut Khanate ===
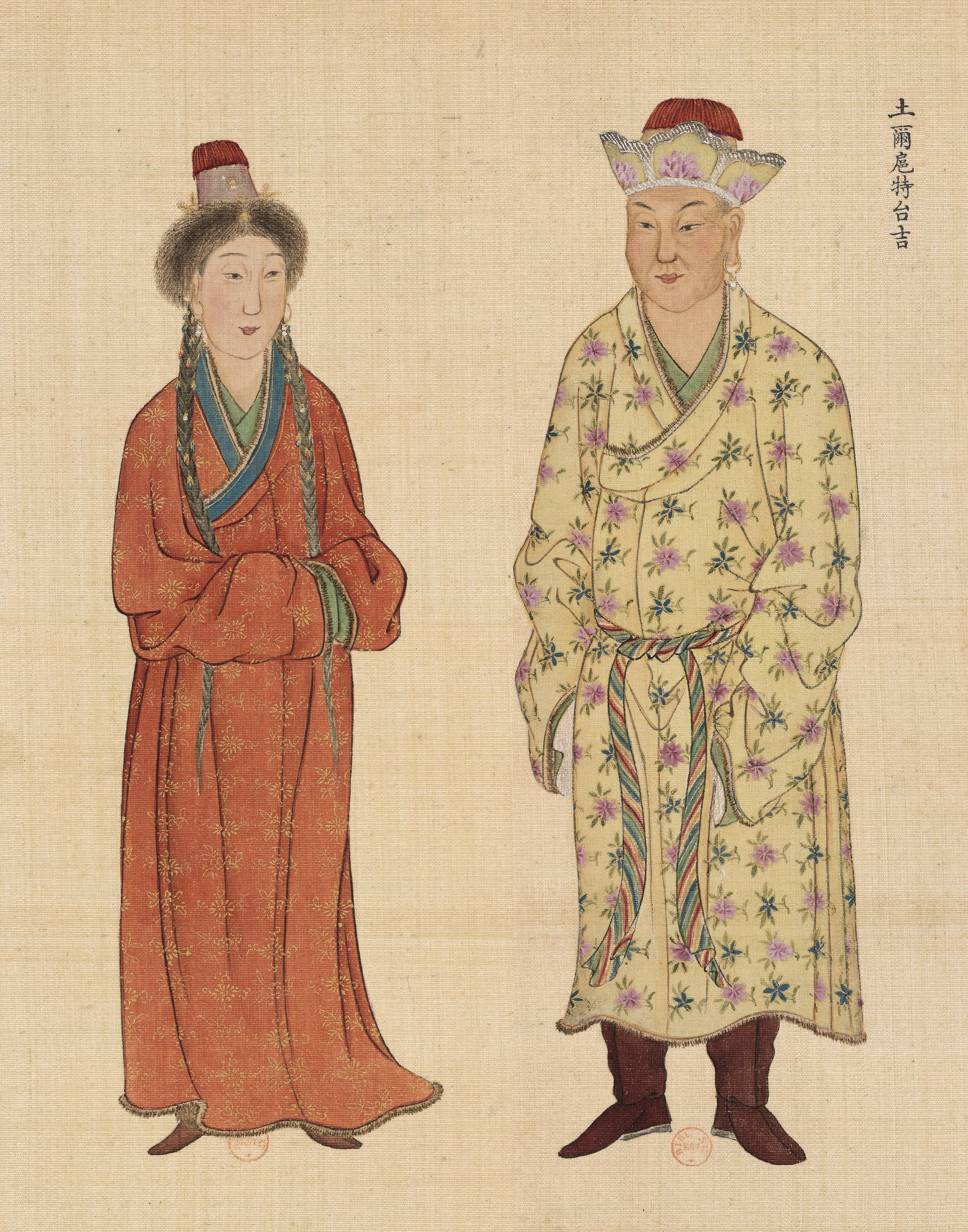
Taiji (prince) of the Torghuts, one of the main Oirat tribes, and his wife (土爾扈特台吉). Huang Qing Zhigong Tu, 1769.

The Oirats converted to Tibetan Buddhism around 1615, and it was not long before they participated in the conflict between the Gelug and Karma Kagyu schools. At the request of the Gelug school, in 1637, Güshi Khan, the leader of the Khoshuts in Koko Nor, defeated Choghtu Khong Tayiji, the Khalkha prince who supported the Karma Kagyu school, and conquered Amdo (present-day Qinghai). The unification of Tibet followed in the early 1640s, with Güshi Khan proclaimed Khan of Tibet by the 5th Dalai Lama and the establishment of the Khoshut Khanate. The title "Dalai Lama" itself was bestowed upon the third lama of the Gelug tulku lineage by Altan Khan (not to be confused with the Altan Khans of the Khalkha), and means, in Mongolian, "Ocean of Wisdom".

Amdo, meanwhile, became home to the Khoshuts. In 1717, the Dzungars invaded Tibet and killed Lha-bzang Khan (or Khoshut Khan), a grandson of Güshi Khan and the fourth Khan of Tibet, and conquered the Khoshut Khanate.

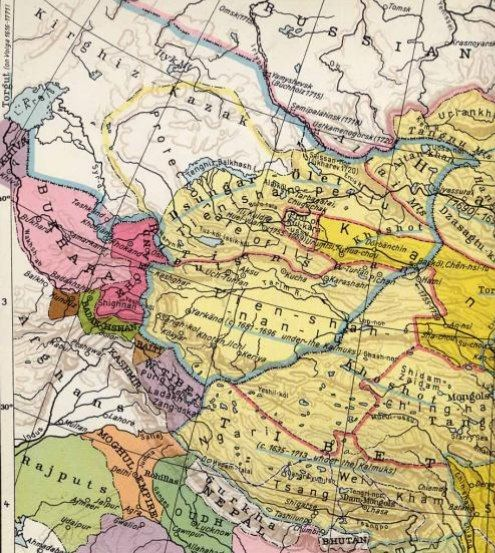
The Zunghar Khanate at 1750 (light-blue color)

The Qing Empire defeated the Dzungars in the 1750s and proclaimed rule over the Oirats through a Manchu-Mongol alliance (a series of systematically arranged marriages between princes and princesses of Manchu with those of Khalkha Mongols and Oirat Mongols, which was set up as a royal policy carried out over 300 years), as well as over Khoshut-controlled Tibet.

In 1723, Lobzang Danjin, another descendant of Güshi Khan, took control of Amdo and tried to assume rule over the Khoshut Khanate. He fought against a Qing army, and was defeated only in the following year with 80,000 people from his tribe executed by Manchu army due to his "rebellion attempt". By that period, the Upper Mongolian population reached 200,000 and were mainly under the rule of Khalkha Mongol princes who were in a marital alliance with Manchu royal and noble families. Thus, Amdo fell under Manchu domination.

=== The Dzungar Khanate ===
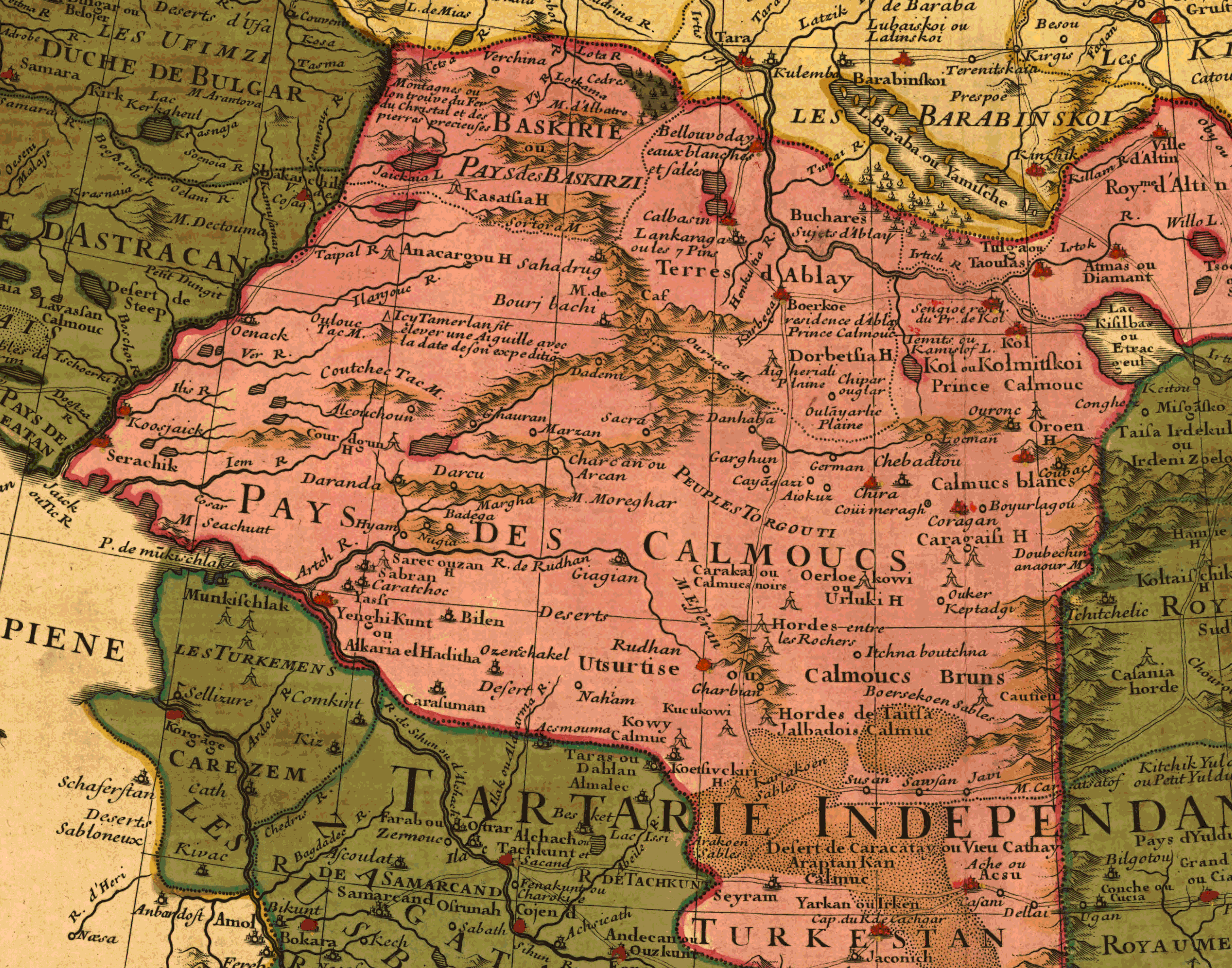
This map fragment shows territories of the Zunghar Khanate as in 1706 (Map Collection of the Library of Congress: "Carte de Tartarie" of Guillaume de L'Isle (1675–1726)).

The 17th century saw the rise of another Oirat empire in the east, known as the Khanate of Dzungaria, which stretched from the Great Wall of China to present-day central Kazakhstan, and from present-day northern Kyrgyzstan to southern Siberia. It was the last empire of nomads, and was ruled by Choros noblemen.

The Transition from Ming to Qing dynasties in China occurred during the mid-17th century, and the Qing sought to protect its northern border by continuing the divide-and-rule policy their Ming predecessors had successfully instituted against the Mongols. The Manchu consolidated their rule over the Eastern Mongols of Manchuria. They then persuaded the Eastern Mongols of Inner Mongolia to submit themselves as vassals. Finally, the Eastern Mongols of Outer Mongolia sought the protection of the Manchu against the Dzungars.

The Kazakh–Dzungar Wars (1643–1741/42) were a series of long conflicts between the Kazakh Juzes and Dzungar Khanate. The strategic goal for the Dzungars was to increase their territories by taking lands of the Kazakhs.

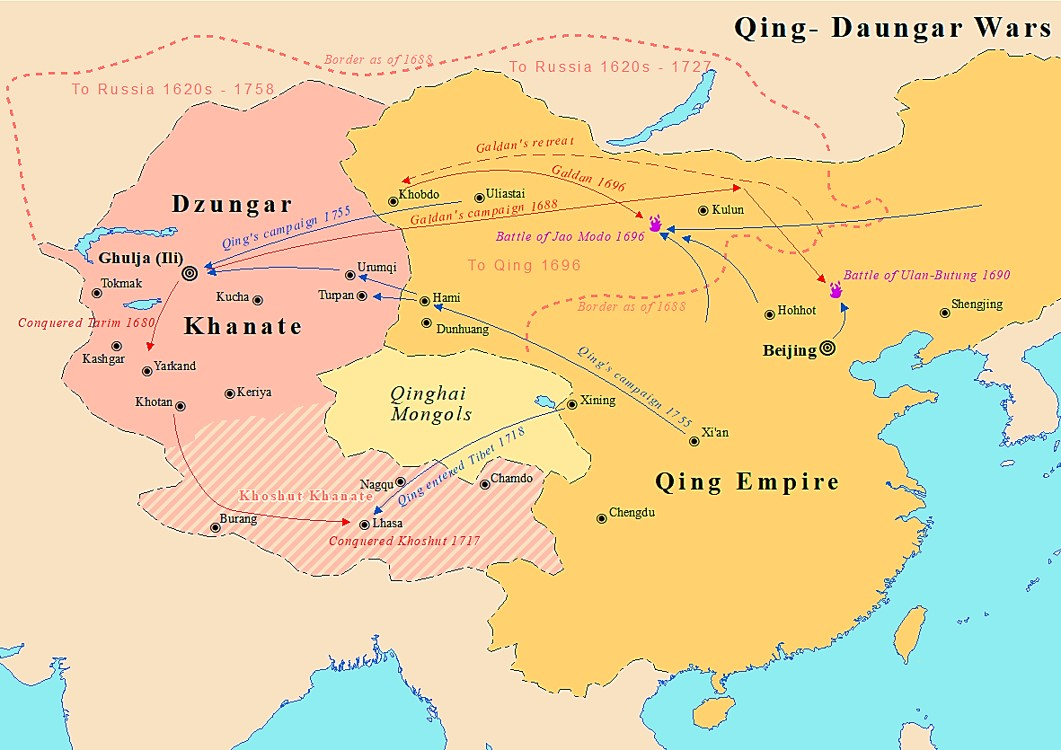
Dzungar–Qing War from 1688 to 1757

In the 17th century, the Dzungar pioneered the local manifestation of the 'Military Revolution' in central Eurasia after perfecting a process of manufacturing indigenously created gunpowder weapons. They also created a mixed agro-pastoral economy, as well as complementary mining and manufacturing industries on their lands. Additionally, the Zunghar managed to enact an empire-wide system of laws and policies to boost the use of the Oirat language in the region.

Some scholars estimate that about 80% of the Dzungar population was wiped out by warfare of the Manchu Qing conquest of Dzungaria in 1755–1757. The Zunghar population reached 600,000 in 1755.

Most of the Choros, Olot, Khoid, Baatud, and Zakhchin Oirats who battled against the Qing were killed by Manchu soldiers and, after the fall of the Dzungar Khanate, became small ethnic groups.

=== Kalmyks ===
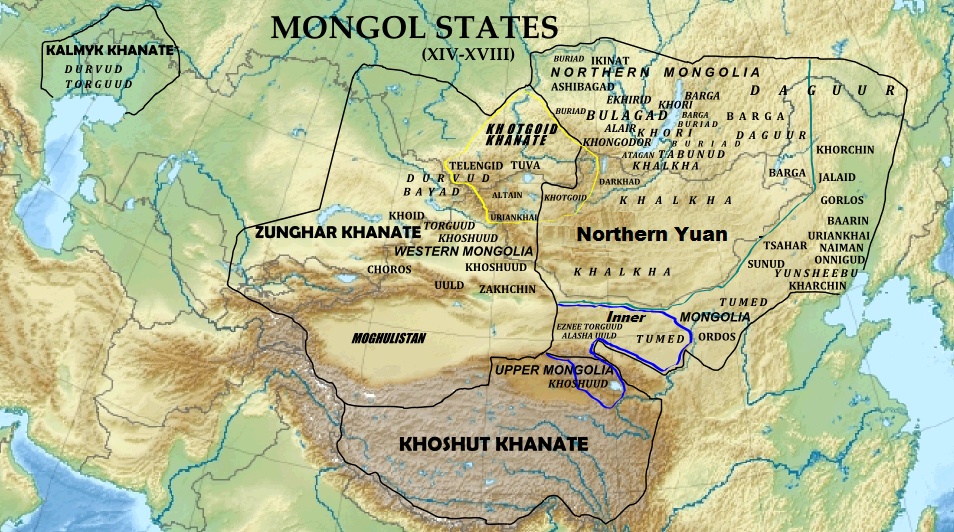
The Kalmyk Khanate (1630–1771), Dzungar Khanate (1634–1758), and Khoshut Khanate (1642–1717)

Kalmyks live on the Caspian steppe. Their settlement and relationship with the Caspian steppes has a long history.

In early modern times, Kho Orlok, tayishi of the Torghuts, and Dalai Tayishi of Dorbets, led the Oirats (200,000–250,000 people, mainly Torghuts) west to the Volga river in 1607 where they established the Kalmyk Khanate. By some accounts this move was precipitated by internal divisions or by the Khoshut tribe; other historians believe it more likely that the migrating clans were seeking pastureland for their herds, scarce in the central Asian highlands. Some of the Khoshut and Ölöt tribes joined the migration almost a century later. The Kalmyk migration had reached as far as the steppes of southeastern Europe by 1630. At the time, that area was inhabited by the Nogai Horde. But under pressure from Kalmyk warriors, the Nogais fled to Crimea and the Kuban River. Many other nomadic peoples in the Eurasian steppes subsequently became vassals of the Kalmyk Khanate, part of which is in the area of present-day Kalmykia.

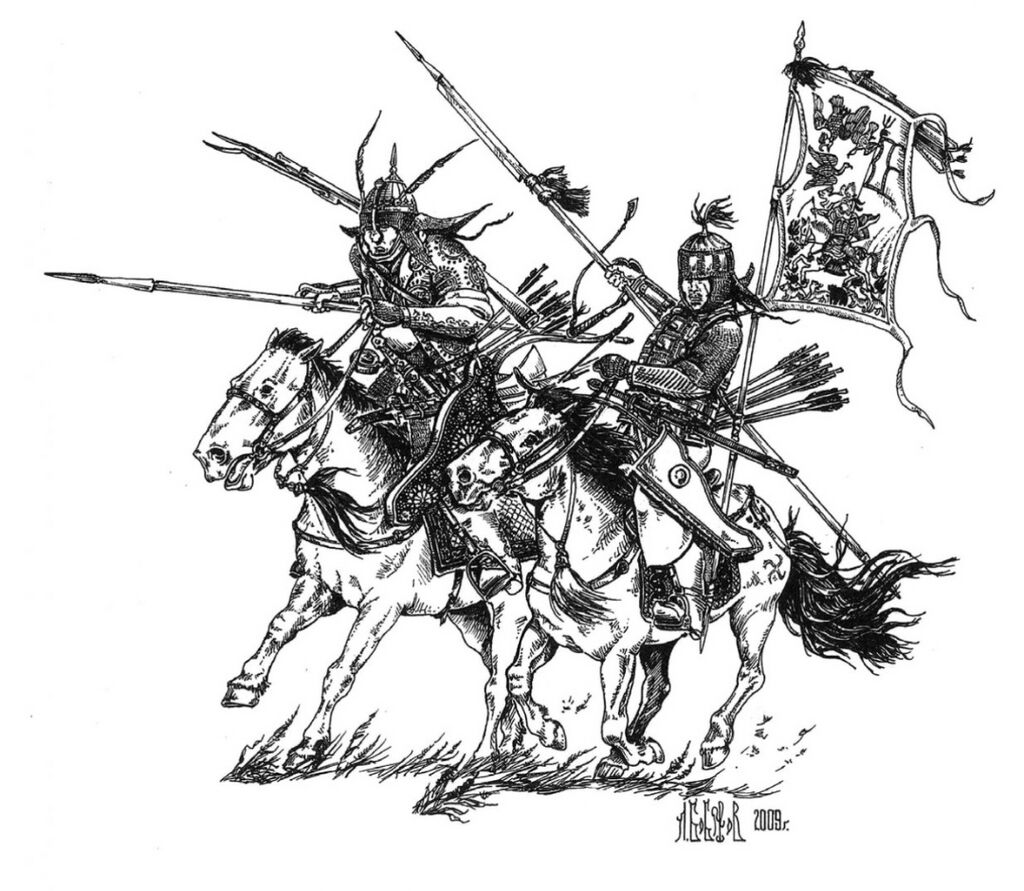
Kalmyk nobles in the 18th century

The Kalmyks became allies of Russia and a treaty to protect southern Russian borders was signed between the Kalmyk Khanate and Russia. Later, they became nominal, then full subjects of the Russian Tsar. In 1724, the Kalmyks came under the control of Russia. Russia gradually reduced the autonomy of the Kalmyk Khanate. Tsarist policies encouraged the establishment of Russian and German settlements on pastures where the Kalmyks formerly roamed and fed their livestock. The Russian Orthodox Church, by contrast, pressed Buddhist Kalmyks to adopt Orthodoxy. In January 1771, the oppression by the tsarist administration forced a larger part of Kalmyks (33,000 households or approximately 170,000 individuals) to migrate to Dzungaria.

200,000 (170,000) Kalmyks began the migration from their pastures on the left bank of the Volga River to Dzungaria, through the territories of their Bashkir and Kazakh enemies. The last Kalmyk khan Ubashi led the migration to restore the Dzungar Khanate and Mongolian independence. As C. D. Barkman notes, "It is quite clear that the Torghuts had not intended to surrender to the Chinese, but had hoped to lead an independent existence in Dzungaria". Ubashi Khan sent his 30,000 cavalry to the Russo-Turkish War in 1768–1769 to gain weapons before the migration. He led 170,000 Kalmyks on a return migration to Dzungaria, where they were received as Qing subjects; after failing to stop the Kalmyk migration, the Empress Catherine the Great abolished the Kalmyk Khanate. Beset by raids by Kazakhs and Bashkirs, thirst, cold and starvation, only 70,000 survivors made it to Dzungaria.

The Kazakhs attacked them near Balkhash Lake. About 100,000–150,000 Kalmyks who settled on the west bank of the Volga River could not cross the river because the river did not freeze in the winter of 1771 and Catherine the Great executed their influential nobles. After seven months of travel, only one third (66,073) of the original group reached Dzungaria (Balkhash Lake, western border of the Manchu Qing Empire). The Qing Empire resettled the Kalmyks in five different areas to prevent their revolt and several Kalmyk leaders were soon killed by the Manchus. Following the Russian revolution, their settlement was accelerated, Buddhism stamped out and herds collectivised.

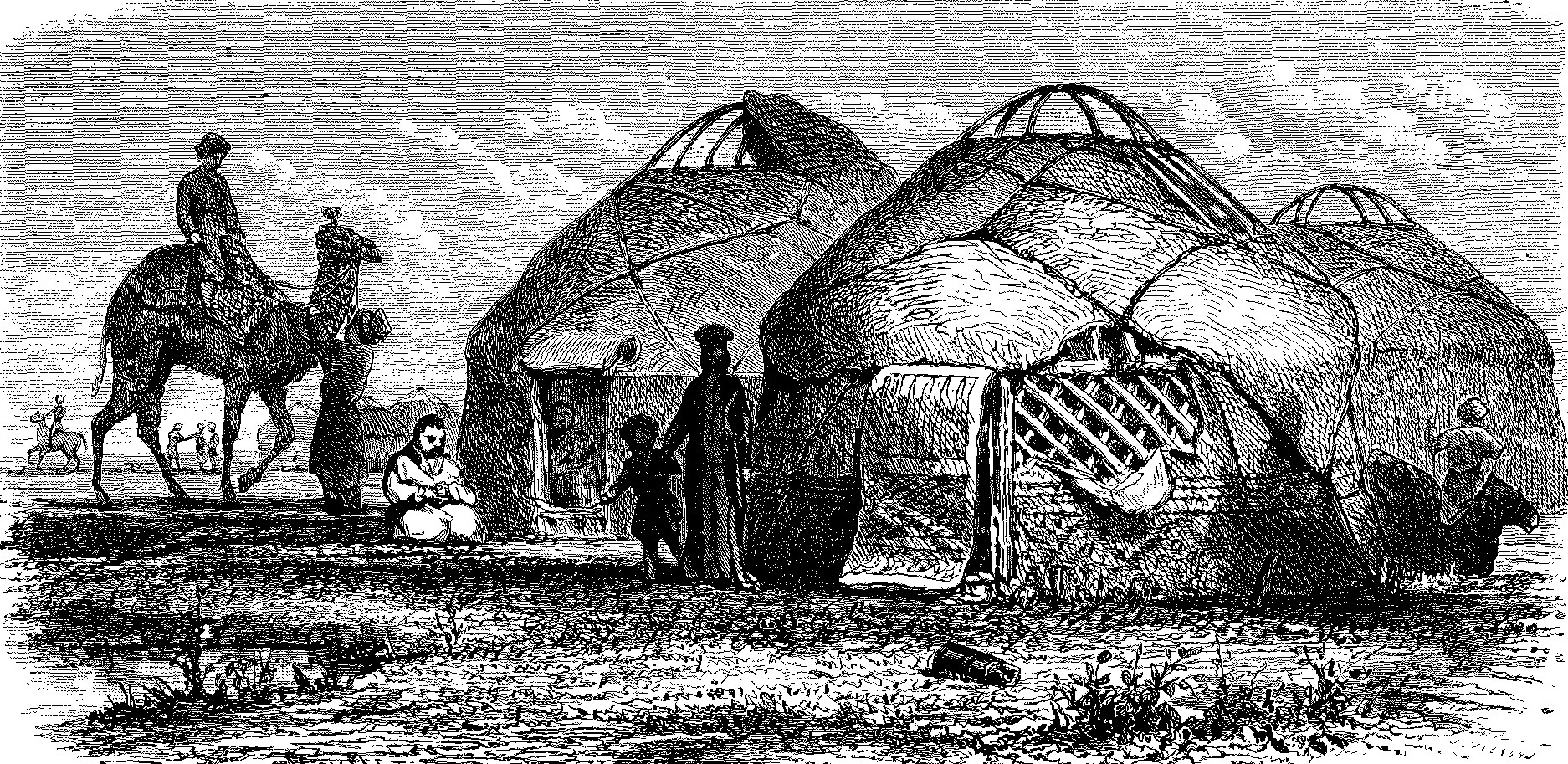
Kalmyks in the 19th century

Kalmykian nationalists and Pan-Mongolists attempted to migrate from Kalmykia to Mongolia in the 1920s when a serious famine gripped Kalmykia. On January 22, 1922, Mongolia proposed to accept the immigration of the Kalmyks, but the Russian government refused. Some 71–72,000 (around half of the population) Kalmyks died during the famine. The Kalmyks revolted against Russia in 1926, 1930 and 1942–1943. In March 1927, Soviets deported 20,000 Kalmyks to Siberia and Karelia. The Kalmyks founded the sovereign Republic of Oirat-Kalmyk on March 22, 1930. The Oirat state had a small army and 200 Kalmyk soldiers defeated a force of 1,700 Soviet soldiers in Durvud province of Kalmykia, but the Oirat state was destroyed by the Soviet Army later that year. The Mongolian government suggested accepting the Mongols of the Soviet Union, including Kalmyks, but the Soviets rejected the proposal.

In 1943, the entire population of 120,000 Kalmyks were deported to Siberia by Stalin, accused of supporting invading Axis armies attacking Stalingrad (Volgograd); a fifth of the population is thought to have perished during and immediately after the deportation. Around half (97–98,000) of the Kalmyk people deported to Siberia died before being allowed to return home in 1957. The government of the Soviet Union forbade teaching the Kalmyk language during the deportation. Mongolian leader Khorloogiin Choibalsan attempted to arrange migration of the deportees to Mongolia and he met them in Siberia during his visit to Russia. Under the Law of the Russian Federation of April 26, 1991 "On Rehabilitation of Exiled Peoples" repressions against Kalmyks and other peoples were qualified as an act of genocide.

According to the Russian 2010 Census there were 176,800 Kalmyks, of whom only 80,546 could speak the Kalmyk language, a serious decline from the level of the 2002 Census, in which the number of speakers was 153,602 (with a total number of 173,996 people). The Soviet 1989 Census showed 156,386 Kalmyk-speakers with a total number of 173,821 Kalmyks.

=== Xinjiang Mongols ===
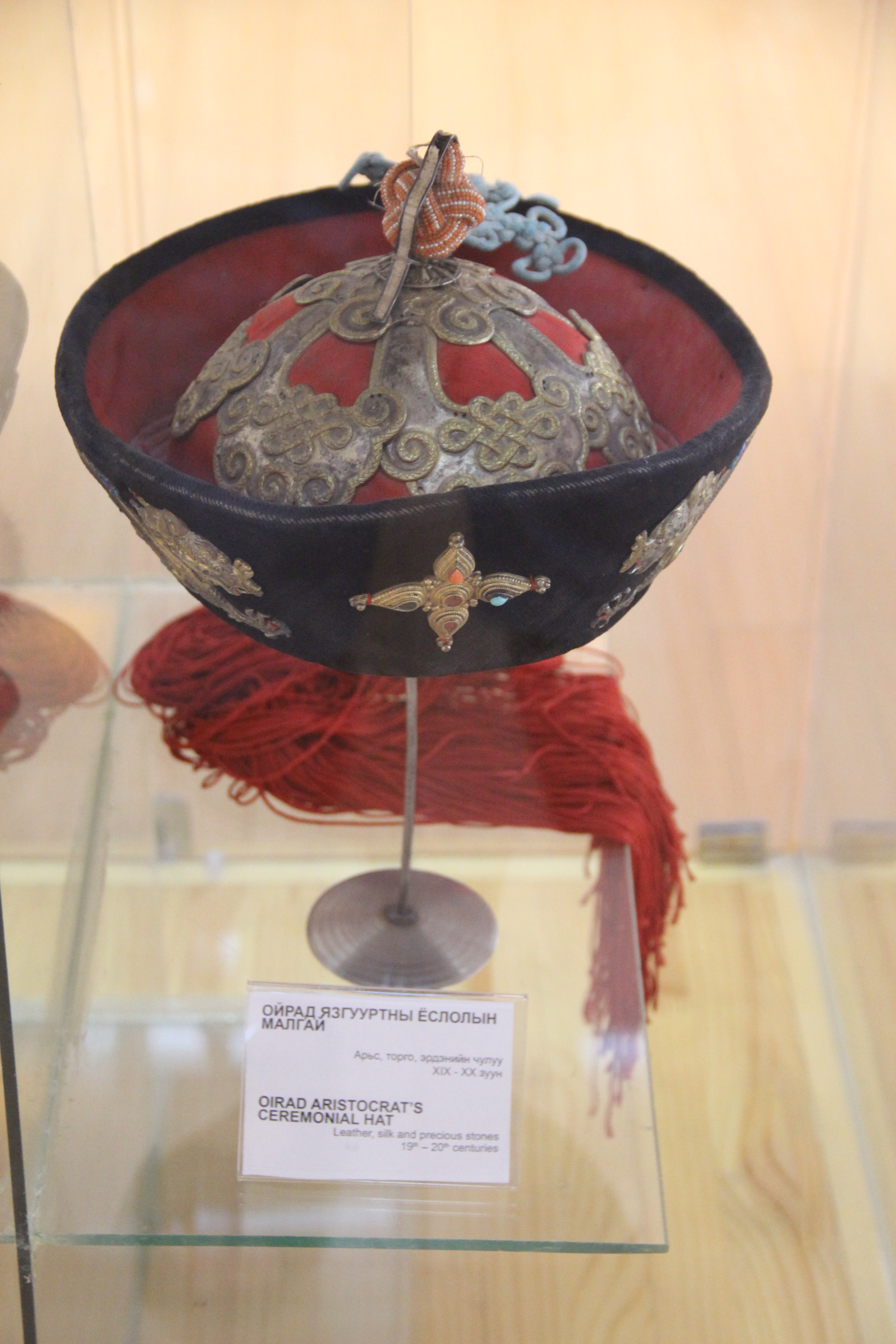
Oirat ceremonial hat

The Mongols of Xinjiang form a minority, principally in the northern part of the region, numbering 194,500 in 2010, about 50,000 of which are Dongxiangs. They are primarily descendants of the surviving Torghuts and Khoshuts who returned from Kalmykia, and of the Chakhar stationed there as garrison soldiers in the 18th century. The emperor had sent messages asking the Kalmyks to return, and erected a smaller copy of the Potala in Jehol (Chengde), (the country residence of the Manchu Emperors) to mark their arrival. A model copy of that "Little Potala" was made in China for the Swedish explorer Sven Hedin, and was erected at the World's Columbian Exposition in Chicago in 1893. It is now in storage in Sweden, where there are plans to re-erect it. Some of the returnees did not come that far and still live, now as Muslims, at the southwestern end of Lake Issyk-kul in present-day Kyrgyzstan.

In addition to exiling Han criminals to Xinjiang to be slaves of the Banner garrisons there, the Qing also practiced reverse exile, exiling Inner Asian (Mongol, Russian and Muslim criminals from Mongolia and Inner Asia) to China proper where they would serve as slaves in Han Banner garrisons in Guangzhou. Russian, Oirats and Muslims (Oros. Ulet. Hoise jergi weilengge niyalma) such as Yakov and Dmitri were exiled to the Han banner garrison in Guangzhou. In the 1780s after the Muslim rebellion in Gansu started by Zhang Wenqing (張文慶) was defeated, Muslims like Ma Jinlu (馬進祿) were exiled to the Han Banner garrison in Guangzhou to become slaves to Han Banner officers. The Qing code regulating Mongols in Mongolia sentenced Mongol criminals to exile and slavery under Han bannermen in Han Banner garrisons in China proper.

=== Alasha Mongols ===
The region bordering Gansu and west of the Irgay River is called Alxa or Alaša, Alshaa and Mongols who moved there are called Alasha Mongols.

Törbaih Güshi Khan's fourth son, Ayush, was opposed to the Khan's brother Baibagas. Ayush's eldest son is Batur Erkh Jonon Khoroli. After the battle between Galdan Boshigt Khan and Ochirtu Sechen Khan, Batur Erkh Jonon Khoroli moved to Tsaidam with his 10,000 households. The fifth Dalai Lama wanted land for them from the Qing government, thus in 1686, the Emperor permitted them to reside in Alasha.

In 1697, Alasha Mongols were administered in 'khoshuu' and 'sum' units. A khoshuu with eight sums was created, Batur Erkh Jonon Khoroli was appointed Beil (prince), and Alasha was thus a 'zasag-khoshuu'. Alasha was however, like an 'aimag' and never administered under a 'chuulgan'.

In 1707, when Batur Erkh Jonon Khoroli died, his son Abuu succeeded him. He was in Beijing from his youth, served as bodyguard of the Emperor, and a princess (of the Emperor) was given to him, thus making him a 'Khoshoi Tavnan', i.e. Emperor's groom. In 1793, Abuu became Jün Wang. There are several thousand Muslim Alasha Mongols.

==== Ejine Mongols ====
Mongols who lived along the Ejin River (Ruo Shui) descended from Rabjur, a grandson of Torghut Ayuka Khan from the Volga River.

In 1698, Rabjur, with his mother, younger sister and 500 people, went to Tibet to pray. While they were returning via Beijing in 1704, the Qing ruler, the Kangxi Emperor, let them stay there for some years and later organized a 'khoshuu' for them in a place called Sertei, and made Rabjur the governor.

In 1716, the Kangxi Emperor sent him and his people to Hami, near the border of Qing China and the Zunghar Khanate, for intelligence-gathering purposes against the Oirats. When Rabjur died, his eldest son, Denzen, succeeded him. He was afraid of the Zunghar and wanted the Qing government to allow them to move away from the border. They were settled in Dalan Uul–Altan. When Denzen died in 1740, his son Lubsan Darjaa succeeded him and became Beil.

In 1753, they were settled on the banks of the Ejin River and the Ejin River Torghut 'khoshuu' was thus formed.

== Origins and genetics ==
Haplogroup C2*-Star Cluster, which was thought to be carried by likely male-line descendants of Genghis Khan and of the Rouran, appears in 1.6% of Oirats. The Y-chromosome DNA in 426 individuals mainly from three major tribes of the Kalmyks (the Torghut, Dörbet and Khoshut) belonged to the following haplogroups: C-M48: 38.7%; C-M407: 10.8%; N1c: 10.1%; R2: 7.7%; O2: 6.8%; C2 (not M407, not M48): 6.6%; O1b: 5.2%; R1: 4.9%; Others: 9.2%. Haplogroup C2*-Star Cluster appeared in 2% (3% of Dörbet and 2.7% of the Torghut).

== Tribes ==
Sart Kalmyks and Xinjiang Oirats are not Volga Kalmyks or Kalmyks, and the Kalmyks are a subgroup of the Oirats.

- Altai Uriankhai
- Baatud
- Bayads
- Buzava
- Chantuu
- Choros
- Dorbet
- Dzungar
- Khoshut
- Khoid
- Kalmak
- Myangad
- Olots
- Oirots
- Sart Kalmyks
- Torghut
- Tumed
- Zakhchin
- Volga Kalmyks

== See also ==
- Demographics of Mongolia
- Four Oirats
- Kalmyk people
- Dzungar
- Kalmykia
- Altay people
- Al-Adil Kitbugha (Oirat Sultan of Egypt)

== Sources ==
- Minahan, James B. (10 February 2014). "Oirat". Ethnic Groups of North, East, and Central Asia: An Encyclopedia. Bloomsbury Publishing USA. pp. 209–211. ISBN 978-1-61069-018-8.
- West, Barbara A. (19 May 2010). "Oirat". Encyclopedia of the Peoples of Asia and Oceania. Infobase Publishing. pp. 606–607. ISBN 978-1-4381-1913-7.
