= Kho Orluk =

Founder of the Kalmyk Khanate of Oirat Mongols

- Taishi
- Successor: Shukhur Daichin
- Born: 1580; Western Mongolia
- Died: 1644 (aged 63–64); Kabardia
Names
- Kho Orluk
- Khanate: Kalmyk Khanate

Kho Orluk (Mongolian: Хо Өрлөг; 1580-1644) was an Oirat prince and Taishi of the Torghut-Oirat tribe. Around 1616, Kho Orluk persuaded the other Torghut princes and lesser nobility to move their tribe en masse westward through southern Siberia and southward along the Emba River to the grass steppes north of the Russian garrison at Astrakhan. During the process of securing the steppes for his people, Kho Orluk met limited resistance from the local Muslim tribesman, therefore setting the foundation of what later became known as the Kalmyk Khanate.

In 1620 his daughter married Ishim Khan (son of Kuchum, Khan of Sibir).
