= Torghut =

Subgroup of the Mongols

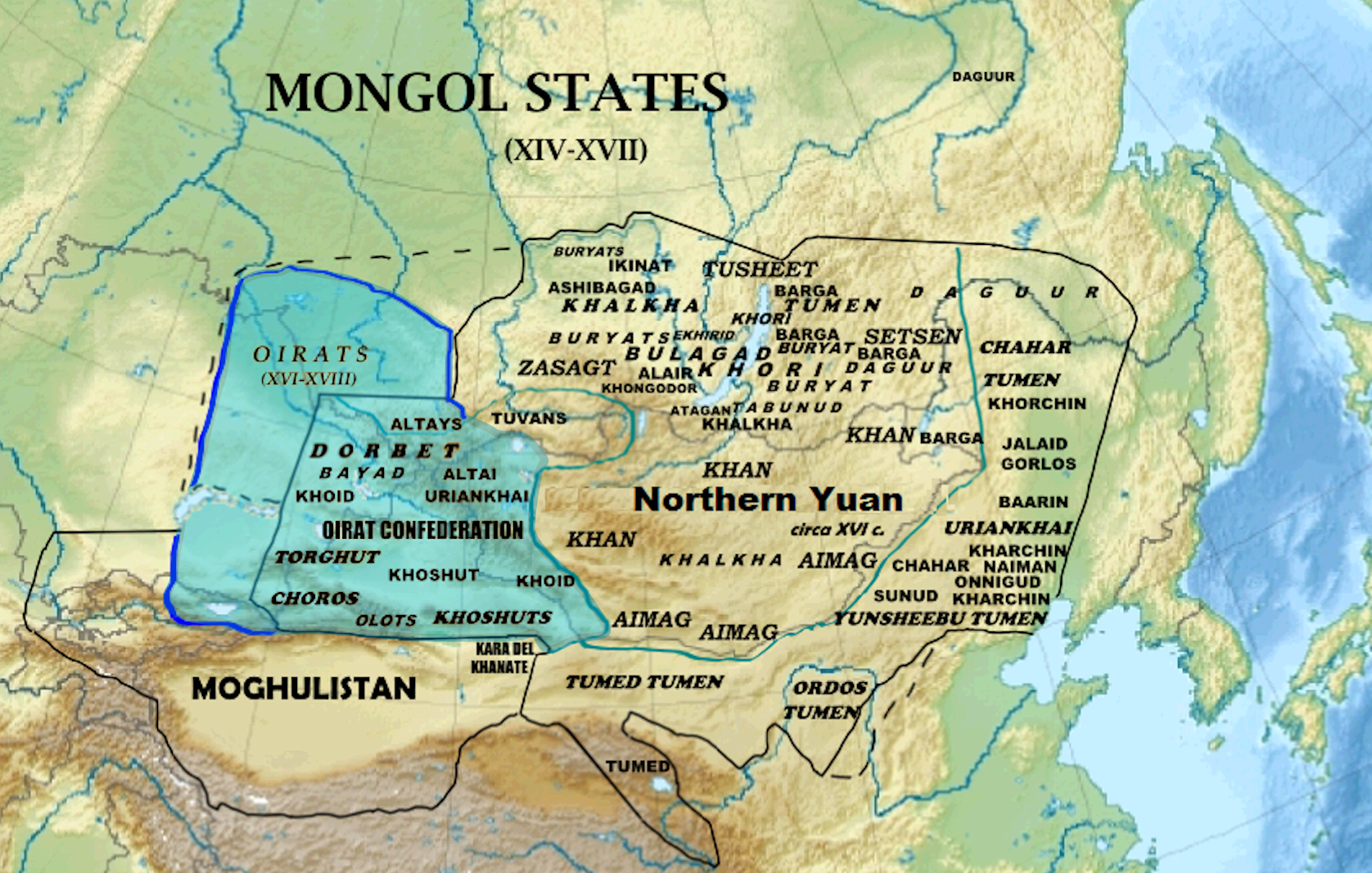
- Location of Torghut in the Oirat Confederation

Total population
- 202,000

Regions with significant populations
- China: 106,000
- Russia: 82,500
- Mongolia: 14,176

Languages
- Torgut dialect of Oirat

Religion
- Tibetan Buddhism, Mongolian shamanism

Related ethnic groups
- Mongols, especially Oirats

The Torghut (Mongolian: Торгууд, ᠲᠤᠷᠭᠣᠣᠠ, Torguud, "Guardsman", simplified Chinese: 土尔扈特; traditional Chinese: 土爾扈特) are one of the four major subgroups of the Four Oirats. The Torghut nobles traced their descent to the Turco-Mongol Keraite ruler Toghrul, and many Torghuts descended from the Keraites. They are scattered in the provinces of Xinjiang (China), Kalmykia (Russia) and Khovd (Mongolia).

== History ==
They might have been kheshigs of the Great Khans before Kublai Khan. The Torghut clan first appeared as an Oirat group in the mid-16th century. After the collapse of the Four Oirat Alliance, the majority of the Torghuts under Kho Orluk separated from other Oirat groups and moved west to the Volga region in 1630, forming the core of the Kalmyks. A few Torghut nobles followed Toro Baikhu Gushi Khan to Qinghai Lake (Koke Nuur), becoming part of the so-called Upper Mongols. In 1698, 500 Torghuts went on pilgrimage to Tibet but were unable to return. Hence, they were resettled in Ejin River by the Kangxi Emperor of China's Qing dynasty. In 1699, 15,000 Torghut households returned from the Volga region to Dzungaria where they joined the Khoits. After the fall of the Dzungar Khanate, one of their princes, Taiji Shyiren, fled west to the Volga region with 10,000 families in 1758. The name Torghut or Torgut probably derives from the Mongolian word "torog" meaning literally "silk".

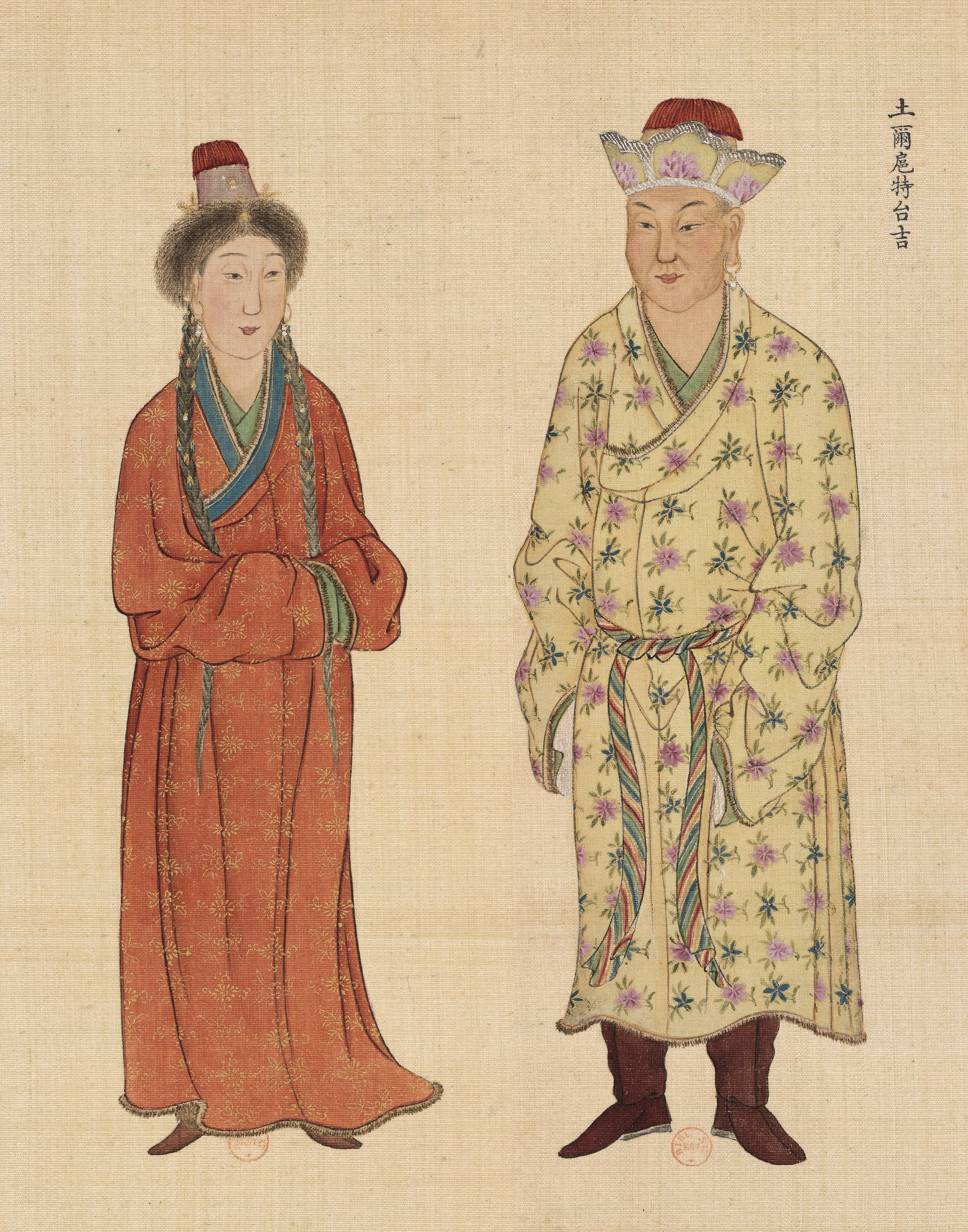
Tayiji (prince) of the Torghuts and his wife (土爾扈特台吉). Huang Qing Zhigong Tu, 1769

Due to harsh treatment by Russian governors, most Torghuts eventually migrated back to Dzungaria and western Mongolia, departing en masse on January 5, 1771, about that event there is a lively narrative by Thomas De Quincey, written in 1837. While the first phase of their movement became the Old Torghuts, the Qing called the later Torghut immigrants "New Torghut". The size of the departing group has been variously estimated between 150,000 and 400,000 people, with perhaps as many as six million animals (cattle, sheep, horses, camels and dogs). Beset by raids, thirst and starvation, approximately 85,000 survivors made it to Dzungaria, where they settled near the Ejin River with the permission of the Qing Emperor. The Torghuts were coerced by the Qing into giving up their nomadic lifestyle and to take up sedentary agriculture instead as part of a deliberate policy by the Qing to enfeeble them.

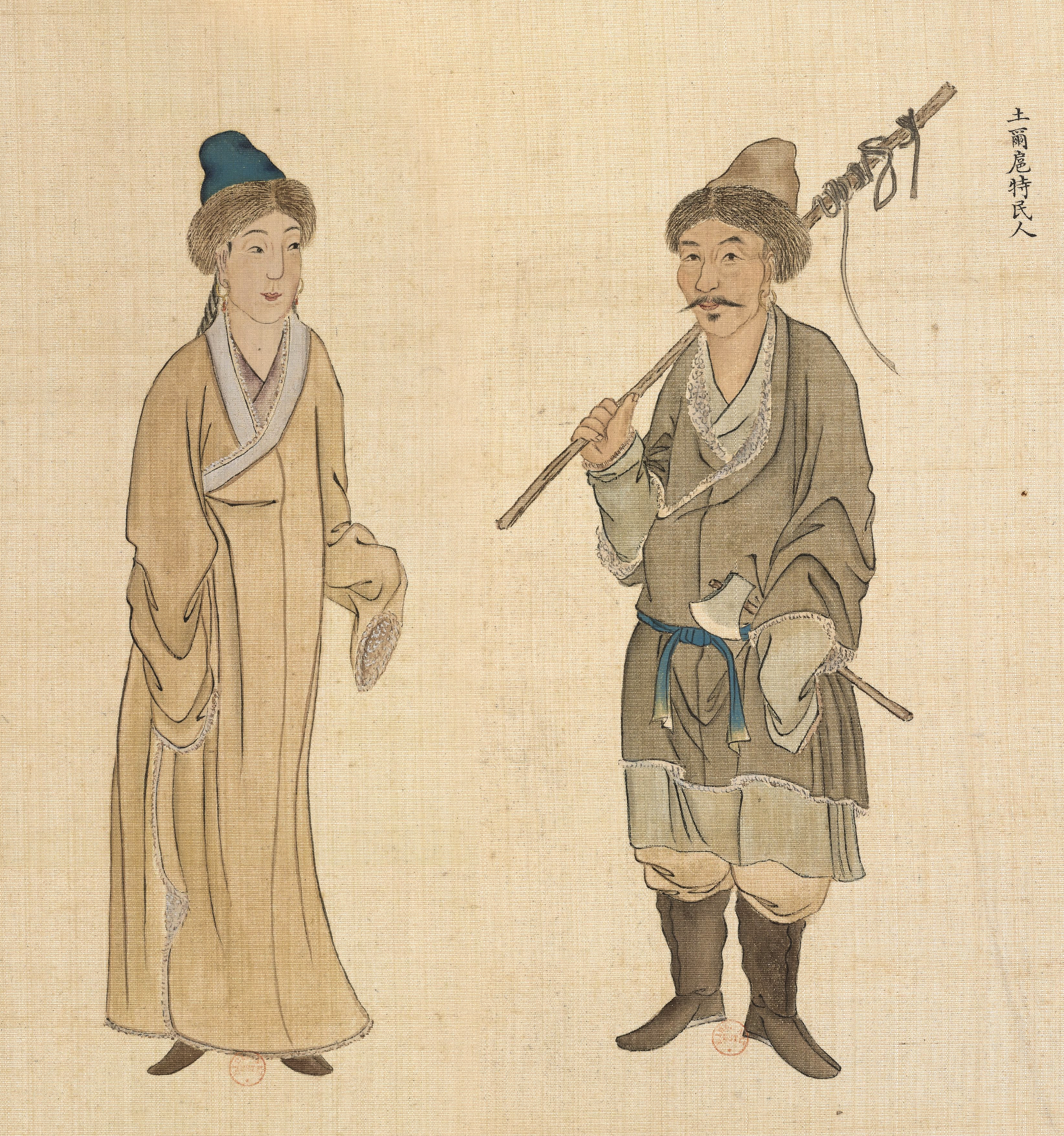
Torghut commoners (土爾扈特民人). Huang Qing Zhigong Tu, 1769

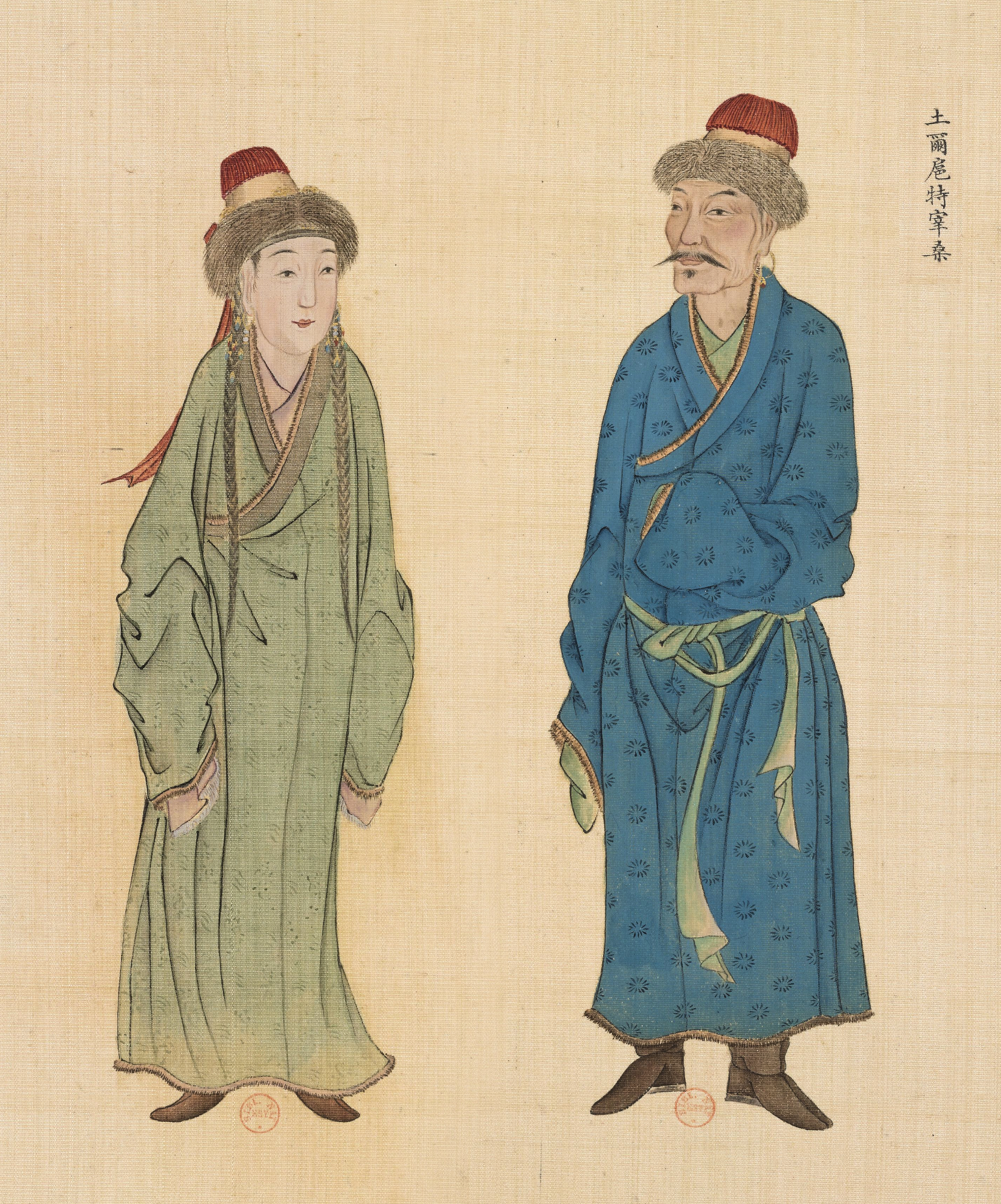
Zaisang (ǰayisang, high minister) of the Torghuts and his wife (土爾扈特宰桑). Huang Qing Zhigong Tu, 1769

A group of around 70,000 Torghuts was left behind in Russia, since (according to legend) the Volga River was not frozen and they could not cross it to join their comrades. This group became known as the Kalmyk, or "remnant", although the name may predate these events. However, Muslims called the Kalmyks before. In any case, the remnant population doubles their numbers by 1930. Torghut-Kalmyk archers under the command of the notable Russian general Mikhail Kutuzov clashed with the French army of Napoleon in 1812.

In 1906, the Qing put western Mongolia's New Torghuts under the Altai district. One New Torghut prince opposed independence in Mongolia and fled to Xinjiang in 1911–12. However, the others were reincorporated into Mongolia's far western Khovd Province. Torghut forces assisted the Russians in the Soviet Invasion of Xinjiang.

An exhibition in memorial to the Torghut exodus from the Volga to the Qing Empire is found at the Potala Palace, Chengde.

== Modern notable Torghuts in Mongolia ==
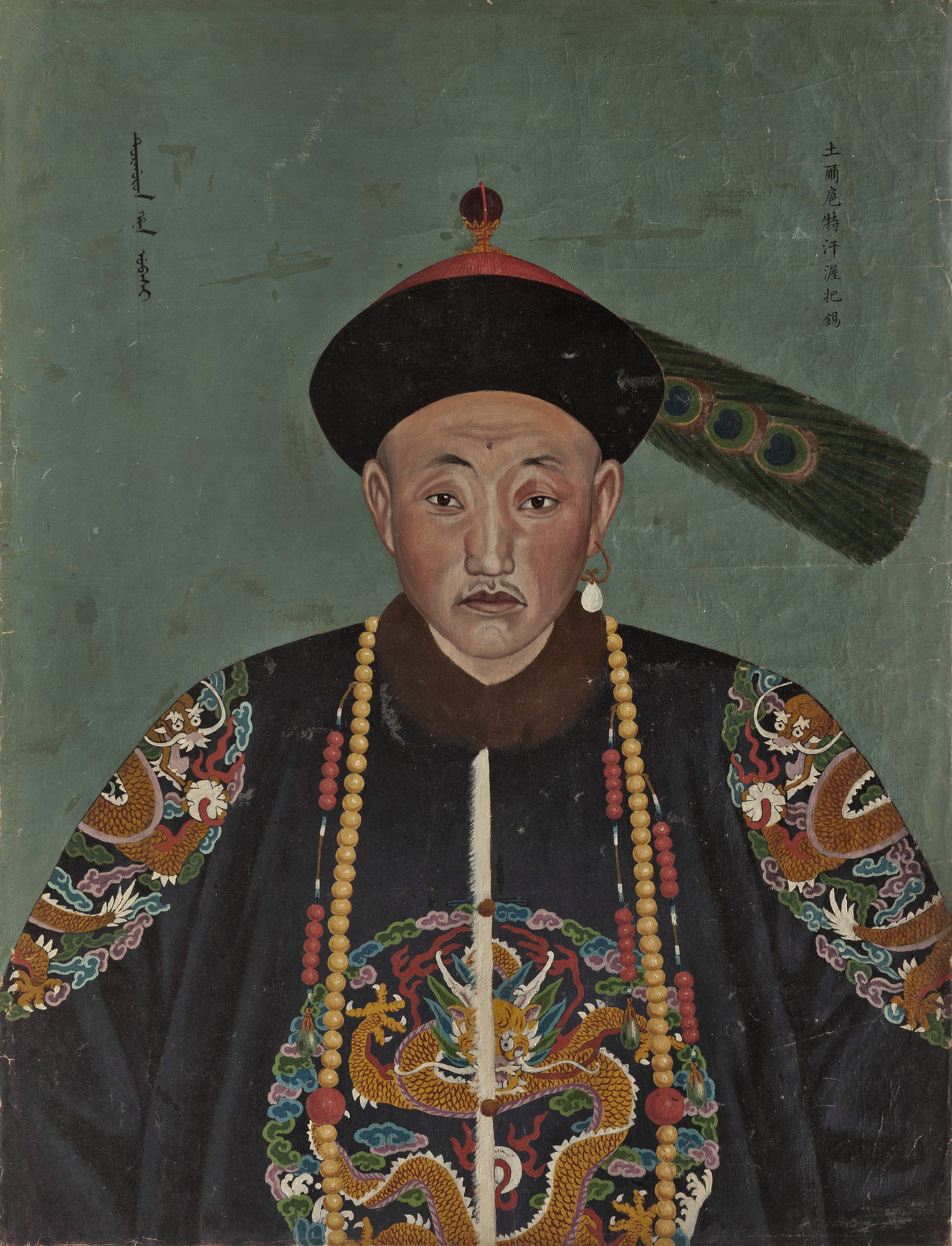
Ubashi Khan (1744–1774), the Torghut ruler of the Kalmyk Khanate, in Qing dynasty costume (紫光阁功臣像 collection).

- Shiileg, a hero of Mongolia
- Badam, a hero of Mongolia
- Purevjal, a famous Mongolian singer
- Luvsan, a hero of Labor of Mongolia
- Otgontsagaan, a hero of Labor of Mongolia
- Batlai, a hero of Labor of Mongolia
- Tuvshin, a hero of Labor of Mongolia
- Baadai, a hero of Labor of Mongolia
