= Ubashi Khan =

Khan of the Kalmyk Khanate (r. 1761–1771)

Ubashi Khan ᠣᠪᠠᠱᠢ ᠬᠠᠨ
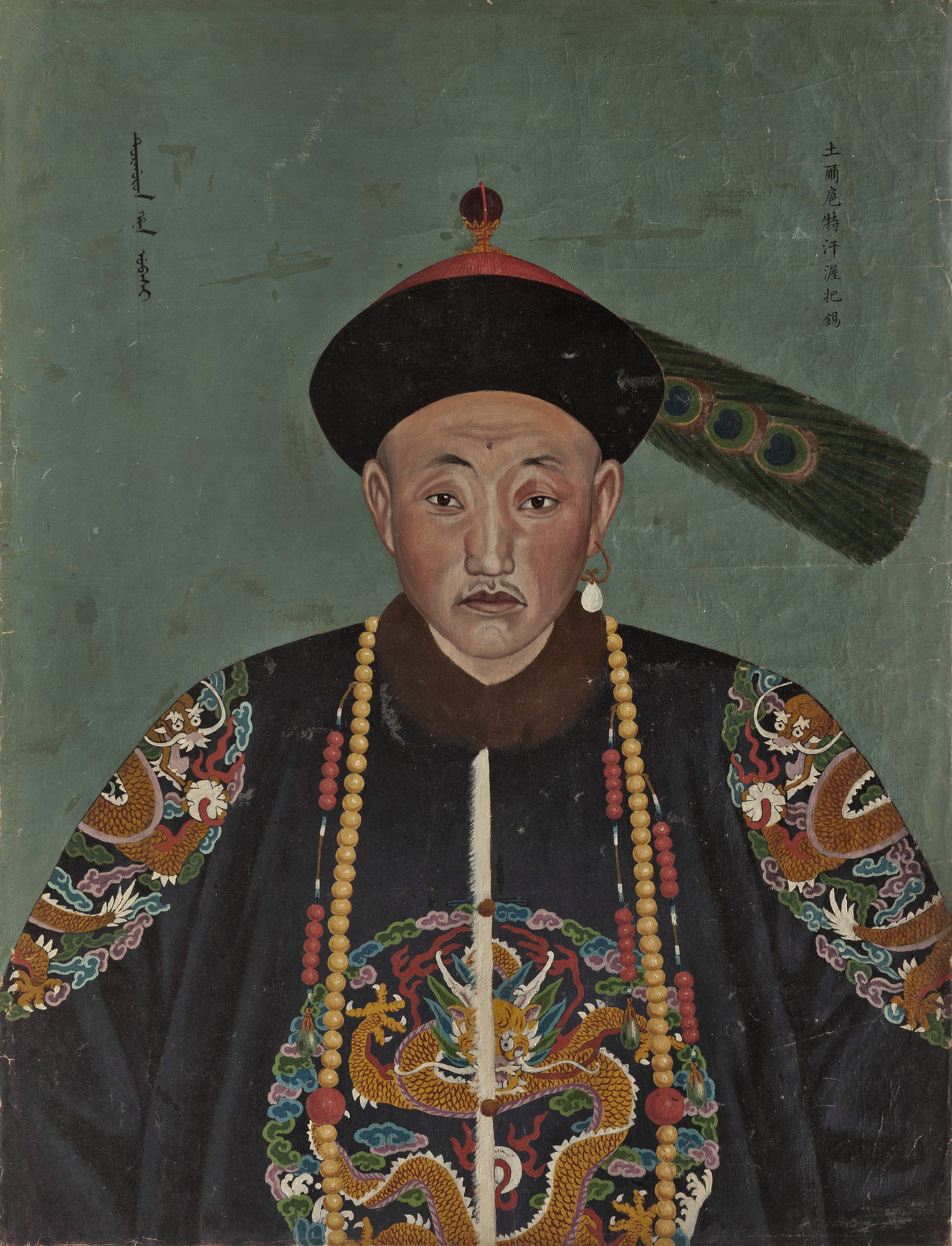
- Ubashi Khan (1744–1774), the Torghut ruler of the Kalmyk Khanate, in Qing dynasty costume (collection in Ziguangge, Zhongnanhai)

Khan of the Kalmyk Khanate
- Reign: 1761 – 1771
- Predecessor: Donduk Dashi Khan
- Born: 1744; Kalmyk Khanate
- Died: 1774 (aged 29–30); Beijing, Qing dynasty

Ubashi Khan (Mongolian: ᠣᠪᠠᠱᠢ ᠬᠠᠨ; Chinese: 渥巴锡汗; (Note: Also misspelled as 幄巴西) 1744 – 1774) was a Torghut-Kalmyk prince and the last Khan of the Kalmyk Khanate. In January 1771, he led the return migration of the majority of the Kalmyk people from the Kalmyk steppe to Dzungaria, their ancestral homeland, then under the control of the Qing dynasty.

== Biography ==
Ubashi Khan was the great-grandson of Ayuka Khan. When he decided to return his people to Dzungaria, the Dalai Lama was contacted to request his blessing and to set the date of departure. After consulting the astrological chart, the Dalai Lama set the return date, but at the moment of departure, the weakening of the ice on the Volga River permitted only those Kalmyks who roamed on the left or eastern bank to leave. Those on the right bank were forced to stay behind.

Under Ubashi Khan's leadership, Kalmyks began the journey from their pastures on the left bank of the Volga River to Dzungaria. Approximately five-sixths of the Torghut tribe followed Ubashi Khan. Most of the Khoshuts, Choros and Khoits also accompanied the Torghuts on their journey to Dzungaria. The Dörbet tribe, by contrast, elected not to go at all. The Kalmyks who resettled in Qing territory became known as Torghuts. While the first phase of their movement became the Old Torghuts, the Qing called the later Torghut immigrants "New Torghut". The size of the departing group has been variously estimated between 140,000 and 170,000 people, with perhaps as many as six million animals (cattle, sheep, horses, camels and dogs). Beset by raids, thirst and starvation, approximately 85,000 survivors made it to Dzungaria, where they settled near the Ejin River with the permission of the Qing Manchu Emperor. The Torghuts were coerced by the Qing into giving up their nomadic lifestyle and to take up sedentary agriculture instead as part of a deliberate policy by the Qing to enfeeble them. They proved to be incompetent farmers and they became destitute, selling their children into slavery, engaging in prostitution, and stealing, according to the Manchu Qi-yi-shi. Child slaves were in demand on the Central Asian slave market, and Torghut children were sold into this slave trade.

After failing to stop the flight, Catherine the Great abolished the Kalmyk Khanate, and the title of Khan, making Ubashi Khan the last to hold this title.

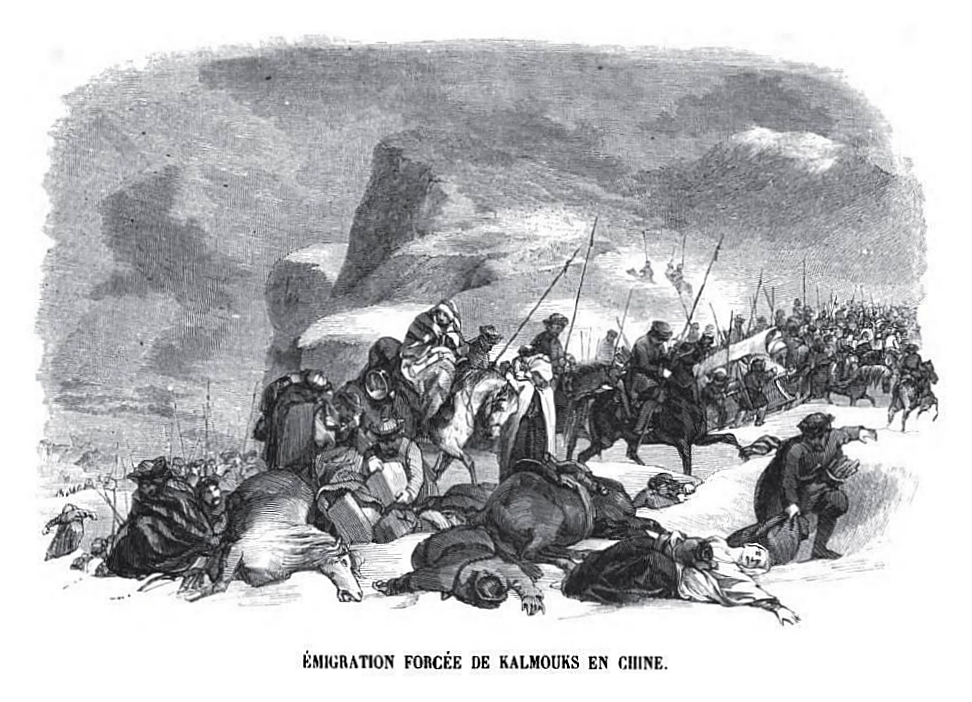
"Exodus of 500.000 Kalmyks to China in 1771", led by Ubashi Khan. Engraving by Charles Michel Geoffroy.

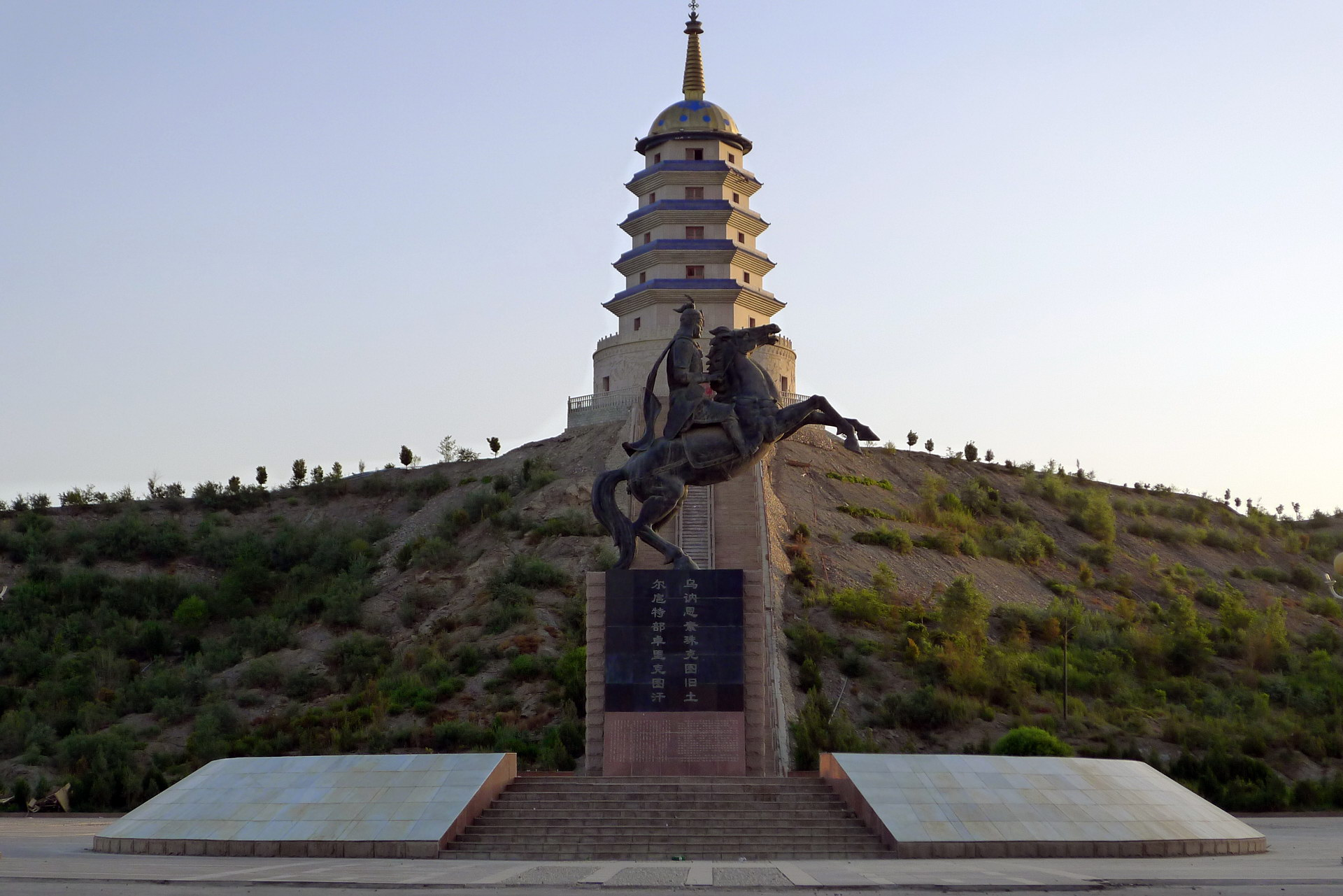
Monument to the return of the Torghut in Korla, Xinjiang. Statue of Ubashi Khan in the front and the memorial tower in the back.
