= Balingiin Tserendorj =

Mongolian politician (1868–1928)

Balingiin Tserendorj Балингийн Цэрэндорж
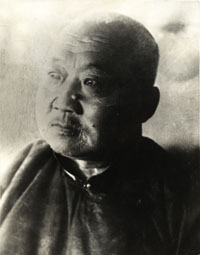

6th Prime Minister of Mongolia
- In office 18 September 1923 – 13 February 1928
- Preceded by: Jalkhanz Khutagt Sodnomyn Damdinbazar
- Succeeded by: Anandyn Amar

Acting Head of State
- In office 20 May 1924 – 26 November 1924
- Preceded by: Bogd Khan (as Khagan)
- Succeeded by: Navaandorjiin Jadambaa (as Chairman of the State Great Khural)

Personal details
- Born: 25 May 1868 Tüsheetu Khan aimag, Qing Empire (now Khentii Province, Mongolia)
- Died: 13 February 1928 (aged 59) Ulaanbaatar, Mongolian People’s Republic

Balingiin Tserendorj (Note: Mongolian: Балингийн Цэрэндорж, pronounced [paɮɪŋkíːɴ t͡sʰe̝rəntɔ́rt͡ɕ]) (25 May 1868 – 13 February 1928), known by his titles Khicheengüi Said (Note: Mongolian: Хичээнгүй Сайд, pronounced [xit͡ɕʰéːŋkuɪ̯ sɛːt]; lit. 'Earnest Minister') and Khicheengüi Gün, (Note: Mongolian: Хичээнгүй Гүн, pronounced [xit͡ɕʰéːŋkuɪ̯ kuɴ]; lit. 'Diligent Duke') was a prominent Mongolian political figure of the early 20th century who served as the first Prime Minister of the Mongolian People's Republic from 1924 until his death in 1928. Between 1913 and 1924 he held several high-ranking positions within a succession of Mongolian governments including; the Bogd Khaanate (1911–1924), the Chinese occupation (1919–1921), and the puppet regime under Roman Ungern von Sternberg (1921).

== Early life and career ==
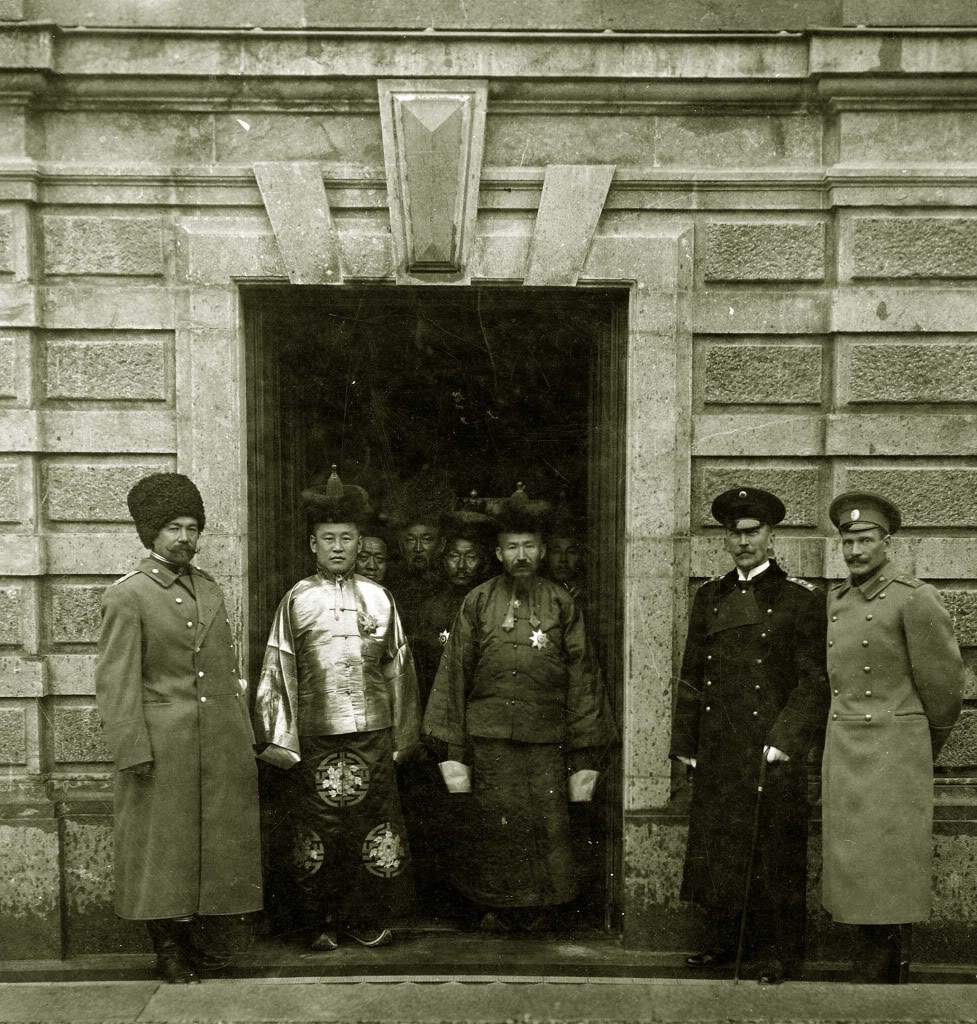
Tseredorj was part of Prime Minister Namnansüren's delegation to St. Petersburg to negotiate the Kyakhta treaty

Tserendorj was born in 1868 as a subject to the Great Shabi (the estate of the personal retainers of the Jebtsundamba Khutuktu) in Kherlen Bayan Ulaan in present-day Khentii Province. He spoke Mongolian, Manchu, Chinese and Russian and worked as a scribe and translator in the local Manchu litigation office from 1885 to 1911. After the establishment of the Bogd Khaanate in 1911, Tserendorj joined the Foreign Ministry of Autonomous Mongolia where he rose to become deputy foreign minister in 1913 and then minister of foreign affairs.

== Bogd Khaganate of Mongolia 1911–1924 ==
=== Mongolian-Russian Conferences 1912–1915 ===
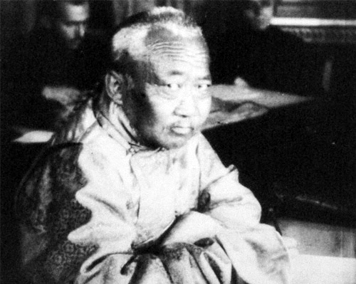
Prime Minister Tserendorj

As under previous governments, Tserendorj's primary goal was to secure broader international recognition of Mongolia's independence. In October 1912, Tserendorj was one of three men appointed to write a final draft for a Russo-Mongolian Friendship Agreement, signed in Urga on October 21, 1912. In exchange for Russia helping Mongolia maintain its independence, Mongolia agreed to give special privileges to Russian civilians and trade, and to consult Russia before concluding agreements with other countries.

In January 1913, Tserendorj was part of the "Mongolian Embassy" delegation (consisting of Minister of Foreign Affairs Van Khanddorj, the Deputy Prime Minister Beis Shirnendamdin, Deputy Minister Tserendorj, and Secretary Bavuudorj from the Foreign Ministry) sent to Russia by the Bogd Khaganate to negotiate the establishment of a Mongolian embassy in St. Petersburg (which Russia refused), the purchase of weapons and military training, and the issuing of a reproval by Russia to the Chinese government to end hostilities towards Mongolia. On January 24, 1913, Tsar Nicholas II received the delegation at Tsarskoye Selo Palace, with the Imperial Russian government awarding honors to the delegates. Tserendorj was awarded the Order of Saint Stanislaus (2nd class).

From 1914 to 1915, Tserendorj accompanied Prime Minister Tögs-Ochiryn Namnansüren as part of the Mongolian delegation to the 8-month long Kyakhta treaty conference between Czarist Russia and the Republic of China that sought to clarify, among other things, the Russian-Chinese border in East Asia and Mongolia's geopolitical status. Ultimately, Mongolian hopes for international recognition of its independence were dashed when Russia and China agreed that Mongolia was an autonomous region within China. Although the agreement failed to secure Moscow's firm recognition of Mongolia's independence from Chinese rule, Moscow did, however, recognize the Mongolian People's government as "the sole legitimate government" of the Mongolian people.

=== Chinese occupation ===
Tserendorj maintained his position as Minister of Foreign Affairs after the occupation of Niislel Khüree (present day Ulaanbaatar) by troops under the Chinese warlord Xu Shuzheng in late 1919. Xu installed a dictatorial regime, imprisoned leaders of Mongolia's independence movement such as Khatanbaatar Magsarjav and Manlaibaatar Damdinsüren, and placed the Bogd Khan under house arrest. In the face of Chinese threats to exile the Bogd Khan, Tserendorj, Prime Minister Gonchigjalzangiin Badamdorj and the Bogd Khan acquiesced and signed a document "voluntarily" abdicating Mongolia's autonomy to Chinese rule. Although Badamdorj's career and reputation suffered irreparable damage as a result of his caving to Chinese pressure, Tserendorj escaped blame despite reports from the first American Consul in Kalgan, Samuel Sokobin, that Tserendorj had opted for reconciliation with the Chinese if negotiations could not produce independence.

=== Restoration of the Mongolian Government by Baron Ungern ===
Tserendorj continued to work within the government even after forces commanded by "The Mad Baron" Roman von Ungern-Sternberg ejected a Chinese occupation in February 1921. Ungern, an anti-Bolshevik warlord whose forces invaded Mongolia during the Russian Civil War, entered Mongolia in late 1920 with the intent of freeing the Bogd Khan from Chinese domination and establishing a new Mongolian Empire. Tserendorj made up part of his short-lived puppet government that lasted until July 11, 1921 when Mongolian partisans (commanded by Damdin Sükhbaatar) and Red Army units defeated Ungern's forces and recaptured the Mongolian capital. Tserendorj was named Deputy Minister of Foreign Affairs in the newly proclaimed revolutionary government headed by Prime Minister Dogsomyn Bodoo.

=== 1921 Treaty with the Soviet Union ===
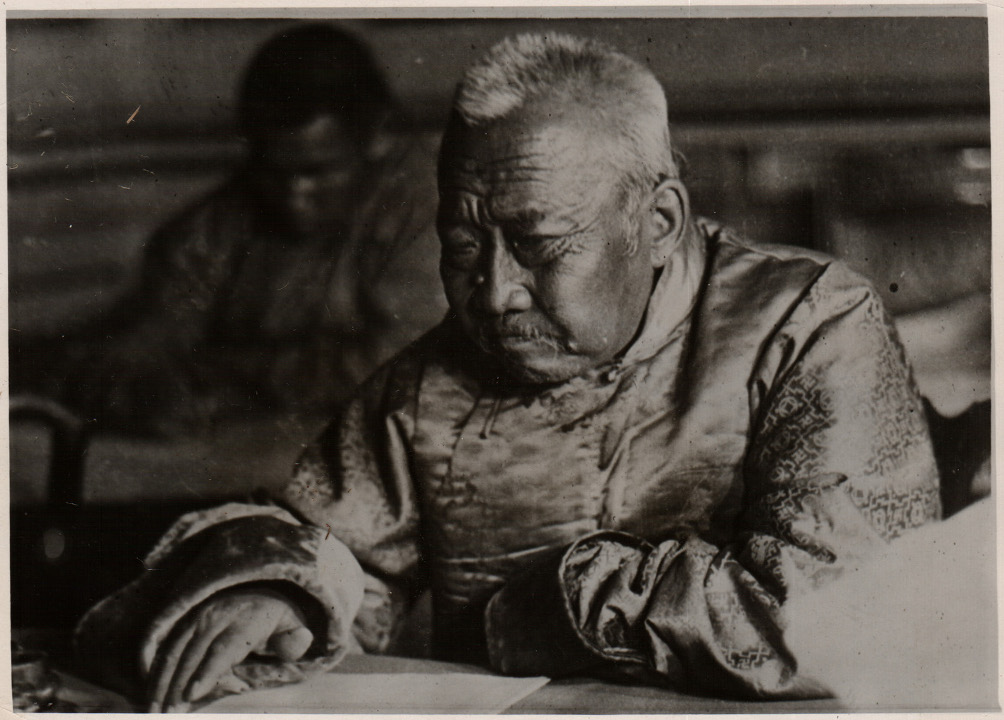
Tserendorj Signs Pact 1921

Following the Russian October Revolution of 1917, and the declaration of the Mongolian People's Republic in 1921, the Kyakhta Treaty became moot. In 1921, a group of high-ranking Mongolians that included Damdin Sükhbaatar and Tserendorj traveled to the Soviet Union to initiate Soviet-Mongolia friendship talks. There they both allegedly met with Vladimir Lenin. The resulting Friendship Treaty (signed November 5, 1921) formally established relations between the two countries and the exchange of Ambassadors. News articles from 1921 show Tserendorj "photographed in Moscow while signing a pact with the Russian Soviet Government opening diplomatic relations between the new revolutionary republic of Mongolia and Russia, Tsiben Dargi headed the Mongolian delegation.";

== International reputation ==
During this period, Tserendorj slowly gained an international reputation as one of Mongolian's most pragmatic, durable, and widely respected government leaders. A Russian participant to the Soviet-Mongolian friendship talks noted "he is an old Mongolian official…a prose writer, a poet and knows Mongolian and Chinese. Without him no legal or foreign affairs document is drafted." Later, Samuel Sokobin, the U.S. Consul to Kalgan who traveled to Mongolia in 1924, reported that Tserendorj was "highly intelligent, head and shoulders above his colleagues in common sense and a man who exercised a restraining influence on other members of the government".

Swedish missionary and friend, Frans August Larson, described Tserendorj in his book Larson, Duke of Mongolia as

the most outstanding personality among the Mongolian nobles that I have known...He was for the last twenty years of his life the ruling spirit of North Mongolia...He was simple and hard- working. His character was so without blemish that he was asked to serve through all the political changes that have taken place in the Mongolian Government...He was an intelligent conversationalist on many matters, and well read in the customs and the habits of other peoples and other countries. Although he had immeasurable power, -for he decided almost every question of great importance that came up during twenty years, -he lived and dressed simply...He was one of the great men of the world. Other men- wealthy nobles and high lamas- came to call on him humbly, because they knew that although he was not surrounded by material wealth he had a spirit which enriched men who came near him.

== Prime minister 1923–1928 ==
From 1922 to 1923 Tserendorj served as Minister of Foreign Affairs. He was appointed prime minister upon the death of Sodnomyn Damdinbazar on September 18, 1923 and was elected to the Presidium (or Politburo) of the Mongolian People's Revolutionary Party (MPRP) Central Committee. After the death of the Bogd Khan in April 1924, Tserendorj was made head of the draft constitution commission established by the government after a previous commission had "made wrong turns" by incorporating European and international law concepts. Pressured by the Soviets, his commission produced a ready-made, pre-approved constitution within one day of its first meeting. The new constitution disposed of the limited monarchy altogether and formally established the Mongolian People's Republic (MPR).

During the first session of the Mongolian Great Hural (parliament) in 1924, Tserendorj was appointed first prime minister of the MPR and was subsequently re-elected in 1926 and 1927. It was during this first session of parliament that Tserendorj took notice of an obscure delegate from Övörkhangai, Peljidiin Genden, and suggested he be appointed head of the Small Hural, the small assembly that controlled day-to-day matters of state Genden would later be prime minister during a critical period in Mongolian history.

=== Soviet control increases ===
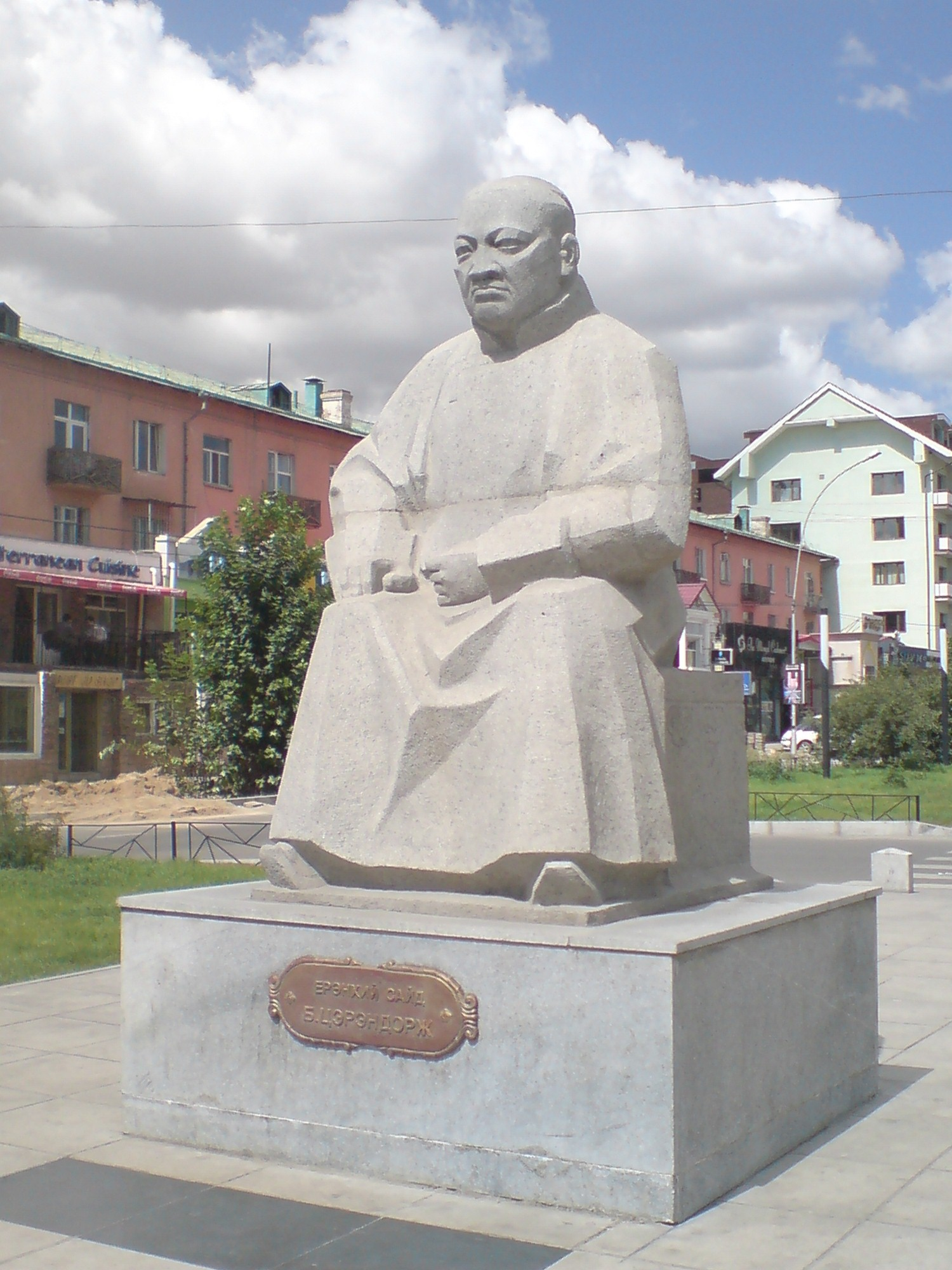
Tserendorj's monument in Ulaanbaatar

Following the 1921 Revolution and the subsequent friendship agreement with the Soviet Union, soviet troops were stationed in Mongolia exercising significant influence on the new government's political and ideological development. From 1926 to 1928, as Moscow tightened its control over the Mongolian political process, Tserendorj was pressured to include Russians in high-ranking positions within his government. The minister of finance, chairman of the economic council, head of Mongolian construction, head of the domestic trading organization, chairman of the military council, and minister of war were all Russian nationals. A Russian also headed the secret police along with six Russian advisers.

To offset the growing influence of the Soviets in internal affairs, Tserendorj pursued international recognition of Mongolian independence, not only from Russia but from other nations as well. He also hoped to see Mongolia become a neutral state, akin to an Asian Switzerland. Outreach efforts to Europe, Japan, and the United States were eventually stifled by Moscow and Comintern agents within the Mongolian government. Later, Tserendorj and his allies came under heavy criticism from pro-Soviet members of the MPRP who felt such efforts were counterrevolutionary and a betrayal of the special relationship that had developed between Mongolia and its chief benefactor.

Tserendorj rejected such criticism while also resisting what he saw as heavy-handed Soviet pressure to rapidly abolish private property in Mongolia, implement cooperatives and state industries, and persecute the Buddhist Church. He believed these policies conflicted with the country's nomadic culture and Buddhist traditions. He also became increasing uncomfortable with Comintern efforts to "divide and control" the MPRP by supporting the radicalized Mongolian Revolutionary Youth League and promoting younger, more hard-line party members, particularly from rural areas, to challenge the authority of the "old guard" leadership whom the Soviets suspected were overly conservative.

== Death ==
Weary of the Comintern's growing influence and activities, Tserendorj attempted to resign his position in 1927 saying he was too "old and sick" to continue. Nevertheless, both the Central Committee of the MPRP and the Soviets felt the respected prime minister was a useful tool and forced him to remain in his post. Tserendorj's health continued to decline and he died on 13 February 1928. Deputy Prime Minister Anandyn Amar was appointed as the prime minister of Mongolia on 21 February 1928.

== Notes ==
Political offices
Preceded by Sodnomyn Damdinbazar	Prime Minister of Mongolia; 1924 – 1928	Succeeded by Anandyn Amar
