= Battle of the Five Routes =

War between Mongolia and China over Inner Mongolia

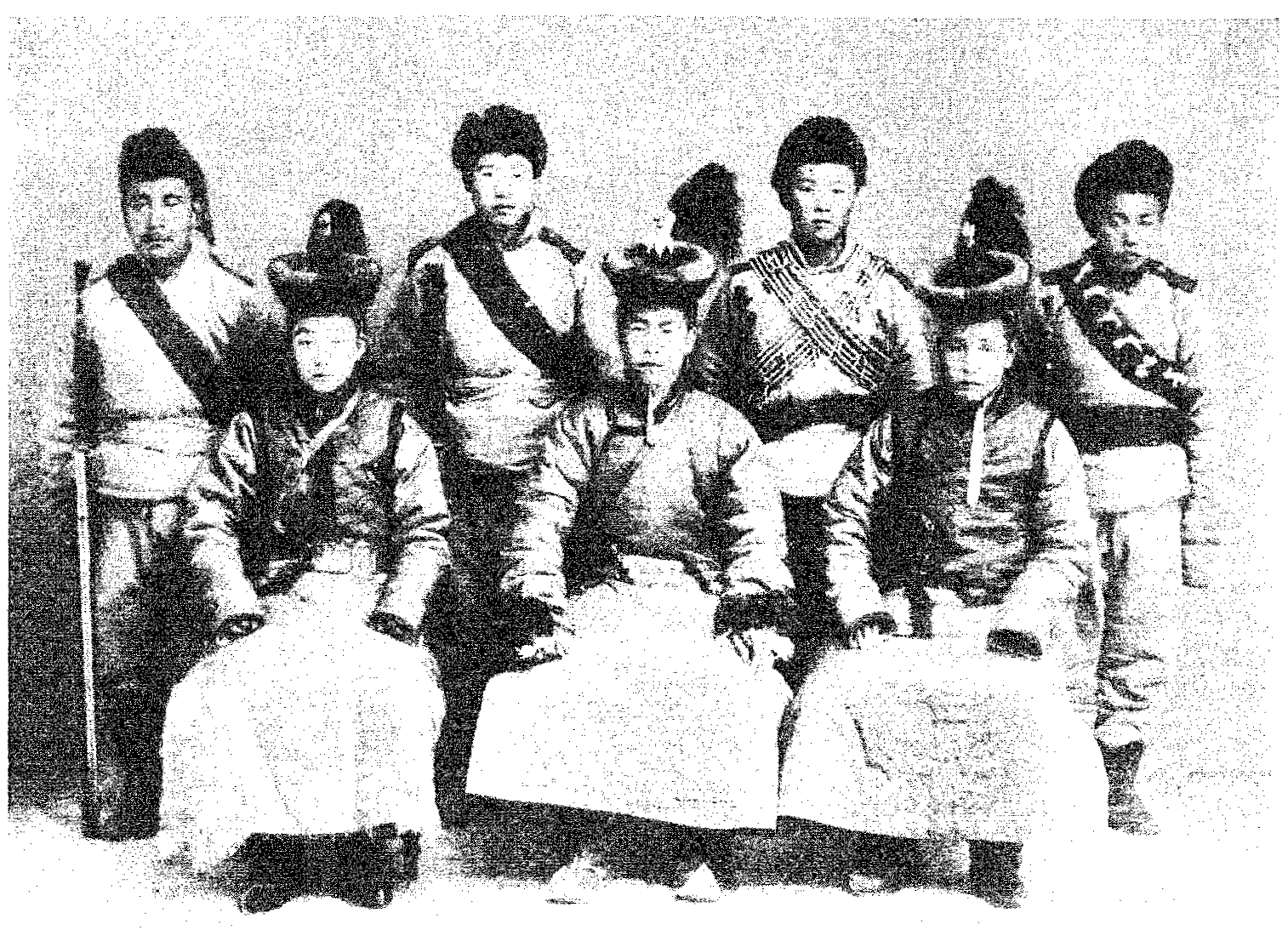
- Mongolian soldiers involved in the battle
Date	January–November, 1913
Location	Inner Mongolia
Result	Mongol defeat: The Bogd Khanate occupied much of Inner Mongolia, but withdrew completely under pressure from Russia and China.; Inner Mingolia remained under Chinese rule.; Treaty of Kyakhta (1915)

Belligerents
Bogd Khanate of Mongolia	Republic of China

Commanders and leaders
Manlaibaatar Damdinsüren; Bayantömöriin Khaisan; Shudargabaatar Babojab; Lavaran Soumya; Age-Arivjih	Wang Huaiqing

Strength
10,000 troops	70,000 troops

Casualties and losses
400 deaths 60 captured	3,795 deaths 76 captured

The Battle of the Five Routes (Mongolian: Таван замын байлдаан) is a battle fought in 1913 when the Bogd Khanate of Outer Mongolia invaded the Inner Mongolian region. The main cause of the invasion was to liberate Inner Mongolia and annex the region.

The Bogd Khan's government promptly informed the nobles of Inner Mongolia of the declaration of independence. Armed uprisings also took place in some parts of Inner Mongolia. Under the instigation of Inner Mongolian princes, the Bogd Khan's government decided to send troops south to occupy Inner Mongolia by force. The Government of China has also used force to control Inner Mongolia. In early 1913, the Mongolian army launched an offensive against Inner Mongolia in five directions and achieved widespread victory.

By October 1913, the Mongolian army had basically controlled the leagues and banners in western Inner Mongolia, but at the same time began to face the situation of supply cessation in the rear. In late the same month, the Chinese army began to counterattack. The Mongolian army was no longer able to launch military operations and began to withdraw from Inner Mongolia at the end of the year. The main reasons for the Mongol army's defeat were the shortage of weapons and the Russian government's strong opposition to the war.

== See also ==
- Battle of Khovd
- Mongolian Revolution of 1911
