= Bayantömöriin Khaisan =

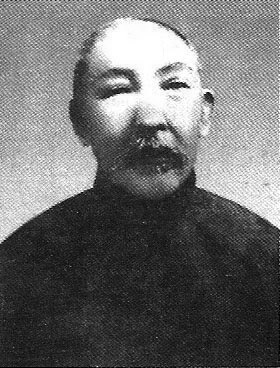
Bayantömöriin Khaisan

Bayantömöriin Khaisan (Mongolian: Баянтөмөрийн Хайсан; Chinese: 伯顏帖木儿·海山), also spelled Khayishan (ᠬᠠᠶᠢᠰᠤᠨ, qayišan) (c. 1862-1917), was one of leading figures of the Mongolian Revolution of 1911 for Mongolian independence from China.

== Kharchin banner official ==
Khaisan was born to the Khailtad clan in the Kharchin Right Banner of the Zost League, Qing Dynasty (modern-day Ningcheng County, Chifeng, Inner Mongolia, China). The Zost League bordered Liaoning to the south, from which peasants reclaimed grassland from Zost into productive agricultural fields. In this process, his family became wealthy landowners. He received a well-rounded education and had full command of Mongolian, Manchu and Chinese (and later Russian) languages.

He worked at the banner office of the Kharchin Right Banner. When the Chinese secret society named Jindandao attacked the banner in 1891, he guided the government forces dispatched from Zhili province to suppress the rebels. He also helped his lord Prince Günsennorov modernize Mongol education and military training. In 1900, influenced by the Boxer Rebellion, the remnants of the Jindandao resumed their activity. As a banner official, he crushed some 500 rebels with banner troops.

In the winter of 1902, a false charge forced Khaisan to flee his homeland. He personally arrested one surviving rebel leader named Zhang Liansheng (張連升), who used rent strikes and other methods of protest against wealthy Mongol landlords. However, he had to hand over him to a Chinese prefecture because, after the Jindandao incident, the Han Chinese in Zost were put under the jurisdiction of a local prefecture. Zhang committed suicide during escort but his family charged Khaisan with murder.

== Mongol independence movement ==
He fled to Harbin, where he got acquainted with Russian Colonel Khitrovo. He worked as an editor of the first Mongolian language newspaper (mongɣul-un sonin bičig), which was published by Imperial Russia's Chinese Eastern Railway. He then secretly went to Urga (modern-day Ulaanbaatar) around 1907.

By this time he came to think that the Mongols must establish an independent state of their own. In 1909 he met Gustaf J. Ramstedt, who visited Mongolia on his second archaeological expedition, to whom he told his subversive idea. Also, according to the Russian Colonel M. Popov, he asked Russian representatives to supply Mongols with arms and to help them establish a national government. He added that otherwise Mongols would seek help from the Empire of Japan.

In spring 1910, the political tension was heightened as the new Manchu amban Sandowa arrived at Urga to enforce the New Policy, which, Mongols thought, would push them into the margin of survival. After secret meetings by nobles and lamas, they decided to send a mission to Imperial Russia to ask for support. As a member of the mission, Khaisan visited Saint Petersburg in August. He seems to have represented Inner Mongolia, and thus they had Pan-Mongolist aspirations to include present-day Chinese territory in Mongolia. His role in the movement is unclear due to lack of sufficient historical sources of this period. Chen Lu, then the Chinese representative in Urga, wrote that in 1915 Tserendorj, Vice Minister of Foreign Affairs, said, "If Khaisan has not come to Urga, Outer Mongolia would not have been able to gain its independence."

Soon after the Chinese Xinhai Revolution in October, Mongol nobles and lamas declared independence, establishing the Bogd Khaan government. He took a high-ranking post in the most influential Home Ministry and worked under Home Minister Tserenchimed, who was also a radical pan-Mongolist. He was, however, in a weak position in the new government. The alien had to use his patron Tserenchimed to exert authority. Both Khaisan and Tserenchimed were soon disappointed with the Russian policy toward Mongolia. Khaisan came to be labeled anti-Russian by Russian representatives. In July 1912, pro-Russian Sain Noyon Khan Namnansüren was appointed as the first prime minister, striking a severe blow to both Khaisan and Tserenchimed.

In 1912 Bogd Khaan gave Khaisan the rank of duke ("ulsad tuslagchi gün" or simply "gün") and a land near the Mongolian-Russian border. Khaisan brought his family there, and began agricultural development with his Russian, Buryat and Han Chinese employees, which caused trouble with the local nomadic population.

The future of the Bogd Khan government remained uncertain. In his struggle for the international recognition of Mongolian independence, Tserenchimed tried to make a diplomatic contact with Japan in February 1913. His attempt was failed not only because of strong Russian pressure but also because Japan took a non-interference policy toward Outer Mongolia, disappointing Inner Mongolian secessionists including Khaisan.

In January 1913 the liberation campaign of the south was initiated by Khaisan and other Mongols from the south including Udai from the Jirim League and Manlaibaatar Damdinsüren from Khölönbuir. Although the Bogd Khaan forces successfully captured a large portion of the south by mid-1913, the Russian objection and shortage of supplies forced them to withdraw to Outer Mongolia in December.

At the same time, Khaisan had kept secret contact with his former lord Prince Günsennorov, who then took the side of the Republic of China. In September 1913, his son was sent to Beijing claiming that Khaisan was anxious to return to his homeland. Khaisan was arrested by the Bogd Khaan government on charges of treason. His son in Beijing asked the Chinese government to press the Bogd Khaan government to release Khaisan. As a result, Khaisan was released in early 1914.

In November 1913, Russia and China proclaimed a joint declaration that, despite Mongols' objection, recognized China's suzerainty and confined the area of autonomy to Outer Mongolia. The tripartite agreement of Kyakhta of 1915 formally recognized Outer Mongolia's autonomy within China, which delivered a fatal blow to the pan-Mongolists.

With his hope broken, Khaisan moved to Beijing via Russia in 1915. He was given the position of Vice President of the Bureau of Mongolian and Tibetan Affairs and the high rank of beise by Yuan Shikai. He died in Beijing in 1917.
