= Gustaf John Ramstedt =

Finnish diplomat, orientalist and linguist (1873–1950)

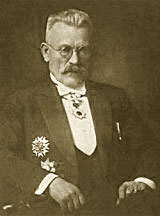
Gustaf John Ramstedt

Gustaf John Ramstedt (22 October 1873 – 25 November 1950) was a Finnish diplomat, orientalist and linguist. He was also an early Finnish Esperantist, and chairman of the Esperanto-Association of Finland.

== Biography ==
Ramstedt was born in Ekenäs in Southern Finland, and was brother of Armas Ramstedt, who was later a professor of Linguistics and Occidentalist, politician Emanuel Ramstedt, and singer Rafael Ramstedt.

As an undergraduate, he attended the University of Helsinki, where he studied Finno-Ugric languages under Eemil Nestor Setälä. He was later attracted to the study of Altaic languages and went to Mongolia to study the Mongolian language at the suggestion of Otto Donner. He later became professor extraordinarius in Altaic languages at the same university.

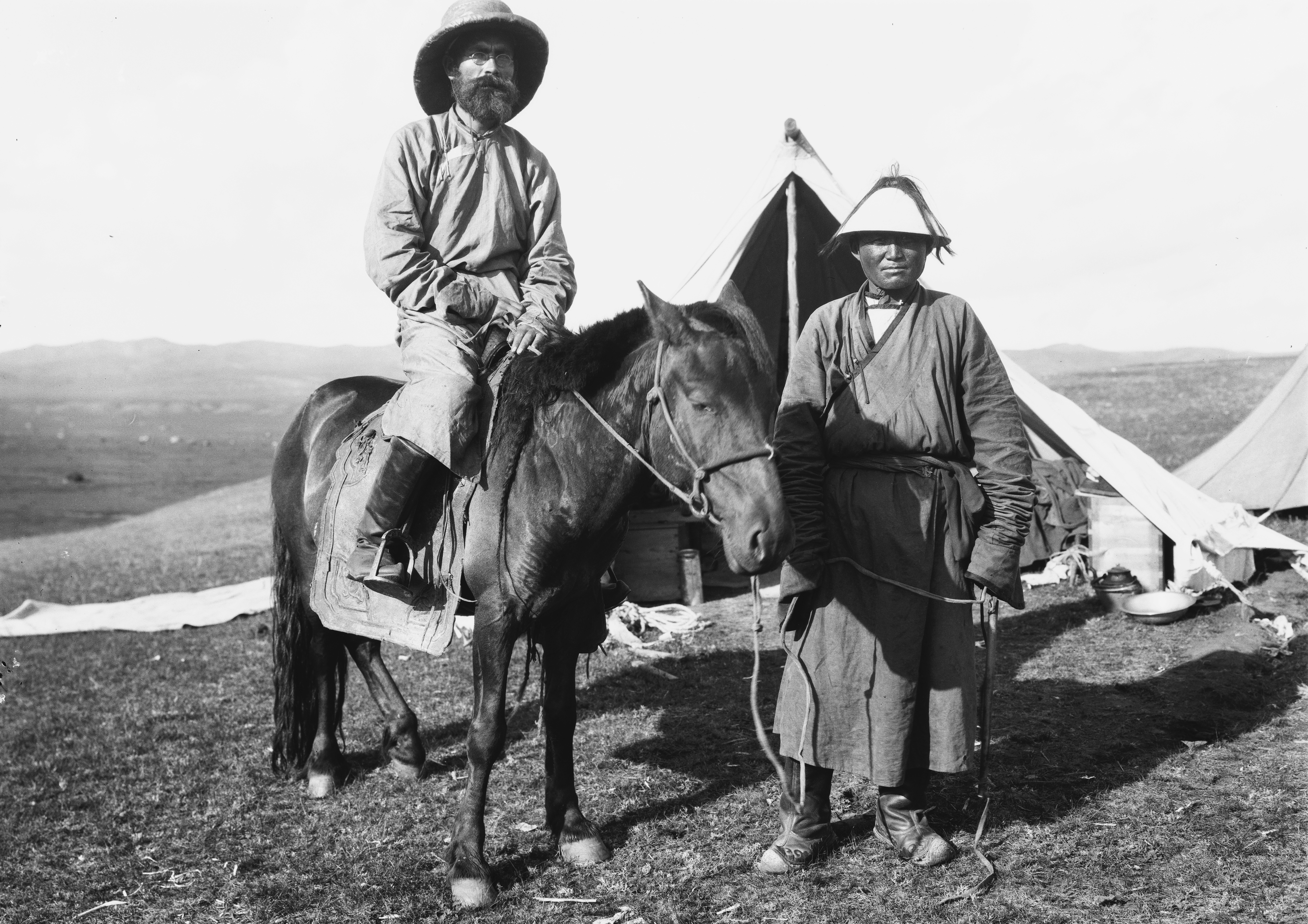
G. J. Ramstedt in Mongolia with a guide in 1909

During his expeditions in Mongolia, Ramstedt become a personal friend to highly educated Buryat Mongol Agvan Dorzhiev who acted as full representative of 13th Dalai Lama, Thubten Gyatso and was a full member in Tibetan Government, Kashag as Minister of Treasures (Finances). Ramstedt was one of the few foreigners who was invited to visit Lhasa, but unfortunately the coming events prevented his visit to Tibet. In 1911 the Mongolian delegation in St. Petersburg asked Ramstedt to act as mediator with Imperial Russian government to support the Mongolian Independence from Chinese Empire. He managed to confirm the Russians of the good will of Mongolian representatives and they supplied 15,000 modern rifles to the Mongolians to start the uprising against the Chinese rule in Mongolia.

In 1912, when Ramstedt was in Urga, Mongolia, the Mongol leaders; Da Lama, Chin Van Khanddorj, and Haisan-Gung asked him to help with the negotiations with the Russian representatives which did not accept the Mongol idea to unify Urjanhai, Mongolia (including also Inner Mongolia) and Buryat Mongolia to one modern Mongol State. Ramstedt advised the Mongol leaders to seek also international recognition for their state from other states, particularly Japan, Britain, Germany, France and United States. Ramstedt did not know anything of the secret agreement between Russia and Japan where Inner Mongolia was promised by both States to be kept as a part of China.

Following the independence of Finland in 1917, he became Finland's first envoy to Japan, as a Chargé d'affaires, from 1920 to 1929, during which he was a frequent guest lecturer at Tokyo Imperial University, where he influenced Kunio Yanagita, Izuru Shimura, Kyōsuke Kindaichi, and Shimpei Ogura. He acquired command of the Japanese language remarkably quickly.

Ramstedt's actions in Japan played a part in resolving the Åland Islands dispute. While stationed in Tokyo he provided a detailed memo about the Finnish view of the situation for use of the Japanese delegation in the League of Nations. Japan sided with Finland on the matter and consequently provided important support.

Ramstedt is one of the earliest esperantists in Finland, learning the language in 1895. He became chairman of the Esperanto Association of Finland in 1936, remaining in that position either to 1939 or 1941. During his stay in Japan, he both helped and was helped by the Esperanto movement there. He also made young poet Kenji Miyazawa interested in Esperanto.

Ramstedt was a pioneer in the study of numeral etymologies of a number of Asian language families (Turkic, Mongolian, Tungusic, as well as the possible isolate Korean). He also did extensive work on the general etymological history of Korean.

Ramstedt died in Helsinki.

== Publications ==
- Bergtscheremissische Sprachstudien, Helsinki, 1902 (Hill)
- "Über die Zahlwörter der altaischen Sprachen," JSFOu 24: 1–24, 1905
- Kalmückisches Wörterbuch, Helsinki, 1935
- "Studies in Korean Etymology," MSFOu 95, Helsinki: Suomalais-Ugrilainen Seura, 1949
- A Korean Grammar. Helsinki: Suomalais-ugrilainen Seura, 1939.
- Einführung in die altaische Sprachwissenschaft, 'Introduction to Altaic Linguistics', 2 volumes. Helsinki: Suomalais-Ugrilainen Seura, 1952–1957.
- Seven Journeys Eastward 1898-1912. Among the Cheremis, Kalmyks, Mongols and in Turkestan and to Afghanistan. Translated by John R. Krueger. Bloomington, 1978

== See also ==
- Dzungarian Gate
