= Sain Noyon Khan =

1820 map showing Sain Noyon aimag

Sain Noyon Khan (Mongolian: ᠰᠠᠶᠢᠨ
ᠨᠣᠶᠠᠨ
ᠬᠠᠨ; Cyrillic: Сайн ноён хан; Chinese: 賽音諾顏汗), known as Sain Noyon before 1911, refers to the territory as well as the Chingizid dynastic rulers of the Sain Noyon Khanate.

The first ruler of Sain Noyon tribe Tümenkhen was a grand son of Gersenji Khongtaiji. He was awarded the title "Sain Noyon" by the 4th Dalai Lama because of his great contribution to the Tibetan Buddhism in Mongolia.

In order to diminish the predominant influence of the Tüsheet Khans in Khalkha, in 1725, the Yongzheng Emperor of Qing created Sain Noyon Aimag, carved out of 19 khoshuu (sub-districts) in western Tüsheet Khan Aimag. During Qing dynasty, the title of Sain Noyon rulers was khoshoi chin van (хошой чин ван), lower than khan. However, their influence was no less than that of three Khalka khans. Since 1728, each aimag was governed by aimag congress chigulgan (чуулган) comprising the lords of the khoshuns; the chigulgan daruga (чуулган дарга - official presiding the congress) was appointed from the khoshun lords by the Qing government. the congress of Sain Noyon aimag was called the "Tsetserlegiin chuulgan" (Цэцэрлэгийн чуулган, 齊齊爾里克盟), which was held every three years in Tsetserleg.

After Mongolian independence from the Qing China in 1911, the ruler of Sain Noyon was given the title of "Khan" by the order of Bogd Khan, since then, the aimag was renamed "Sain Noyon Khan". In 1923, following the Mongolian Revolution of 1921, the Sain Noyon Khan aimag was renamed Tsetserleg Mandal uulyn aimag (Цэцэрлэг Мандал уулын аймаг), which named after Tsetserleg. In 1930, the four aimags were divided into the present day 21 smaller aimags, which were subdivided into sums.

== Administrative subdivisions of Sain Noyon Khan aimag ==
- Jebtsundamba Khutuktu's three shabi otog that were exempted from corvée
- Jasagtu Khan aimag Erdene düüregch zasgiin khoshuu's rear pasture otog
- Khövsgöl Nuur Uriankhai's rear two sums
- Jasagtu Khan aimag Erdene düüregch zasgiin khoshuu's front pasture otog
- Khatan baatar Darkhan chin vangiin khoshuu
- Itgemjit zasgiin khoshuu
- Mergen zasgiin khoshuu
- Erkh zasgiin khoshuu
- Saruul zasgiin khoshuu
- Eyetei zasgiin khoshuu
- Bishrelt zasgiin khoshuu
- Tüsheet zasgiin khoshuu
- Shiva shireet khutuktu's shabi
- Erdene Zaya bandida khutuktu's shabi
- Setsen zasgiin khoshuu
- Dalai zasgiin khoshuu
- Baatar zasgiin khoshuu
- Khamba khutuktu's shabi
- Subjects of Dashpuntsaglin monastery
- Khoshuuch mergen zasgiin khoshuu
- Narbanchin khutuktu's shabi
- Naran khutuktu's shabi
- Jonon zasgiin khoshuu
- Erdene zasgiin khoshuu
- Chin süjigt nomun khan khutuktu's shabi
- Tsogtoi zasgiin khoshuu
- Darkhan zasgiin khoshuu
- Daichin zasgiin khoshuu
- Süjigt zasgiin khoshuu
- Zorigt zasgiin khoshuu
- Achit zasgiin khoshuu
- Sain noyon khan khoshuu
- Akhai zasgiin khoshuu
- Üizen zasgiin khoshuu
- Erdene bandida khutuktu's shabi
- Mergen noyon khutuktu's shabi
- Yost zasgiin khoshuu
- Ilden zasgiin khoshuu

== Sain Noyons/Sain Noyon Khans ==
1. Dashdondov (1725-1726), Jasagh khoshoi chin van
2. Lamjav (1726-1733), Jasagh khoshoi chin van
3. Dechinjav (1733-1772), Jasagh khoshoi chin van Sain noyon
4. Norovjav (1772-1786), Jasagh khoshoi chin van Sain noyon
5. Tsedenjav (1786-1793), Jasagh khoshoi chin van Sain noyon
6. Rinchindorj (1793-1802), Jasagh khoshoi chin van Sain noyon
7. Puntsagdash (1802-1817), Jasagh khoshoi chin van Sain noyon
8. Tserendorj (1817-1853), Jasagh khoshoi chin van Sain noyon
9. Damchoi (1853-1871), Jasagh khoshoi chin van Sain noyon
10. Tserendondov (1871-1883), Jasagh khoshoi chin van Sain noyon
11. Tögs-Ochir (1883-1896), Jasagh khoshoi chin van Sain noyon
12. Namnansüren (1896-1919), Jasagh Tümenkhen Nomch eyetei erkh daichin Sain Noyon Khan; as "Jasagh Sain Noyon khoshoi chin van" before 1911
13. Batsükh (1919-1923), Jasagh Tümenkhen Nomch eyetei erkh daichin Sain Noyon Khan

== chigulgan daruga ==
1. Efü Tseren (1728-1750), Jasagh khoshoi chin van
2. Tsengünjav (1750-1756), Jasagh khoshoi chin van
3. Chamchugjav (1756-1771), Jasagh khoshuuny beis
4. Tsevdenjav (1771-1779), Jasagh töriin jün van
5. Sodovdorj (1779-1784), Jasagh khoshuuny beis
6. Sampildorj (1784-1793), Jasagh töriin jün van
7. Rinchindorj (1793-1802), Jasagh khoshoi chin van Sain noyon
8. Demchigjav (1802-1831), Jasagh töriin jün van
9. Gonchigjav (1831-1845), Jasagh töriin beil
10. Tserendorj (1845-1871), Jasagh khoshoi chin van
11. Shirbazarjav (1871-1883), Jasagh jün van zeregt beil
12. Choisürenjav (1883-1906), Jasagh töriin jün van
13. Namnansüren (1906-1912), Jasagh Sain Noyon khoshoi chin van
