= Jalkhanz Khutagt Sodnomyn Damdinbazar =

3rd Prime Minister of Mongolia

Sodnomyn Damdinbazar
- Содномын Дамдинбазар
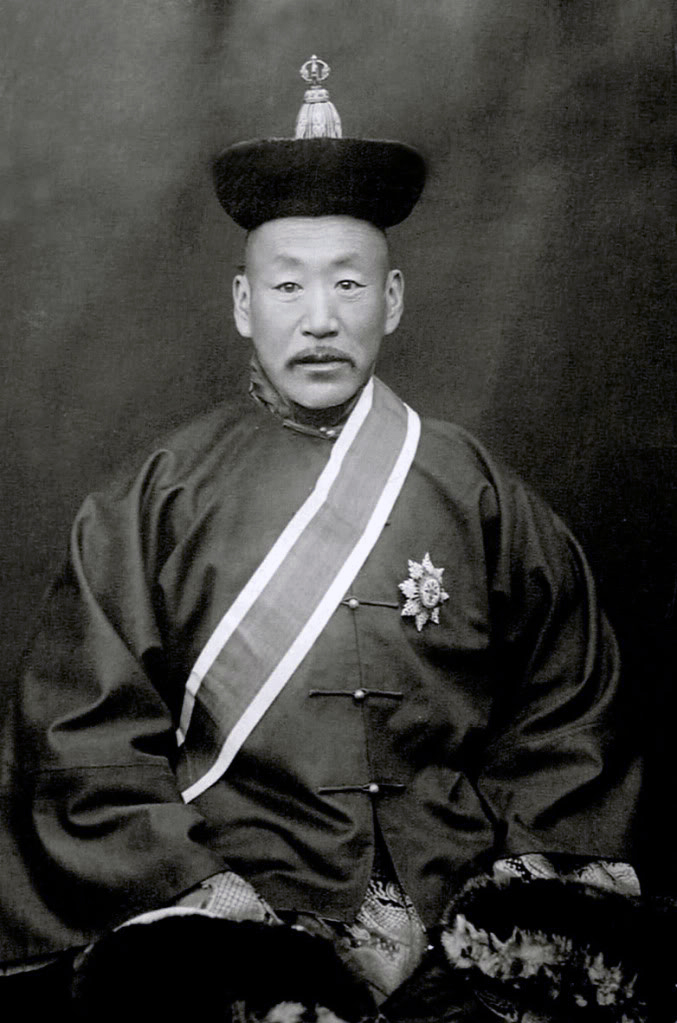

3rd Prime Minister of Mongolia
- In office 3 March 1922 – 23 June 1923
- Preceded by: Dogsomyn Bodoo
- Succeeded by: Balingiin Tserendorj
- In office 22 February 1921 – May 1921
- Preceded by: Gonchigjalzangiin Badamdorj
- Succeeded by: Manzushir Khutagt Sambadondogiin Tserendorj (acting)

Personal details
- Born: 1874 Oigon Lake, Outer Mongolia, China
- Died: 23 June 1923 (aged 48–49) Niislel Khüree, Mongolia

The Jalkhanz Khutagt Sodnomyn Damdinbazar (Mongolian: Жалханз Хутагт Содномын Дамдинбазар; 1874 – 23 June 1923) was a Mongolian tulku who played a prominent role in the country's independence movement in 1911–1912. He served as Prime Minister of Mongolia twice: first in 1921 as part of the Bogd Khanate of Mongolia established by Roman von Ungern-Sternberg, and again from 1922 to 1923 under the revolutionary government of the Mongolian People's Party.

== Early life ==
Damdinbazar was born in 1874 at Oigon Lake in the Nömrög district of present-day Zavkhan aimag. His father Tserensodnom and mother Sonom were middle-class herders. In 1877 he was proclaimed Jalkhanz Khutagt or "saint incarnate" at Jalkhanzyn Khüree Monastery, in what is today Bürentogtokh, Khövsgöl. From the ages of 16 to 20 he was instructed in Tibetan and Mongolian script, mathematics, astrology, and religious matters as a śrāmaṇera in a monastery at Ikh Hüree (modern Ulaanbaatar).

== Political career ==
Damdinbazar supported Mongolian independence as early as 1900 during the military rebellion in Uliastai. From 1911 to 1912 he publicly campaigned for Mongolia's independence from Chinese rule. He was appointed Minister for the Pacification of the Western Border Areas during the Bogd Khanate and together with Khatanbaatar Magsarjav, Manlaibaatar Damdinsüren, Togtokh Taij, and Ja Lama took part in the liberation of Khovd. In recognition of his leadership he was awarded the honorable title Samadi Nomun Khan in 1912.

As a representative of the Bogd Khan's government, he traveled several times to Beijing to voice Mongolian concerns and demands. He was part of a delegation in 1919 that established contact with the American consul in Kalgan with a letter from the Bogd Khan inviting the U.S. to open a consulate in the newly renamed Mongolian capital Niislel Khüree.

After the Chinese occupied Niislel Khüree in 1919, Damdinbazar became an official under the Chinese minister Chen Yi while the Bogd Khan was placed under house arrest. He then served as prime minister and minister of the interior in the Mongolian government established by the Bogd Khan on 22 February 1921 after capture of Niislel Khuree by Roman von Ungern-Sternberg.

Damdinbazar ignored approaches made to him by Mongolian revolutionary forces in spring 1921 and withdrew from public service after Baron Ungern was defeated by the Soviet Red Army and Mongolian revolutionary forces under Damdin Sükhbaatar in July 1921. Later that year, however, he was contacted by Comintern agents and agreed to oppose White movement forces in Western Mongolia. He then joined forces with Khatanbaatar Magsarjav in Uliastai in the campaign against the Whites.

== Prime minister ==
In 1922 Dogsomyn Bodoo resigned as prime minister in the face of accusations that he conspired with reactionary enemies (including Ja Lama and the U.S. consul in Kalgan) to overthrow the government. Soon afterwards he was executed. Looking to quell resulting religious anger (Bodoo was a lama) party leaders including Sükhbaatar invited Damdinbazar to become the next prime minister. Damdinbazar died a little more than 15 months later, on 23 June 1923.

Political offices
| Preceded by Dogsomyn Bodoo | Prime Minister of Mongolia; 1922 - 1923 | Succeeded by Balingiin Tserendorj |
