= Gonchigjalzangiin Badamdorj =

Mongolian religious figure and prime minister from 1919 to 1920

Da Lama Gonchigjalzangiin Badamdorj
- Да Лам Гончигжалцангийн Бадамдорж
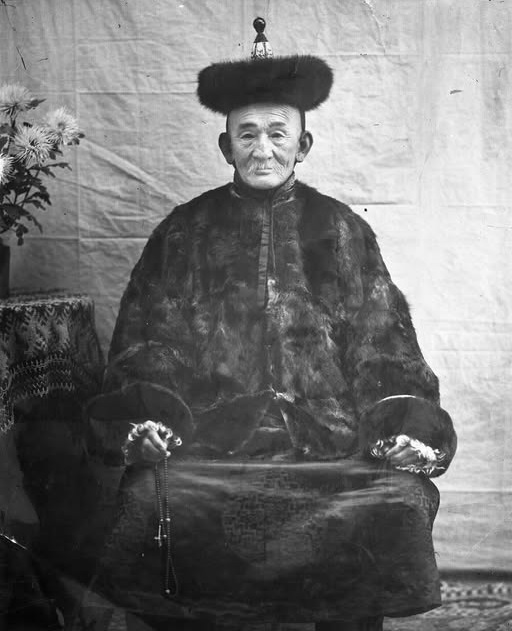
- Badamdorj in the late 1910s

2nd Prime Minister of Mongolia
- In office 9 April 1919 – 2 January 1920
- Preceded by: Tögs-Ochiryn Namnansüren
- Succeeded by: Jalkhanz Khutagt Sodnomyn Damdinbazar

Personal details
- Born: 1850 Outer Mongolia, Qing China
- Died: 1920 (aged 69–70) Outer Mongolia, Republic of China

Gonchigjalzangiin Badamdorj (Note: Mongolian: Гончигжалцангийн Бадамдорж; Chinese: 貢齊格扎爾贊吉·巴德瑪多爾濟; pinyin: Gòngqígézhārzànjí Bādémǎduōrjì; Tibetan: པདྨ་རྡོ་རྗེ། Padma Dorje) (1850–1920) was an early 20th-century Mongolian religious figure and prime minister under the Bogd Khanate from April 1919 to January 1920. He is best known in Mongolia for agreeing to Mongolia's "voluntary" relinquishment of independence from Chinese rule in 1919. Although he dedicated his entire life to Mongolia's independence, he was rendered powerless by the circumstances during one of the gravest threats his nation ever faced.

== Early life and career ==
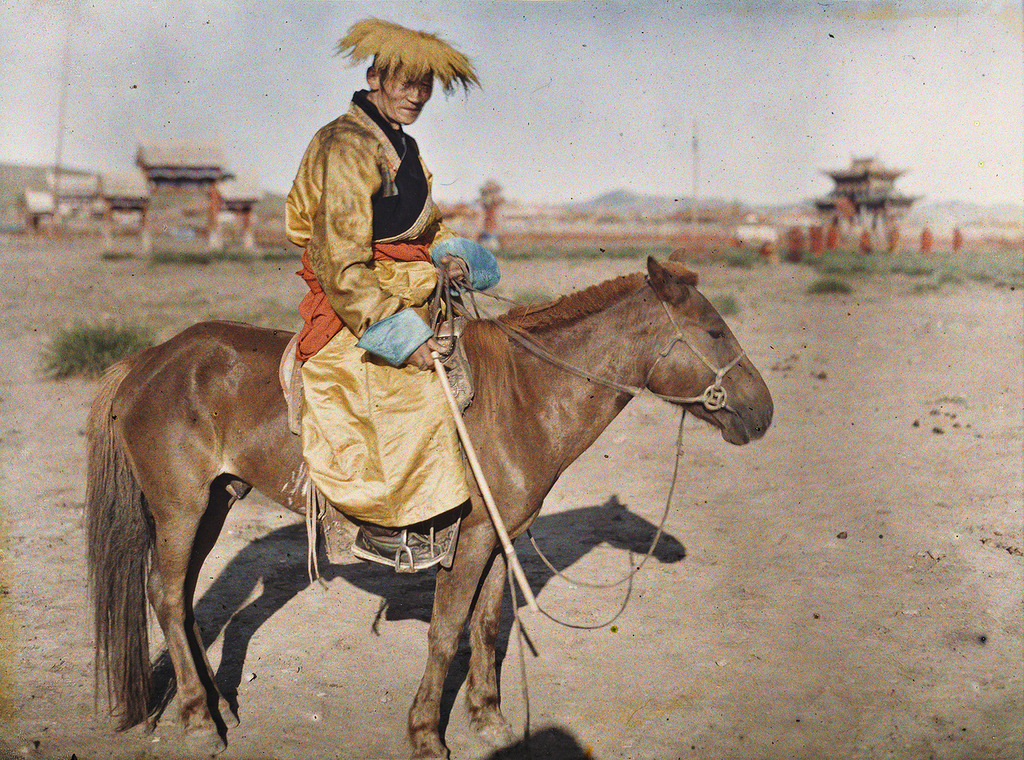
Autochrome of Badamdorj in 1913

Little is known about Badamdorj's early life; however, from 1900 to 1911, he served as an administrator, or Erdene Shanzav, of the Bogd Gegeen's estates. He was a close confidant, advisor, and tutor to the Khalkha spiritual leader, the Jebtsundamba Khutuktu (later to become the Bogd Khan), who, in 1895, dispatched him to St. Petersburg as the first Mongolian envoy to meet with the newly enthroned Czar Nicholas II and probe Russian willingness to support Mongolian aspirations for independence from Manchu rule.

In April 1910, Badamdorj moved to protect Mongolian lamas after a riot erupted near Gandan Monastery between lamas and Chinese merchants. As part of Qing efforts to increase Han control over Mongol territory and rein in the Buddhist hierarchy, the Qing emperor Puyi issued a decree removing Badamdorj as Shanzav and transferring his authority to the Qing Amban (viceroy) Sando. Despite this, Badamdorj was not a supporter of Mongolian independence, and when the Jebtsundamba Khutuktu sent a secret delegation of Khalkha nobles to St. Petersburg in 1911 to seek Russian backing for independence, Badamdorj revealed the mission to Sando.

Following Mongolia's declaration of independence from Chinese rule in November 1911, the Bogd Khan appointed Badamdorj the first Minister of Religion and State. In 1915, he was appointed Minister of Internal Affairs (and thus de facto prime minister) after his previous office, along with that of prime minister, was abolished. Although he headed the Bogd Khan's government, Badamdorj was adamant that the Jebtsundamba Khutuktu and his retinue should concern themselves only with religious rather than temporal matters, and so corruption flourished unchecked in Outer Mongolia, led by Badamdorj himself, who accepted bribes in exchange for the granting of royal titles and falsification of census figures.

== Abolition of Mongolian autonomy ==
Between 1915 and 1919, as Russian influence in the Far East waned following the outbreak of the First World War, Badamdorj, along with other conservative elements of the Bogd Khan's government, supported moves by Yuan Shikai and the newly formed Republic of China to bring autonomous Outer Mongolia back under Chinese rule. When Chinese troops were sent to Niislel Khüree, the capital of the Bogd Khanate, in August 1919 to protect against a Buryat and Inner Mongolian Pan-Mongolist invasion led by Grigory Semyonov, Khalkha nobles agreed to sign a declaration of "Sixty-Four Articles" "On respecting of Outer Mongolia by the government of China and improvement of her position in future after self-abolishing of autonomy".

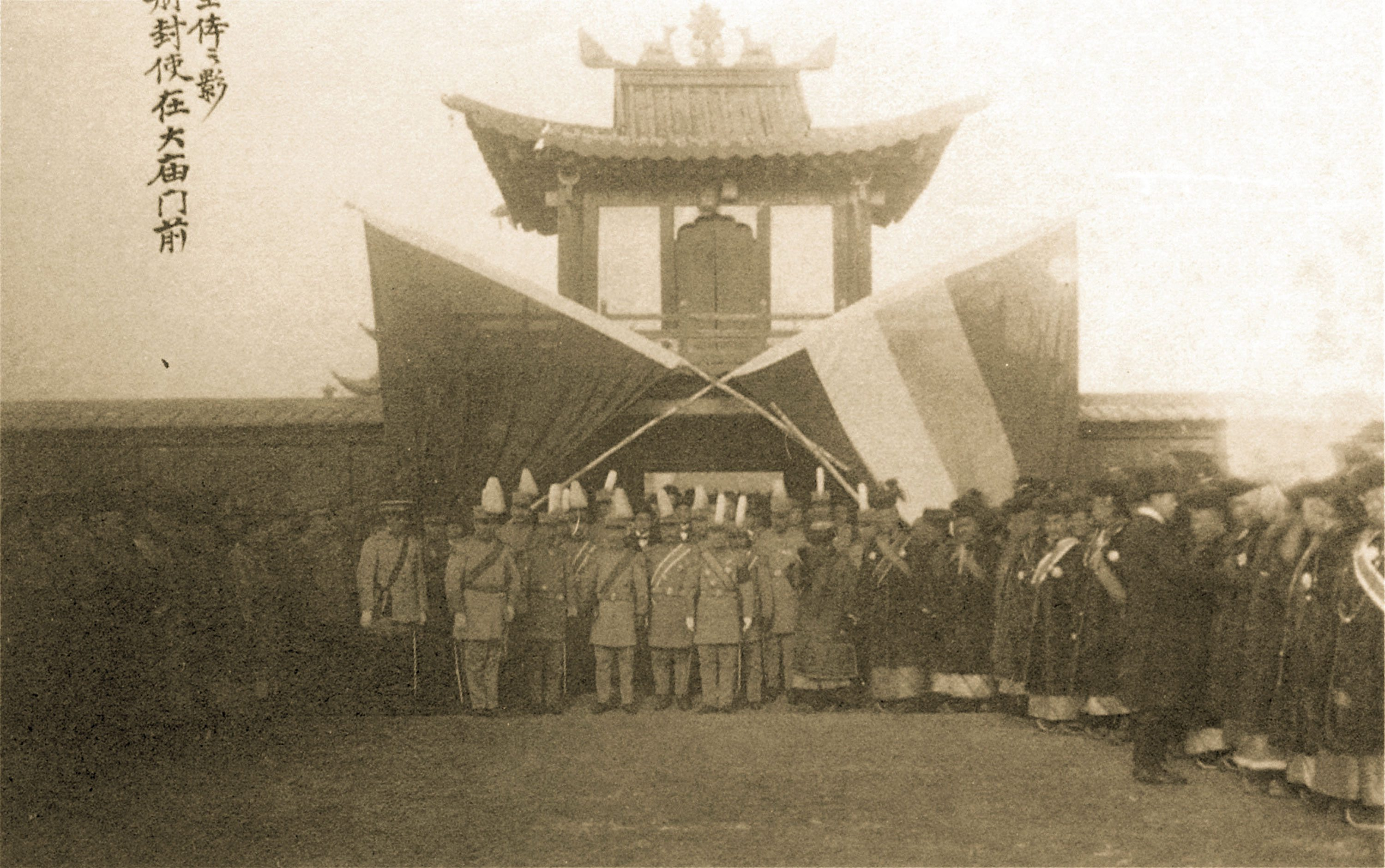
Ceremony marking the abolition of Mongolian autonomy, January 1920

In October 1919, China's new Northwest Frontier Commissioner Xu Shuzheng arrived in Khüree with a military escort and demanded that the "Sixty-Four Articles" be renegotiated. He submitted a much tougher set of conditions, the "Eight Articles," calling for the express declaration of Chinese sovereignty over Mongolia, an increase in Mongolia's population (presumably through Chinese colonization), and the promotion of commerce, industry, and agriculture. Xu installed Badamdorj, who represented reactionary lamas and was considered to be more pliable to Chinese demands, as prime minister. Xu threatened to exile the Bogd Khan if Badamdorj and others did not sign the "Eight Articles," in which the Mongolian government "voluntarily" relinquished the country's autonomy to Chinese administration. Other national leaders, including Foreign Minister Balingiin Tserendorj and the Bogd Khan himself, soon followed suit. Badamdorj remained prime minister for only a short period thereafter, until 2 January 1920, when Xu Shuzeng announced the abolition of Mongolia's autonomy in a ceremony at Khüree.

== Death ==
Badamdorj was branded a coward for not standing up to foreign threats, and he soon became the victim of a rumor campaign designed to taint his reputation. Ordinary people and even children would regularly insult him and suspect him of being bribed by Xu. A then-popular song with the lyrics "Badamdorj and the princes have sold the Mongols for silver and silk" was sung by the public. Disgraced, Badamdorj fled to the countryside and mysteriously died of diabetes a short while later in 1920.

== Notes ==
Political offices
Preceded by Tögs-Ochiryn Namnansüren	Prime Minister of Mongolia; 1919–1920	Succeeded by Sodnomyn Damdinbazar
