= Mongolian Revolution of 1911 =

1911 uprising in Mongolia, Qing dynasty

Coordinates: 47°55′13″N 106°55′02″E

- Part of the 1911 Revolution
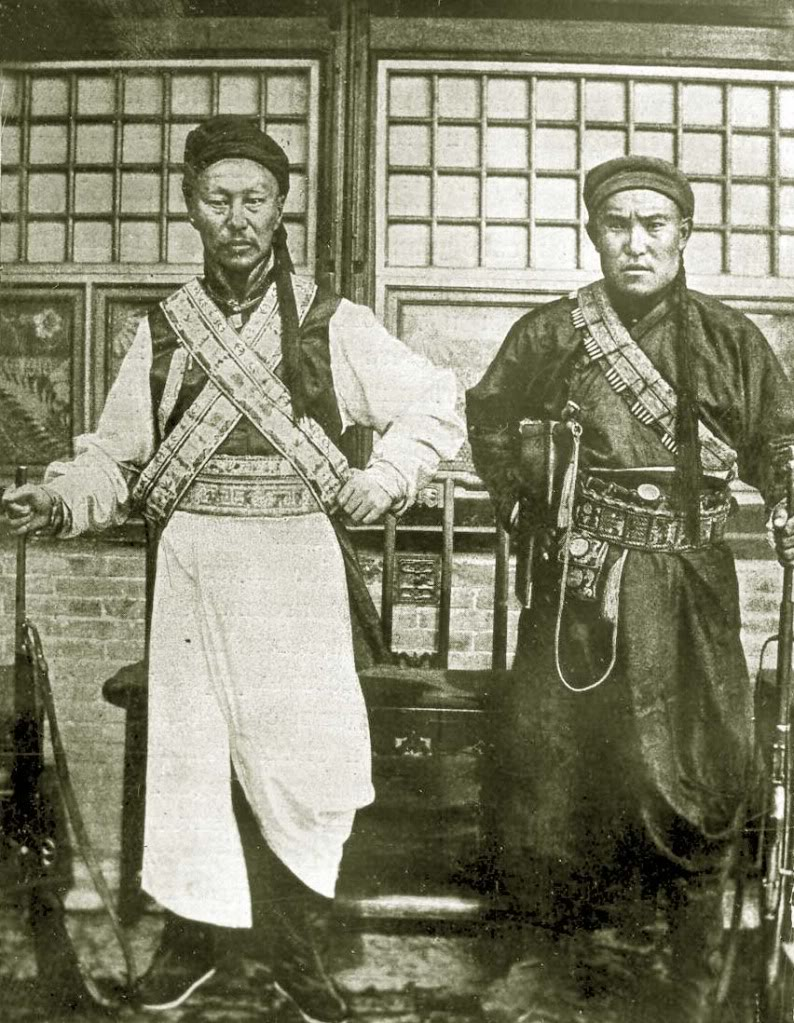
- Anti-Chinese commanders Togtokh and Bayar in Khüree (now Ulaanbaatar)
- Date: November 1911 – August 1912
- Location: Outer and Inner Mongolia, Qing dynasty
- Caused by: Late Qing reforms; Cultural assimilation and colonisation of Mongolia
- Goals: Independence of Mongolia
- Result: Nationalist victory: Bogd Khanate established in Outer Mongolia; Inner Mongolia remains under China

Parties
(Mongolia) Mongolian nationalists	Qing Empire	Russian Empire

Lead figures
Outer Mongolia: Tögs-Ochiryn Namnansüren; Da Lam Tserenchimed; Eighth Jebtsundamba Khutugtu; Sodnomyn Damdinbazar; Mijiddorjiin Khanddorj; Manlaibaatar Damdinsüren; Khatanbaatar Magsarjav; Inner Mongolia: Bayantömöriin Khaisan; Togtokh Taij; Sumiya beis; Udai van; Bavuujav; Upper Mongolia: Hurleg beis	Sando (POW)	Grigory Semyonov

The Mongolian Revolution of 1911 (Note: Mongolian: Үндэсний эрх чөлөөний хувьсгал, ᠦᠨᠳᠦᠰᠦᠨ ‍ᠦᠡᠷᠬᠡᠴᠢᠯᠦᠭᠡᠨ ‍ᠦᠬᠤᠪᠢᠰᠬᠠᠯ, romanized: Ündesnii erkh chölöönii khuwisgal, pronounced [untɘ̆sˈnʲi‿irx t͡ɕoˈɮonʲi ˈχʊ̈ɸsɢə̆ɮ]) occurred when the region of Outer Mongolia declared its independence from the Manchu-led Qing China during the Xinhai Revolution. A combination of factors, including economic hardship and failure to resist Western imperialism, led many in China to be unhappy with the Qing government. When a new program to settle Mongolia with ethnic Han and assimilate the natives was unveiled, it was met with resistance that resulted in Mongol independence from the Qing Empire. Many Barga and Inner Mongolian chieftains assisted in the revolution and became the revolution's leaders.

== Background ==
Outer Mongolia within Qing China in 1911.

In the early 20th century, Mongolia was impoverished. Repercussions from the Taiping Rebellion (1850–1864) were primarily responsible. Loss of tax revenue from South China during the rebellion and expenses for its suppression had depleted the Qing treasury. Silver, rather than livestock as was the custom, became the primary medium for paying taxes. The major source of silver for Mongols was loans from Han merchants. These loans, at crippling interest rates, were repaid in livestock, which was then exported to China proper. The result was a catastrophic decline in the size of the herds upon which the livelihood of Mongolians depended.

A disintegrating economy, growing debt, and increasing tax demands were ingredients of social and political unrest in Mongolia. However, it was Qing plans for the transformation of Outer Mongolia that produced the impetus for rebellion.

=== Qing reforms in Mongolia ===
The Qing dynasty (1644–1912) was founded by the Manchu clan Aisin Gioro in what is today Northeast China (also known as Manchuria). They were certainly not the first non-Han people to rule all of China, but the fate of previous dynasties had always been the same: they invaded; they governed; they assimilated; and eventually they merged, more or less becoming Chinese themselves. Attempts were made to keep the Manchu strain ethnically pure, although these efforts proved fruitless. The early Qing rulers enacted various laws to isolate Manchuria from China proper (Eighteen Provinces) and Mongolia. They did the same for the Mongols: Han Chinese were prohibited from entering Mongolia and Mongols were not allowed to travel outside their own leagues. Mongols were forbidden from speaking Chinese languages or intermarrying with the Han Chinese. While over time enforcement waned, the laws still remained on the books, receiving at least token observance.

Western imperialism in China during the latter part of the 19th century changed political priorities in China. The Qing defeat by the Japanese in 1895 (First Sino-Japanese War), followed shortly afterwards by the German seizure of Shandong and the "scramble for concessions" that followed dramatically proved the inadequacy of previous Qing efforts to resist the West. The Boxer Rebellion, and particularly Japan's victory over Russia in 1905, were widely interpreted in China as the triumph of constitutionalism over autocracy. It was then that far-reaching economic, political, and military reforms, known as the "New Administration" or "New Policies" (Xin zheng), were ordered.

In Outer Mongolia, however, the New Administration was implemented rather differently. The aim was not simply modernization, as it was in Han Chinese territories, but cultural assimilation. Russia's occupation of the Liaodong Peninsula in 1898 and then of Northern Manchuria in 1900 confirmed the Qing government's fears of a larger Russian design on the entire northern frontier of their empire. Qing rulers came to believe that the continued survival of their state as an integral entity depended on the effectiveness of their frontier serving as a protective "shield" (in the language of the time) for China proper. To accomplish this, the peoples inhabiting this region would have to become Chinese.

Between 1901 and 1910, therefore, the Qing government inaugurated an expansive plan for Chinese colonization of the frontier and reorganization of its native governments (though the colonization of lands in Inner Mongolia by the Chinese had started much earlier). A decree in 1910 abrogating the old prohibitions against Chinese settling in Outer Mongolia, Chinese and Mongols intermarrying, and Mongols using the Chinese language was the final step toward dismantling the wall of isolation that the Manchus themselves had erected centuries earlier.

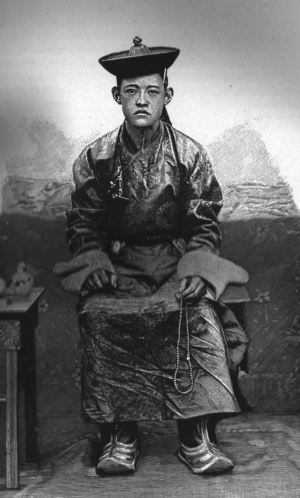
Jebtsundamba Khutuktu

In early 1910, the Qing government appointed Sando (or Sandowa), a Mongol himself and former deputy lieutenant governor of Guihwa, as viceroy of Mongolia in the capital city of Urga (modern Ulaanbaatar), to implement the New Administration. He immediately set about organizing twenty offices to oversee such matters as the military, taxation, police, government and commerce. Plans were made for the colonization of Mongolia with Chinese farmers. In January 1911 a Lieutenant Colonel Tang Zaili arrived to supervise the organization of a Mongolian army, half of which was to consist of Mongolian herdsmen. A 400-room barracks was erected near Urga. The Mongolians saw in all this a threat to their very survival. Their desperation was echoed in a petition to the Qing government: "Among the many directives repeatedly issued, there is not one which benefits the Mongolians. Consequently, we all desire that we be allowed to live according to our ancient ways." The arrogance and brutality of Tang Zaili's staff and military escort did not help.

== Revolution ==
=== Mongolian resistance ===
No more than a month after Sando's arrival, a brawl broke out between some intoxicated lamas (Buddhist priests) and Chinese at a Chinese carpentry shop in Urga. Such incidents were not unknown in the past, but they had been firmly suppressed by Qing officials. This one developed differently. When Sando arrived at Gandan Monastery, the principal monastery in the city, to make arrests, the lamas pelted him and his troops with stones, forcing them to withdraw. Sando demanded that the Jebzundamba Khutuktu (variously spelled), the spiritual leader in Urga of the Mongolians, surrender a particular lama believed to be the ringleader of the incident. The Khutuktu refused and Sando fined him. In response, the Mongolians petitioned the Qing government to remove Sando, but without success.

Other incidents followed, all underscoring the diminished authority of Sando: a minor noble, Togtokh Taij, with a small band, had with the connivance of local Mongolian officials plundered several Chinese merchant shops in eastern Mongolia. Sando dispatched two detachments of soldiers to capture Togtokh. They were led into a trap by their Mongolian guide; most were killed. Mongolian princes resisted providing soldiers for Sando's army. And the prince of the khoshuun which Togtokh had raided refused Sando's demand to pay compensation to the plundered Chinese merchants.

=== Decision for independence ===
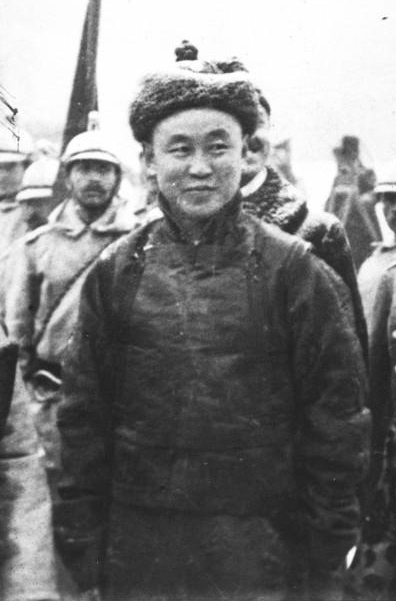
Prince Namnansüren

By the spring of 1911, some prominent Mongolian nobles including Prince Tögs-Ochiryn Namnansüren persuaded the Jebstundamba Khutukhtu to convene a meeting of nobles and ecclesiastical officials to discuss independence. The Khutukhtu consented. To avoid suspicion, he used as a pretext the occasion of a religious festival, at which time the assembled leaders would discuss the need to reapportion taxes among the khoshuuns. The meeting occurred on July 10 and the Mongolians discussed whether it would be better to submit to or resist the will of the Qings. The assembly became deadlocked, some arguing for complete, others for partial, resistance. Eighteen nobles decided to take matters into their hands. Meeting secretly in the hills outside of Urga, they decided that Mongolia must declare its independence. They then persuaded the Khutuktu to send a delegation of three prominent representatives—a secular noble, an ecclesiastic, and a lay official from Inner Mongolia—to Russia for assistance. The particular composition of the delegation—a noble, a cleric, and a commoner—may have been intended to invest the mission with a sense of national consensus.

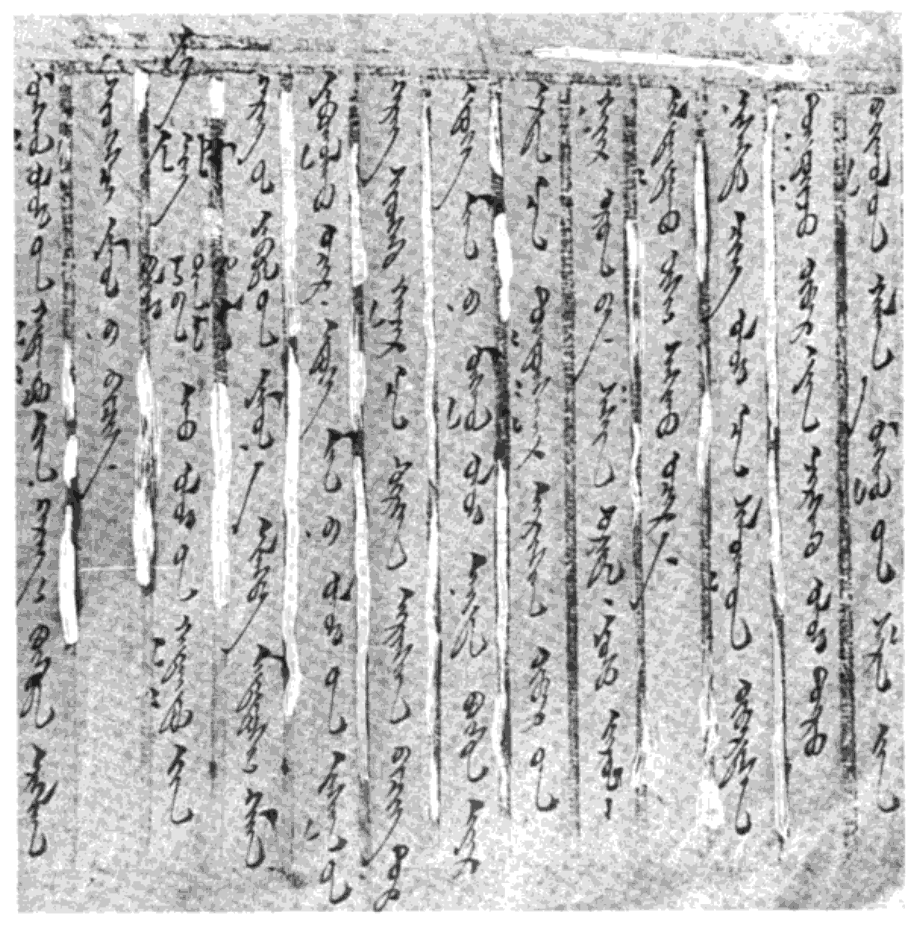
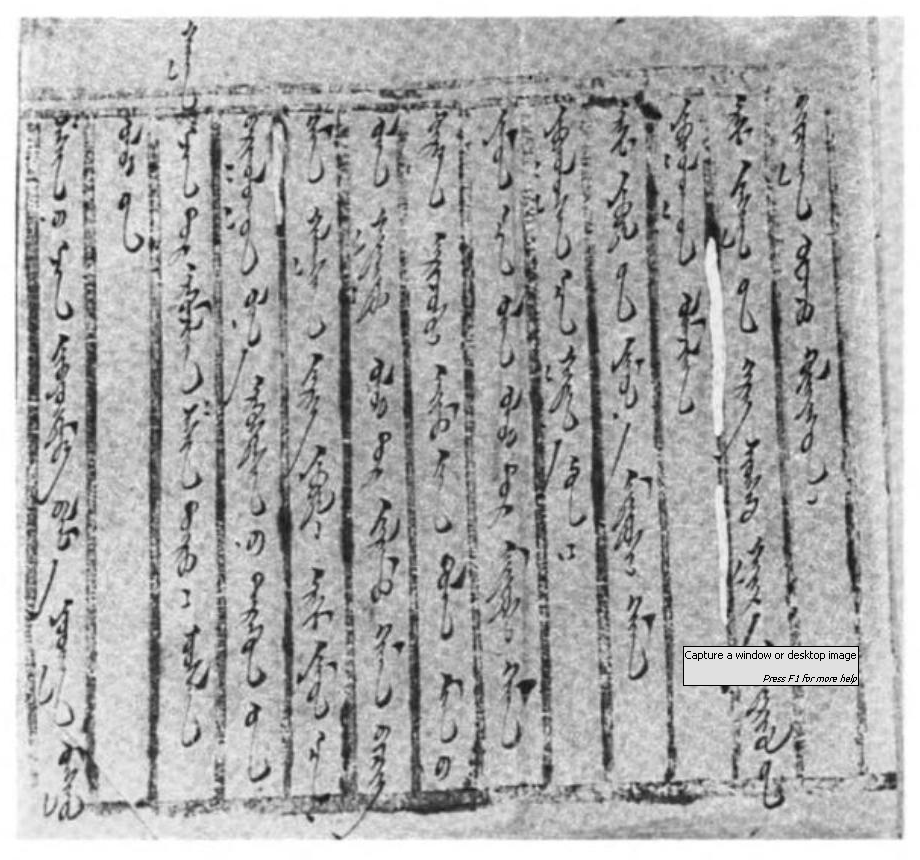
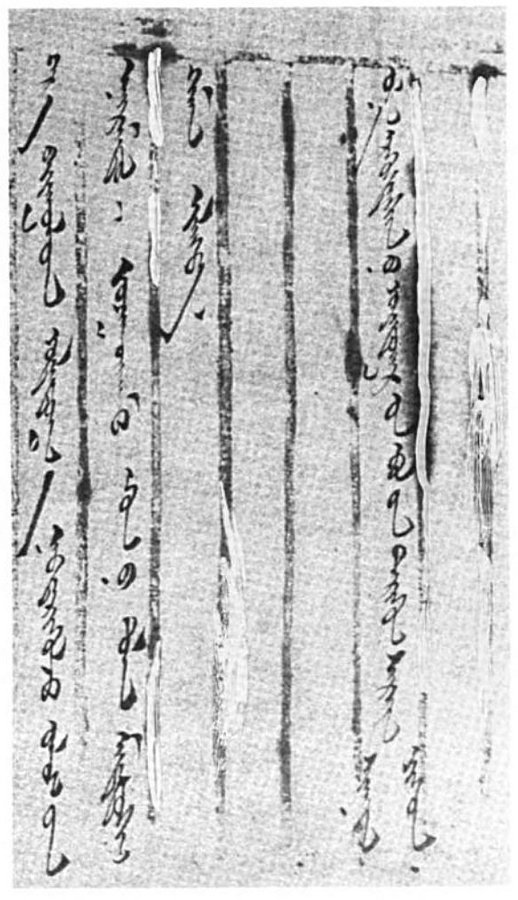
Letter to foreign ministries declaring Mongolia's independence.

The delegation to St. Petersburg brought with it a letter signed in the name of the Khutuktu and the "four khans of Khalkha." It asked for assistance against the Chinese, including arms, and implied that Russian troops would be needed against a Chinese unit which the Mongolians believed was at that moment advancing into Mongolia. To coax a commitment, the Mongols promised economic concessions in return. The letter itself was unclear as to the specific type of relationship the Mongols wished to establish with Russia. Russia wanted to include Outer Mongolia in its sphere of influence and as a buffer state offering protection from China and Japan, but never planned to make it a part of her empire. The Russian government decided to support, by diplomatic rather than by military means, not full independence for Mongolia, but autonomy within the Qing empire. It did, however, increase its consular guard in Urga to protect the returning delegation.

The Russian minister in Beijing was then instructed to inform the Qing government that the Mongols had sent a delegation to St. Petersburg complaining of Chinese immigration, military build-up, and administrative reorganization. He stated that Russia could not but be concerned about these developments, in view of the common boundary shared with Khalkha, and cautioned that China would have to bear the consequences if this warning were ignored.

On learning of the Mongolian mission to Russia, the Qing government instructed Sando to investigate. Sando immediately summoned the head of the Khutukhtu's ecclesiastical administration (Ikh shav'), the Erdene Shanzav, and demanded an explanation. The Erdene Shanzav, pleading that he had not been involved, revealed the entire plot. Sando then demanded that the Khutuktu withdraw his request for Russian troops. The Khutuktu agreed, provided that Sando dismantle the New Administration. Sando cabled to Beijing for instructions, and was told that parts of the New Administration could be delayed.

Sando ordered the princes in Urga to sign a statement that only a few individuals had been responsible for the appeal to Russia. The princes did give such a declaration, but only orally. Sando then ordered the Mongolians to have no further contact with the Russian consulate, threatening in case of disobedience to bring an additional 500 troops to Urga and to arm the Chinese population in the city. He posted sentries around the Khutuktu's palace with orders to bar Russian visitors. And he sent a contingent of troops to the Russian-Mongolian border to intercept the Mongolian delegation to Russia on its return.

=== Declaration of independence ===
Events of historic proportions were then taking place in China proper. On October 10 there was an uprising in Wuchang and a revolution against the minority ruling class had begun. One province after another declared its independence from the Qing authority. Believing that his position was untenable, Sando wired the Beijing government asking for permission to resign, but his request was denied. In the meantime, the Mongolian delegation to Russia secretly returned, and reported the results of its trip to a group of princes and lamas. They composed a joint memorial to the Khutukhtu asking what Mongolia should do in lieu of the provincial uprisings. He advised that Mongolians form a state of their own.

=== Establishment of the government ===
Buoyed by the Khutuktu's support and by the impending collapse of the Qing dynasty, the Provisional Government of Khalkha was formed, headed by some prominent Khalkha nobles. On November 28, the government ordered all four provinces (aimag) of Khalkha to mobilize a thousand soldiers each. Almost immediately 500 men from the neighboring khoshuuns had gathered in Urga. Two days later, Sando received a letter, signed in the name of the nobles and lamas of Khalkha, stating that they had heard of a secessionist movement in China, and that Chinese troops of the "revolutionary party" were preparing to march on Urga from Inner Mongolia. The letter went on to state that, in view of the benefit obtained by the Khalkhas from the Qing in the past, the Khutuktu had ordered the mobilization of 4000 troops to advance on Beijing to defend the Emperor. Sando was asked to provide these men with provisions and arms. He was given three hours to reply. No reply came. Abandoning this thin deception, a delegation of nobles and lamas visited the amban's office, and informed him of their decision to declare independence and to install the Khutuktu as emperor. Sando pleaded with the delegation. He admitted that what had come to pass was the result of his own folly, and he promised to recommend full autonomy for Mongolia, but not independence. The delegation curtly replied that it had come simply to deliver a message, not to debate it. Sando was ordered to leave the country within 24 hours.

There was little Sando could do. He had only 150 troops, who in any event were in a refractory mood because of arrears in back pay. On the following day, his soldiers were disarmed by Mongolian militiamen, as well as Russian Cossacks of the consular convoy under command of Grigory Semyonov, future Ataman. Sando and his staff moved into the compound of the Russian consulate for their own safety.

On 30 November 1911 the Mongols established Temporary Government of Khalkha. On December 1, the Provisional Government of Khalkha issued a general proclamation announcing the end of Qing rule and the establishment of a theocracy under the Jebtsundamba Khutuktu.

=== Enthronement of the Bogd Khan ===
On December 29, the Khutuktu was formally installed as the Bogd Khan ("Great Khan", or "Emperor") of the new Mongolian state. This ushered in Bogd Khan era. While all Barga, Dariganga, Khovd, Huvsgul region, 26 hoshuns of Ili region (Dzungarian Oirads), 24 hoshuns from Upper Mongolian 29 hoshuns, 35 hoshuns from the Inner Mongolian 49 hoshuns sent statements to support Bogd Khan's call of Mongolian reunification, in reality however, most of them were too prudent or irresolute to attempt joining the Bogd Khan regime.

On December 5, Sando left Mongolia with Russian escort. Chinese authority in the rest of the country collapsed quickly after that. Later that month or in January 1912 (sources differ) the Military Governor of Uliastai in western Mongolia, his staff and military guards, peacefully departed under the protection of Cossack troops.

=== Battle ===
The Deputy Military Governor of Khovd of the Qing Empire decided to resist to the Mongolian Revolution, hoping for reinforcements from Xinjiang. The troops came too late: the town was surrounded by Mongolian troops, and the reinforcement detachment was crushed. In August 1912, his stronghold was overcome by Mongolian troops, and he and his staff were escorted out of the country by Cossacks. After this battle, the entire Outer Mongolia was liberated from the Qing regime.

== Leaders and main figures ==
- Tögs-Ochiryn Namnansüren - Outer Mongolia
- Da Lam Tserenchimed - Outer Mongolia
- Eighth Jebtsundamba Khutugtu - Outer Mongolia
- Jalkhanz Khutagt Sodnomyn Damdinbazar - Outer Mongolia
- Mijiddorjiin Khanddorj - Outer Mongolia
- Manlaibaatar Damdinsüren-Barga Mongolia, military leader
- Khatanbaatar Magsarjav - Outer Mongolia, military leader
- Bayantömöriin Khaisan - Inner Mongolia
- Togtokh Taij - Inner Mongolian Gorlos chieftain, battled against Chinese.
- Sumiya beis - Chahar chieftain of Ili region (Dzungaria), he came in Mongolia with 271 people.
- Hurleg beis - delegate of Upper Mongols
- Udai van - Inner Mongolia, he wrote Eastern Mongolian Declaration of Independence in 1913.
- Bavuujav - Inner Mongolian Harchin chieftain, battled against Chinese until 1915.

== Role of Russia ==
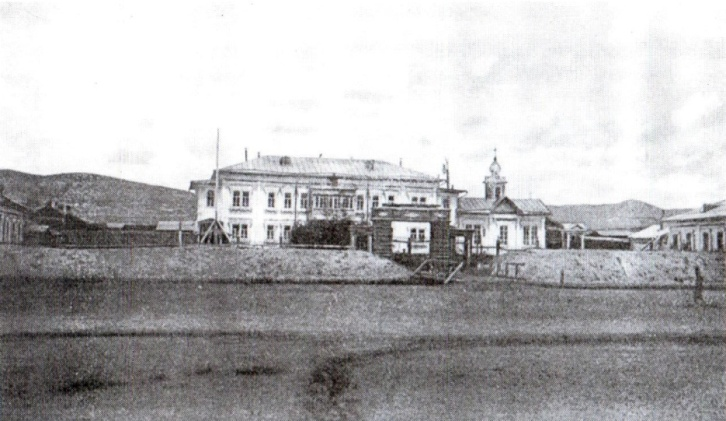
The Russian Consulate in Khüree

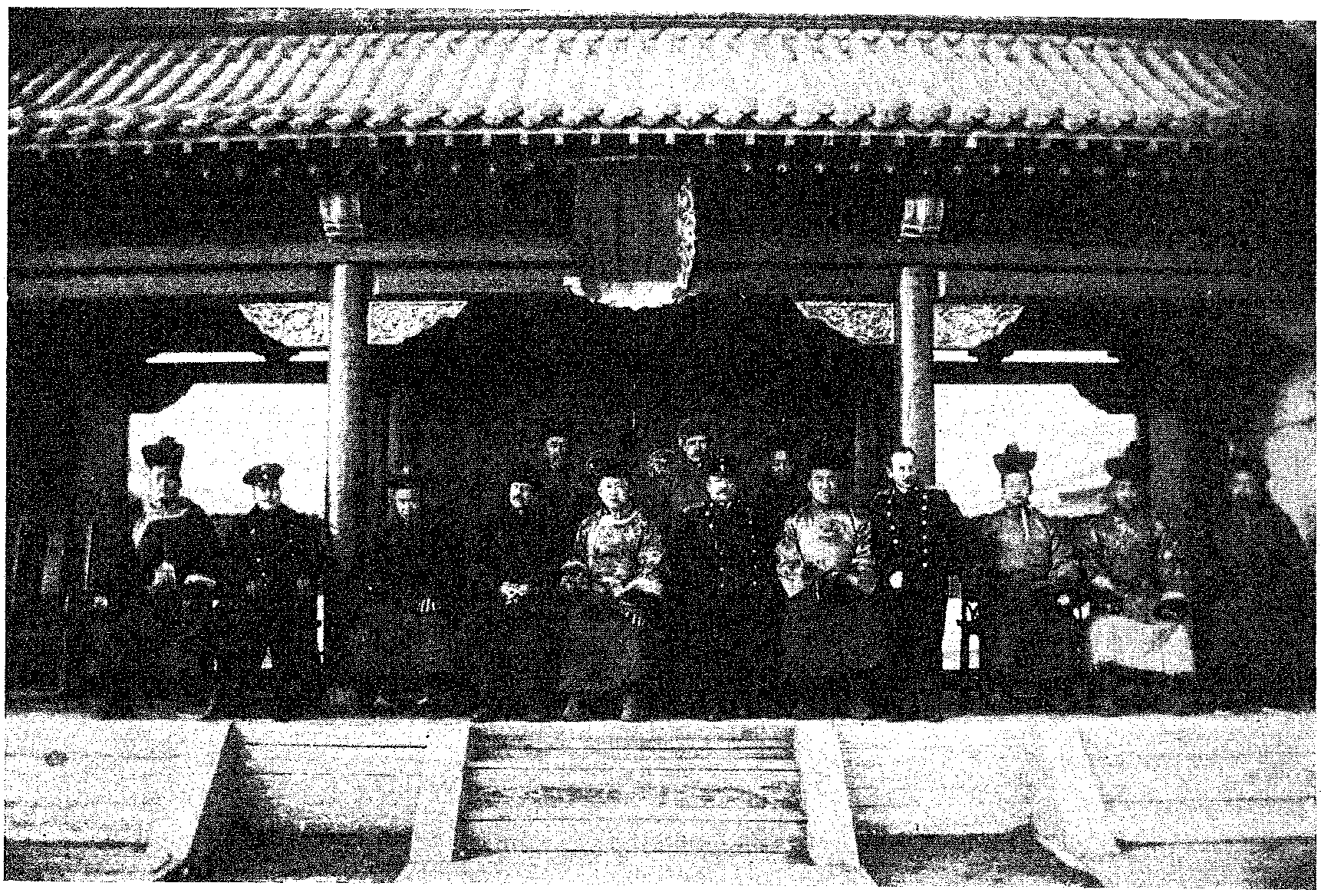
Group of Russian and Mongolian officials, photo taken after the signing of the Russo-Mongol agreement in Urga in November 1912. Russia cautiously recognizes the autonomy of Mongolia and obtains trade concessions.

The Mongolian revolution was for the most part an orderly transference of power, due to the realism of Qing authorities in Mongolia, and in no small part to the presence of Russian troops, who provided protection for these authorities and Chinese troops.

The role of the Russians in this revolution (and later in the revolution of 1921) has been controversial. Chinese historians especially have often explained the events of 1911 as the product of "Tsarist provocations and manipulations". This conclusion however contradicts with archival materials from Russia and Mongolia. The movement for independence in Outer Mongolia was to a large extent the reaction to the new Qing policies aimed at assimilating the Mongols by Han Chinese. The Russian imperial government preferred to see Outer Mongolia as a buffer state against Chinese and Japanese influences on the Russian borders in Siberia, a dependent state or an autonomous region of China. The revolution also reflected a growing sense of nationalism on the part of the Mongolians, and their desire to form a nation state, political and social forces that were at work in China at that time as well.

The situation was different in Inner Mongolia. There, Chinese authorities remained in power, even though Mongol activists were preparing to join Outer Mongolia in independence. Members of the pro-Qing Royalist Party were known to support the independence of Inner Mongolia, and some argued for a monarchist state covering Manchuria as well as Outer and Inner Mongolia. Most notably, Gungsangnorbu, leader of the Inner Mongolian Harqin Banner, forged close contacts with the Japanese in December 1911. He and other inner Mongolian princes took loans, promised the Japanese mining rights and received major arms shipments.

== See also ==
- Xinhai Revolution
- Battle of the Five Routes
- Mongolian Revolution of 1921, the transition from theocratic monarchy to communism
- Mongolian Revolution of 1990, the transition from communism to democracy
- Mongolia under Qing rule
- Bogd Khanate of Mongolia
- Occupation of Mongolia
- Independence Day (Mongolia)
