= Mongolian Revolution =

Mongolian Revolution may refer to:

- The Mongolian Revolution of 1911
- The Mongolian Revolution of 1921
- The Mongolian Revolution of 1990
