= Navaandorjiin Jadambaa =

Mongolian president in 1924

- Наваандоржийн Жадамбаа
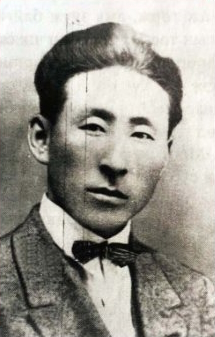

1st Chairman of the State Great Khural
- In office 28 November 1924 – 29 November 1924
- Preceded by: Bogd Khan (as Khagan); Balingiin Tserendorj (acting)
- Succeeded by: Peljidiin Genden

Personal details
- Born: 1900 Bator-Van, Outer Mongolia, Qing China (now Selenge Province, Mongolia)
- Died: 1939 (aged 38–39) Mongolia
- Party: Mongolian People’s Revolutionary Party (1921–1928)

Navaandorjiin Jadambaa (Mongolian: Наваандоржийн Жадамбаа; sometimes spelled Jadamba in English) (1900–1939) was a Mongolian communist politician and revolutionary during the late Bogd Khanate and the early socialist era. He briefly served as the first republican head of state of socialist Mongolia after the death of Bogd Khan.

In 1922, Jadambaa co-founded the Mongolian Revolutionary Youth Union with the writer S. Buyannemeh. Throughout the 1920s, he took up a variety of governmental positions, including deputy chairman of the Mongolian People's Revolutionary Party's Central Committee (1924–1928), chairman of the Revolutionary Youth Union's Central Committee, minister of economics, editor of the newspaper People's Army (Mongolian: Ардын цэрэг), and deputy board chairman of the Mongolian-Soviet Joint Stock Bank. He became Acting Chairman of the State Great Hural in November 1924 following the death of the Bogd Khan, as he was replaced by Peljidiin Genden only a day later. Assuming office at the age of 24, he would hold the record for youngest non-royal head of state until Jean-Claude Duvalier became president of Haiti in 1971 at the age of 19.

According to the politician and analyst Bat-Erdene Batbayar, Jadambaa "was responsible for establishing contacts with the USA, Germany and Great Britain", whereas his colleague Tseren-Ochiryn Dambadorj kept in touch with Japan and China. They hoped to establish Mongolia as a neutral and diplomatically recognized state, but came under attack within their own party ranks because of their perceived rapprochement with the capitalist powers.

At the MPRP's Seventh Congress (1928), Jadambaa was dismissed from all his posts after being accused of "Right Opportunism". He was exiled to the Soviet border town of Kyakhta in 1929. In the subsequent years, he managed to obtain an economics degree in Moscow, but was unable to return to Mongolia. He did a number of jobs in Moscow, possibly as an engineer at a footwear factory, and translated works by Boccaccio, Swift and Andersen into Mongolian. He was officially expelled from the MPRP in 1931. In 1937 or 1938, under the Choibalsan regime, he was arrested and sentenced to 10 years imprisonment for antistate activities. He died of illness while imprisoned in an unknown location in 1939.

Jadambaa was posthumously rehabilitated in 1968 and regained his party membership in 1990.

Preceded by The Bogd Khan	Head of State; November 28, 1924 – November 29, 1924	Succeeded by Peljidiin Genden
