= Mijiddorjiin Khanddorj =

Mongolian aristocrat and politician (1869–1915)

Prince of the Blood Mijiddorjiin Khanddorj
- Мижиддоржийн Ханддорж
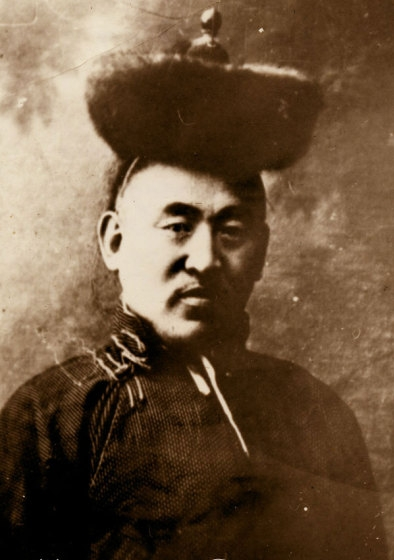

Minister of Foreign Affairs
- In office 1911–1913
- Monarch: 8th Bogd Gegeen Jebtsundamba Khutuktu
- Succeeded by: Balingiin Tserendorj

Prince of Erdene Daichin
- In office 1892–1915
- Preceded by: Rinchindorjin Tserendorj
- Succeeded by: Khanddorjin Jambaldorj

Personal details
- Born: 1869 Tüsheet Khan Aimag, Outer Mongolia, Qing
- Died: 1915 (aged 45–46) Khuree, Bogd Khanate of Mongolia

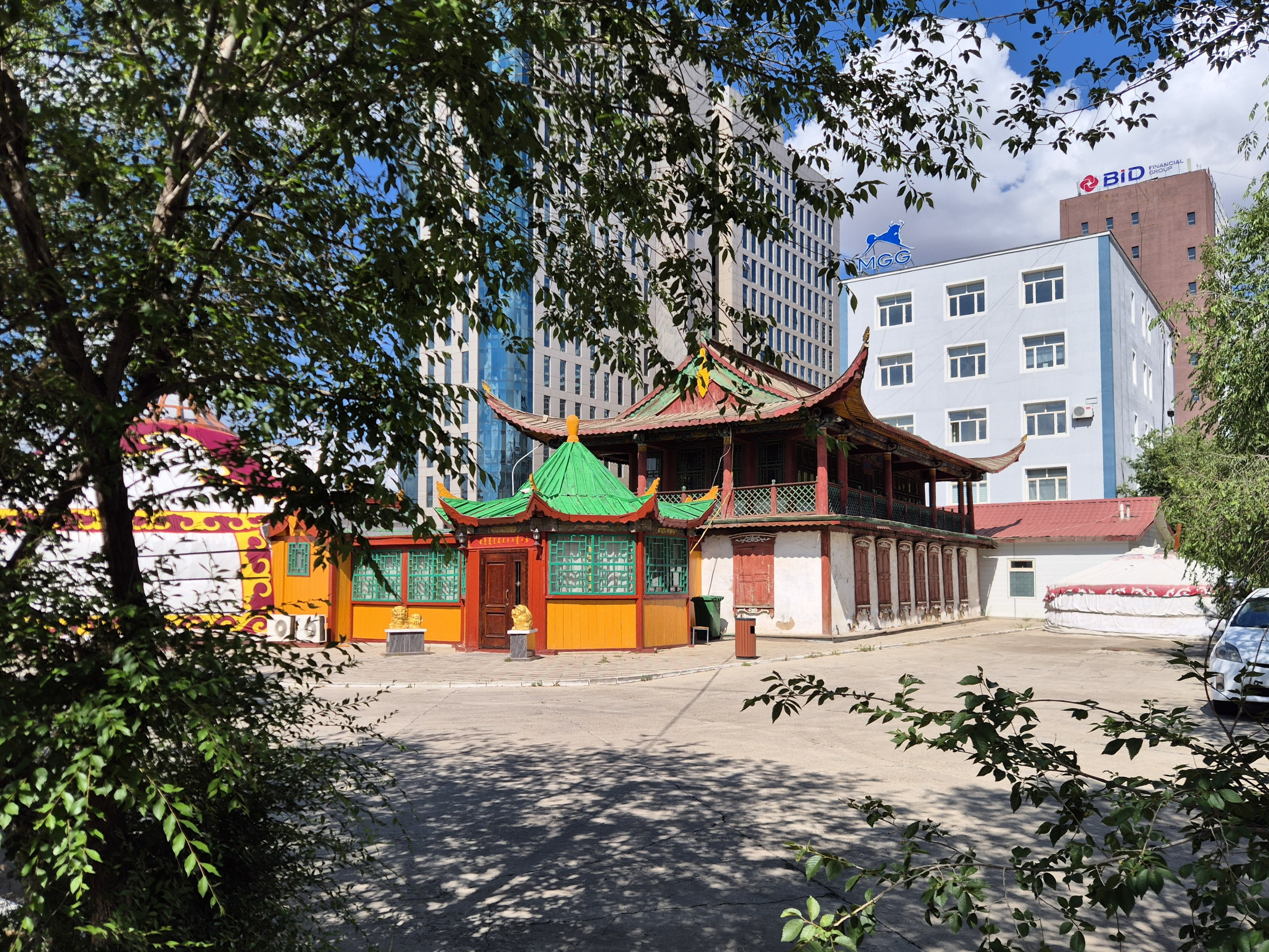
Khanddorj's house in Ulaanbaatar - a mix of Russian and Chinese influences

Mijiddorjiin Khanddorj (Mongolian: Мижиддоржийн Ханддорж, Tibetan: མི་བསྐྱོད་རྡོ་རྗེ་ཡི། མཁའ་འགྲོ་རྡོ་རྗེ།, Wylie: mi bskyod rdo rje yi mkha' 'gro rdo rje; 1869 – 1915), also known by his title Chin Van, or Chin Wang (prince) Khanddorj, was an aristocrat and prominent early 20th-century Mongolian independence leader. He served as the first minister of foreign affairs of the Bogd Khanate of Mongolia in the government of the Bogd Khan from 1911 to 1913 and founded the nation's diplomatic service. He died, allegedly poisoned, in 1915.

Khanddorj was born in 1869 in present-day Bulgan Province, the grandson of Tserendorj, military governor of Tüsheet Khan Province. Khanddorj became assistant military governor of the province at age 21 in 1892 and then full commander from 1897 to 1900. Growing up in an enlightened aristocratic family, he studied Old Mongolian, Manchu and Chinese languages and later learned Russian.

In 1904, Khanddorj invited the 13th Dalai Lama to stay at his residence the Wang Monastery (present-day Bulgan city) as the Tibetan spiritual leader crossed Mongolia to seek Russian support against the British following Francis Younghusband's British expedition to Tibet. The Dalai Lama was later accompanied on his journey to Beijing by Khanddorj's son Danzanjamts (Данзанжамц), who was subsequently executed by Qing authorities for violating protocol. Khanddorj's resentment of Qing rule in Outer Mongolia intensified.

In 1910 Khanddorj was invited to Ikh Khüree to become an advisor to the Khalkha Mongol Buddhist spiritual leader the 8th Bodg Gegeen Jebtsundamba Khutuktu. Dissatisfied with Beijing's "New Administration Policy" on governing Mongolia, Mongolia's spiritual leader the Jebtsundamba Khutuktu and several noble princes including Khanddorj, Tögs-Ochiryn Namnansüren, Da Lam Tserenchimed and others discussed the possibility of independence in earnest and in the summer of 1911 met in a secret congress to plot further strategy. The Khutuktu was persuaded to send a delegation headed by Khanddorj to Russia to seek assistance. In Saint Petersburg Khanddorj asked for Russia's help, to include the provision of arms, in protecting Mongolia's fledgling independence against Chinese incursions, and implied that Russian troops would be needed against a Chinese unit which the Mongolians believed was at that moment advancing into Mongolia. The Russian government decided to support, by diplomatic rather than by military means, not full independence for Mongolia, but autonomy within the Qing dynasty. In 1911, he was a Chinese legislator for the Advisory Council, however resigned his post.

As the Qing dynasty began to collapse in the fall of 1911 following the uprising in Wuchang, Mongol officials moved to fill the vacuum. On December 1, the Provisional Government of Khalkha issued a general proclamation announcing the end of Qing rule and the establishment of a theocracy under the Jebtsundamba Khutuktu. In the new independent government, Khanddorj was appointed minister of foreign affairs but an internal power struggle erupted almost immediately between Khanddorj and Minister of Internal Affairs Da Lam Tserenchimed over whose ministry would hold more prestige. At the end of 1912 Khanddorj headed another delegation to St. Petersburg, this time to secure diplomatic relations between the newly independent Mongolia and the Russian Empire which resulted in the 1912 Russian-Mongolian treaty.

Khanddorj was a strong Russophile and under his initiative the School of Russian Translators was opened in Urga in 1912. However, he was distrusted by a number of high officials in the Bogd Khan's government, especially Gonchigjalzangiin Badamdorj, minister of religion and state, who complained to the Bogd Khan about Khanddorj's alleged treasonable inclinations. As a result, in 1913 Khanddorj was removed as head of the Foreign Ministry and was not a member of the government delegation at the Treaty of Kyakhta conference in 1915. Soon after, Khanddorj was allegedly assassinated, dying of poisoning after attending a reception at the Bogd Khan's residence.
