= Uyanga, Övörkhangai =

District in Övörkhangai Province, Mongolia

Coordinates: 46°27′32″N 102°16′51″E

Uyanga District Уянга сум ᠤᠶ᠋ᠠᠩᠭ᠋᠎ᠠᠰᠤᠮᠤ
- District
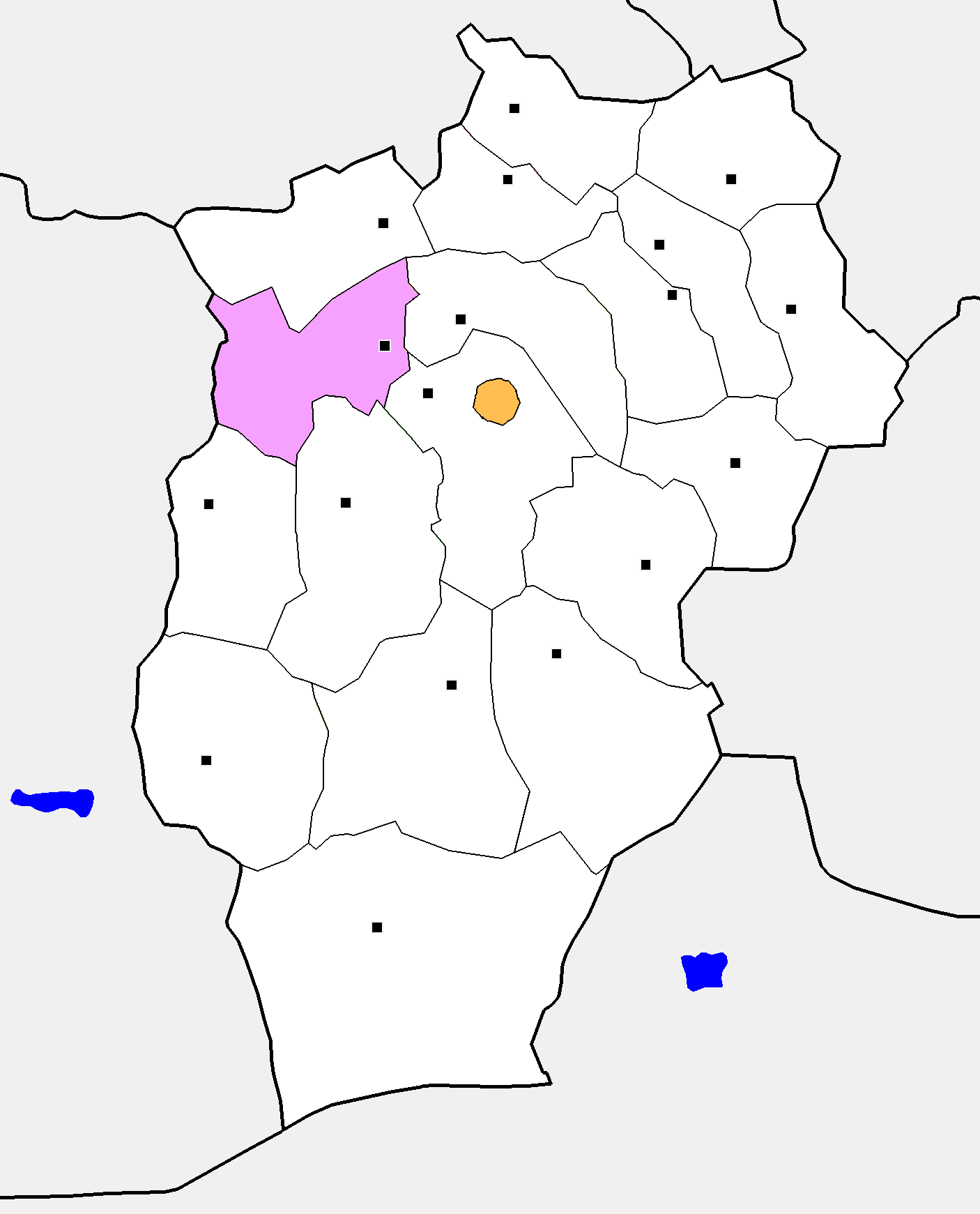
- Uyanga District in Övörkhangai Province
- Country: Mongolia
- Province: Övörkhangai Province
- Time zone: UTC+8 (UTC + 8)

Uyanga (Mongolian: Уянга "Melody") is a sum (district) of Övörkhangai Province in southern Mongolia. In 2008, its population was 9,581.

== Administrative divisions ==
The district is divided into eight bags, which are:

- Badral
- Buuruljuut
- Jargalant
- Ongi
- Shivee-Ovoo
- Shuranga
- Taats
- Ult
