= Da Lam Tserenchimed =

Lama and Mongolian independence leader (1872–1914)

- Да Лам Цэрэнчимэд ᠳᠠ ᠯᠠᠮ᠎ᠠ ᠰᠡᠷᠡᠩᠴᠢᠮᠡᠳ
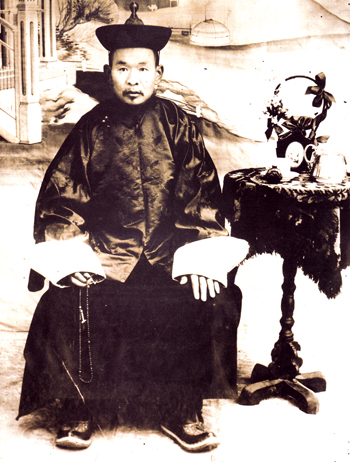
- Tserenchimed in 1913

Acting Prime Minister of Mongolia
- In office 29 December 1911 – July 1912
- Preceded by: Position established
- Succeeded by: Tögs-Ochiryn Namnansüren

Personal details
- Born: 1872 Khövsgöl Province, Outer Mongolia, Qing dynasty
- Died: 7 May 1914 (aged 41–42) Khovd, Mongolia

Da Lam Tserenchimed (Note: Mongolian: ᠳᠠ ᠯᠠᠮ᠎ᠠ ᠰᠡᠷᠡᠩᠴᠢᠮᠡᠳ, Cyrillic:Да лам Цэрэнчимэд; Standard Tibetan: ཏཱ་བླ་མ་ཚེ་རིང་འཆི་མེད།; Chinese: 車林齊密特) (1872 – 7 May 1914) was a prominent lama and an early 20th-century Mongolian independence leader. In December 1911, he was appointed interior minister and de facto prime minister in the Bogd Khan's first government of the Bogd Khanate of Mongolia, a position he held until Tögs-Ochiryn Namnansüren officially became the first prime minister in July 1912.

== Early life and career ==
Tserenchimed was born in 1872 in Zorigt Wang khoshuu of Tüsheet Khan aimag (present-day Lün sum of Töv Province). He entered a monastery at an early age, became a lama, and then started work as a low-level clerk in the office of the Shamzudba (the Secular Affairs Administration office) of the estates of the Bogd Khan (Ikh Shavi), quickly climbing his way up to become Da Lam (Chief Lama or Abbot). He showed a talent for politics early on and established excellent working relations with local political officials. Around this time, he began to support calls for Mongolian independence.

In July 1911, Tserenchimed was one of several high-ranking lamas and hereditary princes summoned by the Bogd Khan to Khüree (present-day Ulaanbaatar) to discuss independence. The Bogd Khan then named him a member of a delegation, along with Tögs-Ochiryn Namnansüren, Bayantömöriin Khaisan, and Mijiddorjiin Khanddorj, that traveled to Saint Petersburg to seek Tsarist Russian and Western European support for Mongolian independence from Chinese rule.

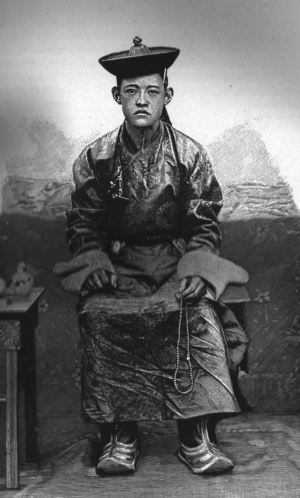
The young Bogd Khan

Outer Mongolia declared independence from the Qing dynasty on 29 December 1911, during the Xinhai Revolution. The only commoner in Bogd Khan's government, he was then appointed interior minister in the first government of the newly established Bogd Khanate of Mongolia in 1911, a position that was recognized as a de facto prime ministry, until the establishment in July 1912 of the office of prime minister and appointment of Namnansüren to the position in November 1912.

Tserenchimed had established close ties to the Chinese Kuomintang nationalists and the Japanese. In 1913, he attempted to travel to Tokyo to seek Japanese recognition of Mongolian independence and assistance in uniting northern and southern Mongolians but was turned back at Harbin by Russian officials.

In 1914, he was removed from his position as minister of interior and reassigned to be minister for pacification of western frontier. He died a short while later while traveling out to the western frontier to take up his new position.
