= Manlaibaatar Damdinsüren =

Mongolian military commander and diplomat (1871–1921)

- Манлайбаатар Дамдинсүрэн
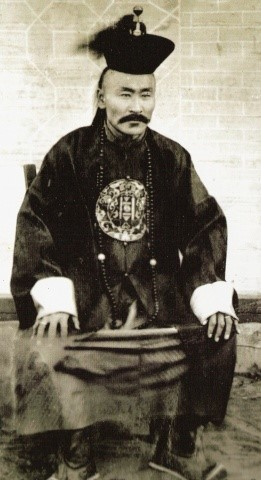
- Manlaibaatar Damdinsüren
- Born: Jamsrangiin Damdinsüren; March 13, 1871
- Died: January 27, 1921 (aged 49)
- Military career
- Allegiance: Mongolia

Manlaibaatar Damdinsüren (Mongolian: Манлайбаатар Дамдинсүрэн, first hero Damdinsüren, Standard Tibetan: རྟ་མགྲིན་སྲུང་།; March 13, 1871 – January 27, 1921), born Jamsrangiin Damdinsüren (Жамсрангийн Дамдинсүрэн), was a military commander, Pan-Mongolist and diplomat who led Mongolia's struggle for independence in 1911.

A Barga Mongol, Damdinsüren was born on March 13, 1871, in Hulunbuir, Inner Mongolia. At the age of seven he began to learn Manchu and Mongolian writing. In 1908 he officially inherited his father's rank Zhang. While visiting the imperial court in Beijing he met with Prince Mijiddorjiin Khanddorj with whom he first broached the idea of overthrowing the Manchu domination of Outer Mongolia.

In 1911 he and other Mongolian nobility and high ranking Buddhist lamas participated in a secret congress in Ikh Khüree convened by Mongolia's religious leader, the Jebtsundamba Khutuktu, to formulate a declaration of independence from Manchu Chinese rule. Once the declaration was issued, Damdinsüren helped mobilize thousands of soldiers, seized the northern Inner Mongolian city of Hailar and offered his allegiance to the Bogd Khan. Under the Bogd Khan's government he served as counselor first class of the ministry of the army and then Deputy Minister of Foreign Affairs. In August 1912, his forces combined with those of Khatanbaatar Magsarjav and Ja Lama to liberate the city of Khovd in western Mongolia from Chinese occupation, for which he received the honorary title of Manlaibaatar ("Leader hero") and the princely title "beyle."

On February 2, 1913 Damdinsüren was one of the signatories to the Treaty of friendship and alliance between the Government Mongolia and Tibet in which the two countries declared mutual recognition and allegiance. Later that month he commanded troops (including a young Darizavyn Losol) in a series of battles against Chinese forces in Inner Mongolia around Mongolia's south east border that climaxed in an unsuccessful assault on the city of Hohhot.

From September 1914 to June 1915, Damdinsüren represented the interests of Inner Mongolia at Russian-Chinese-Mongolian negotiations that resulted in the 1915 Treaty of Kyakhta which outlined, among other issues, Mongolia's geopolitical status.

In 1919, Damdinsüren began a rapprochement with the Mongolian revolutionaries. Damdinsuren said "I can defend Mongolia from China and Red Russia" after Chinese occupation of 1919. He was arrested by Chinese occupation authorities in the autumn of 1920. In prison, he was tortured by Chinese authorities for 107 days, but never kneeled down to the Chinese, and in fact died standing up in prison in Niislel Khüree in January 1921.

Manlaibaatar Damdinsüren street in Ulaanbaatar is named in his honor.
