= Treaty of Kyakhta (1915) =

1915 treaty between Russia, Mongolia, and China

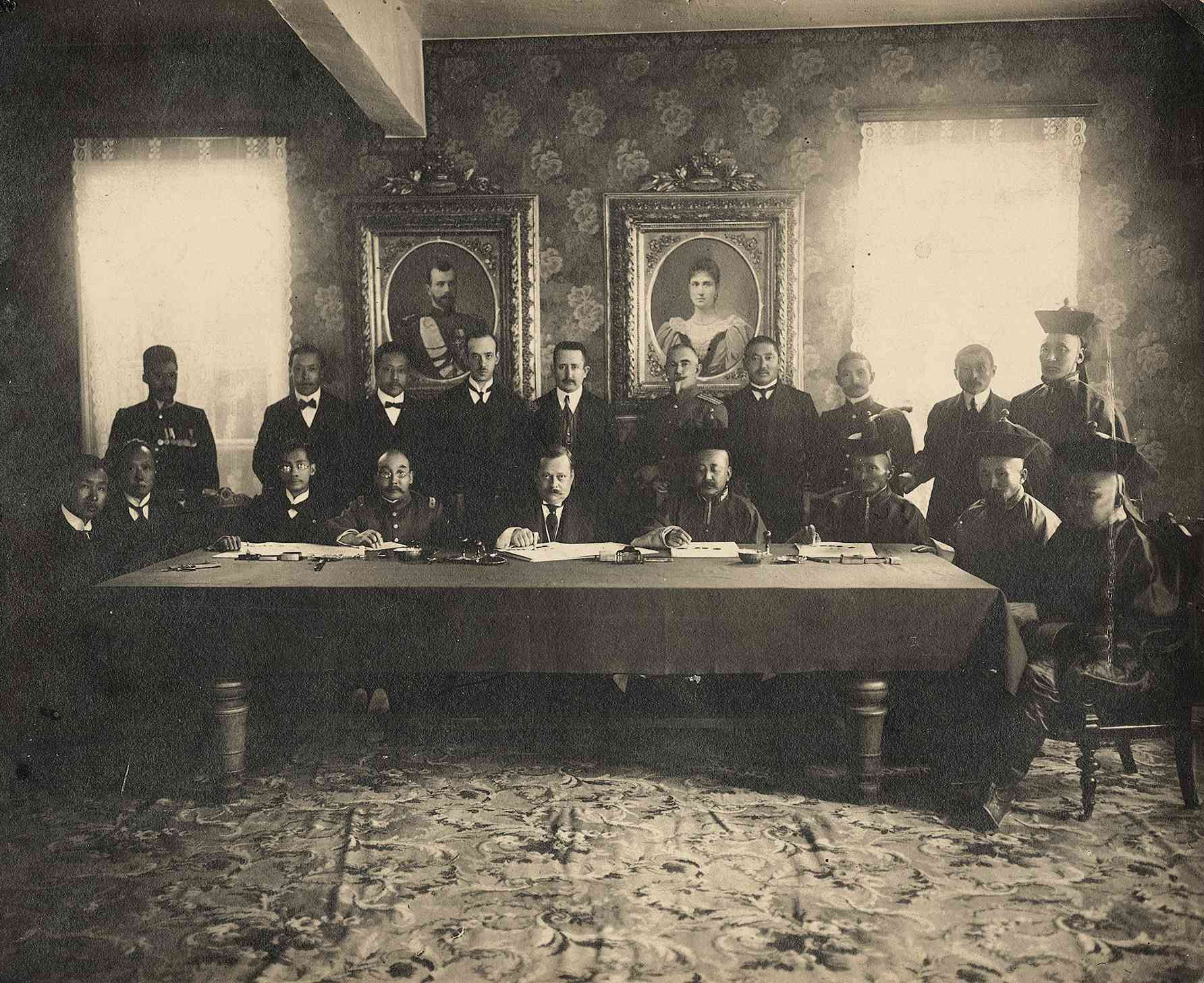
- Signing of the Treaty
- Signed: 7 June 1915
- Location: Kyakhta, Russian Empire
- Parties: Russian Empire; Republic of China; Bogd Khanate of Mongolia
- Ratifiers: Emperor Nicholas II; President Yuan Shikai; Bogd Khan

The Treaty of Kyakhta (Mongolian: Хиагтын гэрээ; Russian: Кяхтинский договор; Chinese: 中俄蒙協約) was a tri-party treaty signed on 7 June 1915 among Russia, Mongolia, and China.

Russia and China recognized Outer Mongolia's autonomy (as part of Chinese territory); Mongolia recognized China's suzerainty; Mongolia could not conclude international treaties with foreign countries regarding political and territorial questions.

The Mongolian representative, Prime Minister Tögs-Ochiryn Namnansüren, was determined to stretch autonomy into de facto independence, and to deny the Chinese anything more than vague, ineffectual suzerain powers. The Chinese sought to minimize, if not to end, Mongolian autonomy.

Mongolians viewed the treaty as a disaster because it denied the recognition of a truly independent, all-Mongolian state. Nevertheless, Outer Mongolia remained effectively outside Chinese control and, according to explanation by baron B.E. Nolde, the Director of Law Section of the Russian Foreign Ministry, had all necessary attributes of the state in the international law of that time.

The treaty severely curtailed the independent status of Mongolia declared in 1911, but eventually became moot after the October Revolution of 1917, and the Mongolian Revolution of 1921.

== See also ==
- Mongolian Revolution of 1911
- Occupation of Mongolia
- Simla Accord (1914)
- Sino-Soviet Treaty of Friendship and Alliance
