= Tögs-Ochiryn Namnansüren =

Borjigin Khan and First Prime Minister of Mongolia

- Төгс-Очирын Намнансүрэн ᠲᠡᢉᠦᠰ-ᠸᠴᠢᠷ ᠤ᠋ᠨ ᠨᠠᠮᠨᠠᠩᠰᠦ᠋ᠷᠦᠩ
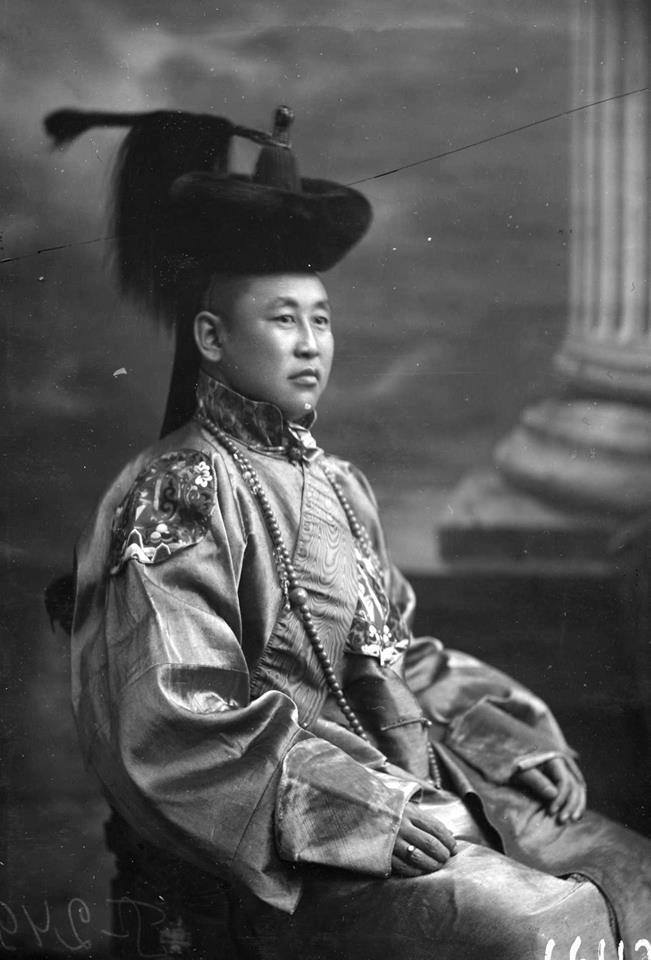
- Portrait of Namnansüren in the Government Palace

1st Prime Minister of Mongolia
- In office November 1912 – April 1919
- Preceded by: Da Lam Tserenchimed (as de facto Prime Minister); Position established
- Succeeded by: Gonchigjalzangiin Badamdorj

Chairman of the State Great Khural
- In office February 1914 – April 1919

Sain Noyon Khan
- In office 1896–1919
- Preceded by: Tserendondoviin Tögs-Ochir
- Succeeded by: Namnansüreniin Batsükh

Personal details
- Born: 1878 Sain Noyon Khan, Outer Mongolia, Qing dynasty (modern day Uyanga district, Övörkhangai Province, Mongolia)
- Died: April 1919 (aged 40–41) Uyanga, Bogd Khanate of Mongolia

Tögs-Ochiryn Namnansüren (Note: Mongolian: Төгс-Очирын Намнансүрэн, IPA: [tʰɵ́xs‿ɔt͡ɕʰɪríɴ námnəɴsurɘɴ]) (1878 – April 1919), known by his full title Sain Noyon Khan Namnansüren, (Note: Mongolian: Сайн ноён хан Намнансүрэн, IPA: [sɛ́ɴ nɔ́ɪɴ χáɴ námnəɴsurɘɴ]) was a hereditary prince and prominent early 20th-century Mongolian independence leader. He served as the first prime minister of Mongolia under the Bogd Khan from 1912 until 1915, when the office of prime minister was abolished. He was subsequently appointed Minister of the Army.

== Biography ==
Namnansüren, a direct descendant of Onokhui Üizen Noyan, the third son of Gersenji Khongtaiji of the Jalayir, who was himself a son of Dayan Khan a descendant of Genghis Khan was born in 1878 in present-day Uyanga district of Övörkhangai Province. In 1896 he became prince, or “khan”, of Sain Noyon Khan Province, one of the four Khalkh Mongol provinces established by the Qing dynasty. He was the 13th holder of the hereditary title Sain Noyon, a lineage tracing back to Tumenkhen Sain Noyon in the early 17th century. In 1728, the Qing court formally ennobled his ancestor Tsering as a khan equal in rank to the other Khalkha khans, separating the domain from the Tusheet Khanate; thereafter the territory became known as the Sain Noyon Khanate. He married in 1900.

In 1911, Namnansüren persuaded Mongolia's religious leader Bogd Khan to call a congress of Mongol princes and high-ranking lamas in Khüree to initiate independence from China. The Bogd Khan then dispatched him to Saint Petersburg in July 1911 as part of a delegation to seek Russian and West European support for Mongolian independence.

The Bogd Khan appointed Namnansüren prime minister in July 1912, replacing Da Lam Tserenchimed who, as Minister of Internal Affairs, had acted as de facto head of government since the elevation of the Bogd Khan as national leader in December 1911. Other members of the Bogd Khan's government included the Da Lam Tserenchimed (Minister for Internal Affairs), Mijiddorjiin Khanddorj (Minister for Foreign Affairs), Dalai-Van Gombosuren (Defense Minister), Gadinbalyn Chagdarjav (Finance Minister), and Erdene Van Namsrai (Minister of Justice).

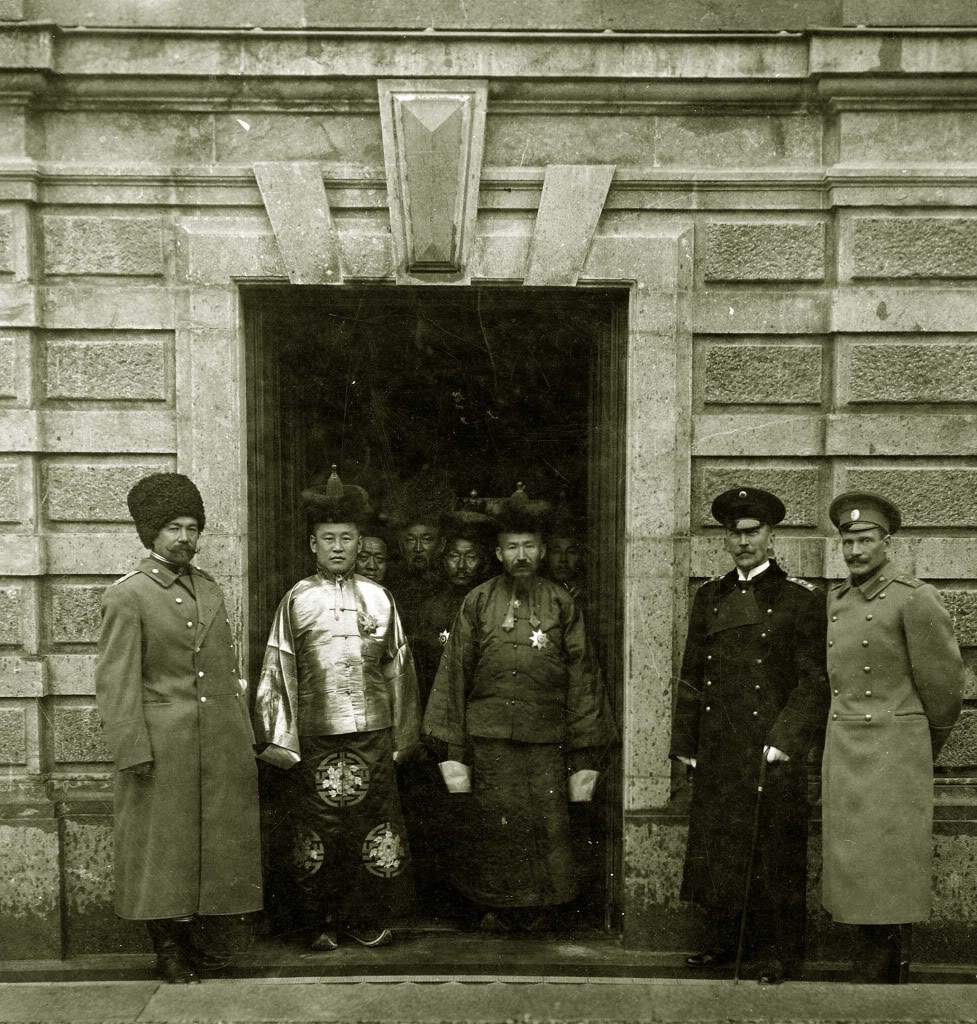
Namnansüren's delegation in St. Petersburg

From November 1913 to January 1914 Namnansüren lead another delegation to St. Petersburg, this time to represent Mongolian interests during negotiations between Russia and China surrounding the tripartite Kyakhta treaty that would define the border between Russian Siberia and the Qing territories of Mongolia and Manchuria. Mongolian hopes for international recognition of its independence and support for a union between Inner and Outer Mongolia were ultimately dashed when the agreement re-confirmed the country's official status as an autonomous region within China. While in Russia, Namnansüren attempted to contact ambassadors from several western countries (the United States, Great Britain, France, and Germany) and to organize a trip to Western Europe to gain international support for Mongolia's independence but was prevented from doing so by Russian officials.

Having failed to obtain any of his objectives, Namnansüren found his political influence to have diminished upon his return to Mongolia in 1914. In 1915 the Bogd Khan abolished the office of prime minister and Namnansüren was appointed minister of war. In June 1918, faced with increased threats from the Chinese who were demanding Mongolia renounce its Pan-Mongolia ambitions and sign a decree 'voluntarily' relinquishing autonomy, Namnansüren again traveled to Russia, this time to Irkutsk, to seek Russian assistance. There he met with two Bolshevik representatives in what is believed to be the first meeting between Soviet and Outer Mongolian officials. The Bolsheviks, preoccupied with the revolution and the ongoing civil war in Russia, failed to offer much in the way of assistance.

Not long after his return home, Namnansüren fell seriously ill and died sometime in April 1919. Many suspected he was assassinated by poisoning, along with many other figures involved in the revival of Mongolia's independence who apparently died premature deaths. Shortly thereafter the Chinese warlord Xu Shuzheng occupied Niislel Khüree and installed the more pliable Gonchigjalzangiin Badamdorj as prime minister.

In 1914 the Mongolian Namnansüren is known to have brought some films from Russia to show at the residence of the Bogd Khan. These are the first known film showings in Mongolia.

== Notes ==
Royal titles
| Preceded by Tserendondovyn Tögs-Ochir | Prince of Sain Noyon; 1896 - 1919 | Succeeded by Namnansürenyn Batsükh |
Political offices
| Preceded by none | Prime Minister of Mongolia; 1912 - 1915 | Succeeded by Gonchigjalzangiin Badamdorj |
