= Bogd Khan =

1911–1924 ruler of the Bogd Khanate of Mongolia

Bogd Khan Богд Хаан ᠪᠣᠭᠳᠠ ᠬᠠᠭᠠᠨ
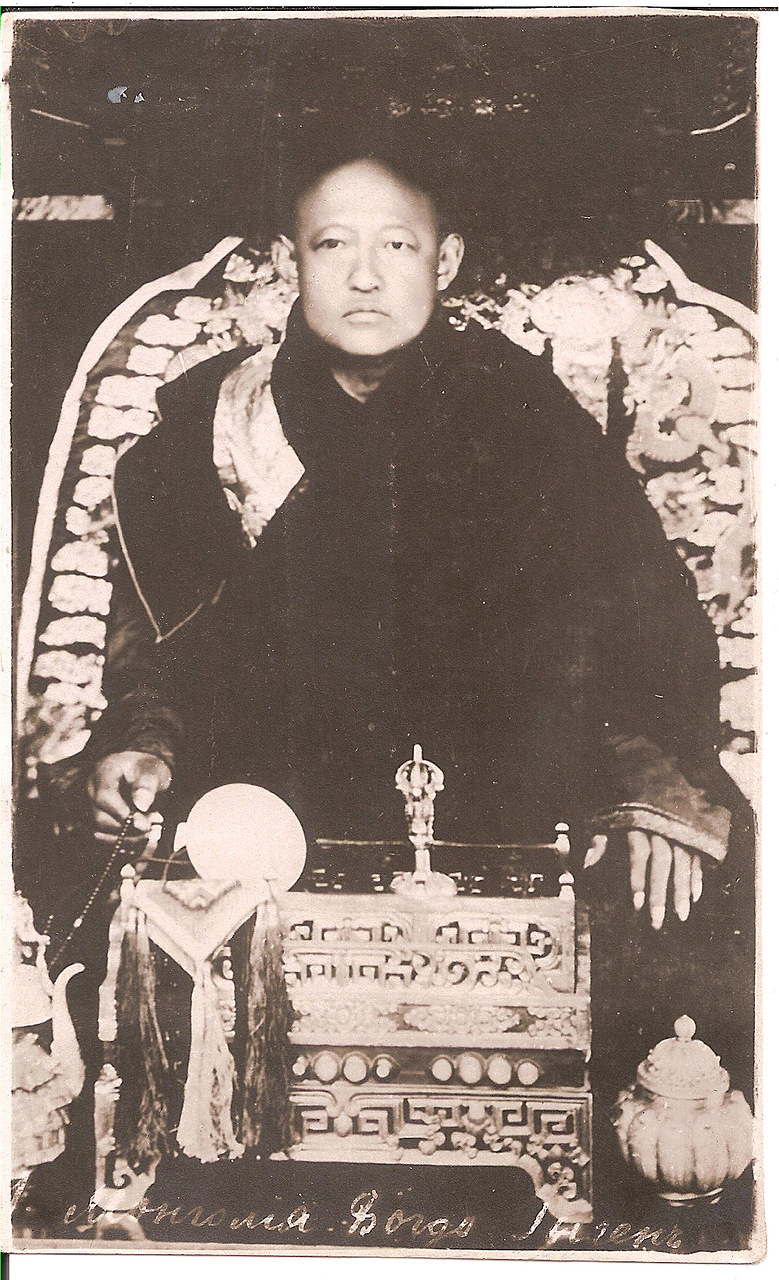
- Photograph of Bogd Khan

Khagan of Mongolia
- Reign: 29 December 1911 – 20 May 1924
- Predecessor: Sando (as Amban of Outer Mongolia)
- Successor: Navaandorjiin Jadambaa (as Chairman of the State Great Khural)

8th Jebtsundamba Khutughtu
- Reign: 1870–1924
- Predecessor: Agvaanchoijivanchugperenlaijamts
- Successor: Jambalnamdolchoijijantsan
- Born: Agvaanluvsanchoijinyam Danzan Vanchüg; 13 October 1869; Lhasa, Tibet, China
- Died: 20 May 1924 (aged 54); Niislel Khüree, Bogd Khanate of Mongolia
- Spouse: Tsendiin Dondogdulam (m. 1902; died 1923) Genepil (m. 1923)
- Issue: Luvsanjambyn Mördorj (adopted)
- Seal (Note: See also: Imperial Seal of the Mongols.)

Bogd Khan (Note: Mongolian: Богд хаан, romanized: Bogd khaan, ᠪᠣᠭᠳᠠ ᠬᠠᠭᠠᠨ, IPA: [ˈpɔχt χaːɴ]; Chinese: 博克多汗; pinyin: Bókèduō hàn) (Note: Fully known as Богд Живзундамба Агваанлувсанчойжинямданзанванчүг, Bogd Jivzundamba Agvaanluvsanchoijinyamdanzanvanchüg, IPA: [ˈpɔχt ˈtɕʲiwtsʊ̆ɴˌtampă aʁˈwaɴɮʊwsăɴˌtɕʰɔe̯tɕĭnʲɛmˌtaɴtsăɴˌwaɴtɕʰuk]) (13 October 1869 – 20 May 1924) was the khan of the Bogd Khanate of Mongolia from 1911 to 1924, following the state's de facto independence from the Qing dynasty of China after the Xinhai Revolution. Born in Tibet, he was the third most important person in the Tibetan Buddhist hierarchy as the 8th Jebtsundamba Khutuktu, below only the Dalai Lama and Panchen Lama, and therefore also known as the "Bogdo Lama". He was the spiritual leader of Tibetan Buddhism in the Bogd Khaganate. His wife Tsendiin Dondogdulam, the Ekh Dagina ('Dakini Mother'), was believed to be a manifestation of White Tara.

== Biography ==
The future Bogd Khan was born in 1869 in the area of Lhasa, in a family of a Tibetan official. He was born as Agvaan Luvsan Choijinnyam Danzan Vanchüg. His father, Gonchigtseren, was an accountant at the 12th Dalai Lama's court. The boy was officially recognized as the new incarnation of the Bogd Gegen in Potala in the presence of the 13th Dalai Lama and the Panchen Lama. The new Bogd Gegen arrived in Urga, the capital of Outer Mongolia, in 1874. After this he lived only in Mongolia.

As a result, from his young years the 8th Bogd Gegen was the subject of intrigues of Qing officials in Urga. Later he became the subject of propaganda campaigns organised by Mongolian communists, which attacked him by alleging that he was a prolific poisoner, a paedophile, and a libertine, which was later repeated in belles-lettres and other non-scientific literature (e.g. James Palmer). However, analysis of documents stored in Mongolian and Russian archives does not confirm these statements.

As a monk, the Bogd had limited access to physical means of imposing power, though some enemies were executed for blasphemy. The Polish traveller Ferdinand Ossendowski recorded that he knew "every thought, every movement of the Princes and Khans, the slightest conspiracy against him, and the offender is usually kindly invited to Urga, from where he does not return alive. Ossendowski's claims for his acquaintance with the Bogd Gegen were not confirmed by comparative analysis of his book and manuscripts.

By the spring of 1911, some prominent Mongolian nobles including Prince Tögs-Ochiryn Namnansüren persuaded the Jebstundamba Khutukhtu to convene a meeting of nobles and ecclesiastical officials to discuss independence. The Khutukhtu consented. To avoid suspicion, he used as a pretext the occasion of a religious festival, at which time the assembled leaders would discuss the need to reapportion taxes among the khoshuuns. The meeting occurred on July 10 and the Mongolians discussed independence. The assembly became deadlocked, some arguing for complete, others for partial, resistance. Eighteen nobles decided to take matters into their hands. Meeting secretly in the hills outside of Urga, they decided that Mongolia must declare its independence. They then persuaded the Khutuktu to send a delegation of three prominent representatives—a secular noble, an ecclesiastic, and a lay official —to Russia for assistance. The particular composition of the delegation—a noble, a cleric, and a commoner—may have been intended to invest the mission with a sense of national consensus.

On 1 December, the Provisional Government of Khalkha issued a general proclamation announcing the establishment of a theocracy under the Jebtsundamba Khutuktu. On 29 December, the Khutuktu was formally installed as the Bogd Khan of the new Mongolian state.

The Bogd Gegen lost his power when Chinese governance was restored in 1919. The Tusiyetu Khan Aimak's Prince Darchin Ch'in Wang was a supporter of Chinese rule while his younger brother Tsewang was a supporter of Ungern-Sternberg. When Baron Ungern's forces failed to seize Urga in his 1920 invasion, the Bogd was placed under house arrest; then he became a puppet of Ungern shortly before he took Urga in 1921. After the revolution in 1921 led by Damdin Sükhbaatar, the Bogd Khan was allowed to stay on the throne in a limited monarchy until his death in 1924, a year after that of his wife.

== Legacy ==
The government took control of the Bogd Khan's seal after his death according to the 26 November 1924 Constitution of the Mongolian People's Republic.

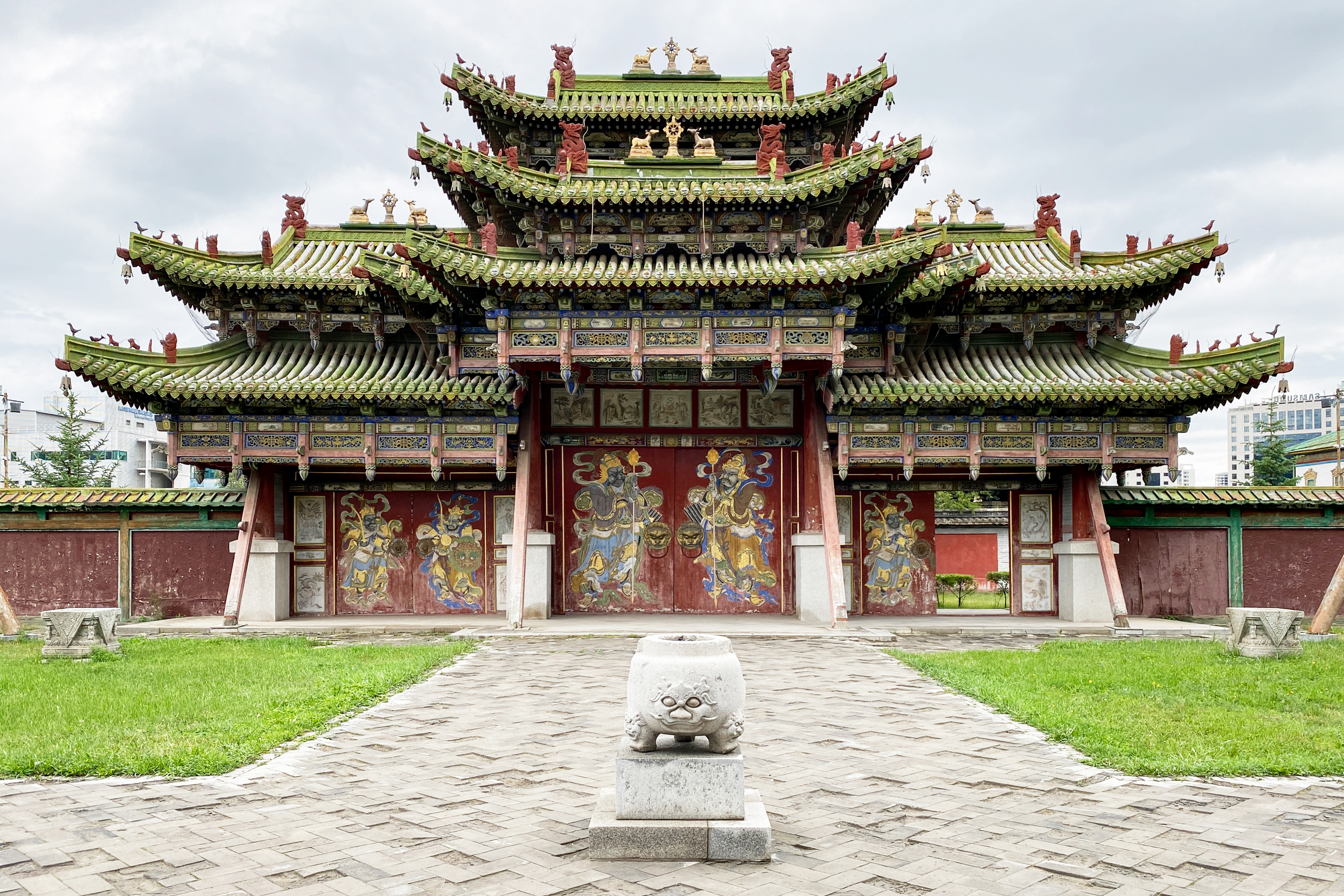
The Green Palace in Ulan Bator

It was proposed that Zhang Zuolin's domain (the Chinese "Three Eastern Provinces") take Mongolia under its administration by the Bogda Khan and Bodo in 1922 after pro-Soviet Mongolian Communists seized control of Northern Mongolia.

After his death, the Mongolian Revolutionary government, led by followers of the Soviet Communists, declared that no more reincarnations were to be found and established the Mongolian People's Republic. However, rumors about a reincarnation of the Jebtsundamba Khutuktu appeared in Mongolia in that same year. No traditional determination of the supposed incarnation was conducted. Another rumor appeared in 1925. In November 1926 the 3rd Great Khural of Mongolian People's Republic approved a special resolution that searches for reincarnations of the Bogd Gegen should not be allowed. A final prohibition was approved by the 7th Congress of the Mongolian People's Revolutionary Party and the 5th People's Great Khural in 1928.

Nevertheless, the next reincarnation of Bogd Gegen was found in Tibet as a boy born in 1932 in Lhasa. This was not announced until the dissolution of the Soviet Union and democratic revolution in Mongolia. The 9th Jebtsundamba Khutughtu was formally enthroned in Dharamsala by the 14th Dalai Lama in 1991, and in Ulaanbaatar in 1999.

The Green Palace, Yellow Palace, Brown Palace, and White Palace were the four main residences in Urga, the capital. The Green Palace has been preserved and is a tourist attraction in Ulaanbaatar.

== See also ==
- Khan
- Bogda Khan
- Mongolian Revolution of 1911
- Bogd Khanate of Mongolia
- Mongolian Revolution of 1921

== Notes ==
Bogd Khan Born: c. 1869 Died: 20 May 1924
Regnal titles
Preceded by Khevt Yos Khan	Khagan of Mongolia; 29 December 1911 – 1919; 1921 – 20 May 1924	Vacant Republic declared
Religious titles
Preceded by Ngawang Chökyi Wongchuk Trinley Gyatsho	8th Jebtsundamba Khutuktu; 1870 – 20 May 1924	Vacant Title next held by Jampal Namdröl Chökyi Gyaltsen
