= Buddhism in Mongolia =

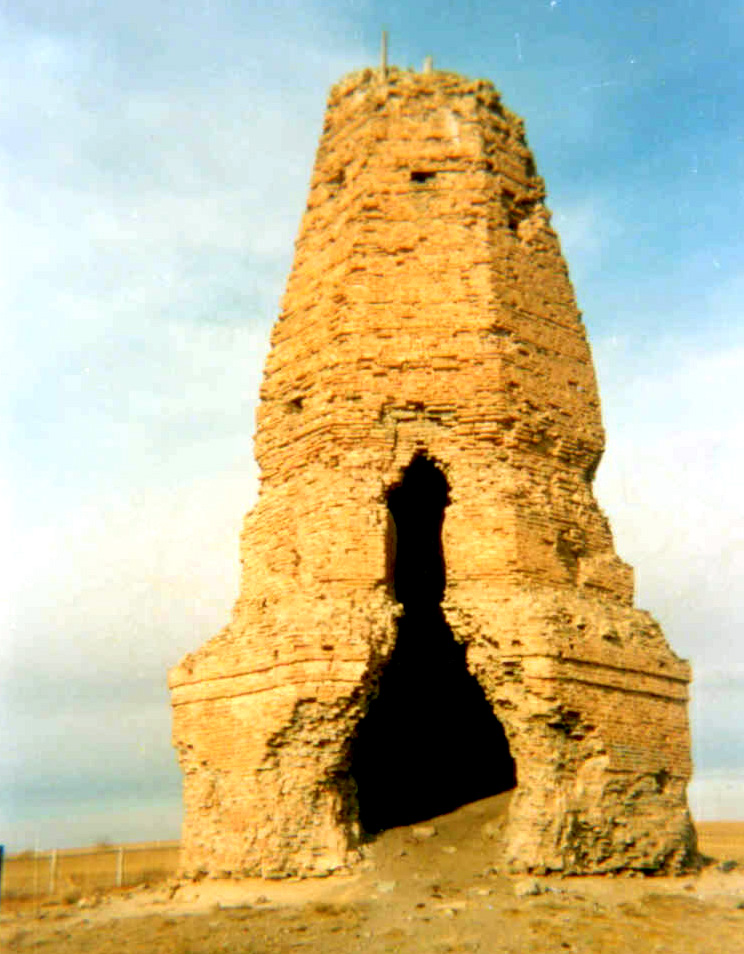
Stupa in the Khitan city of Bars-Hot, Dornod Province

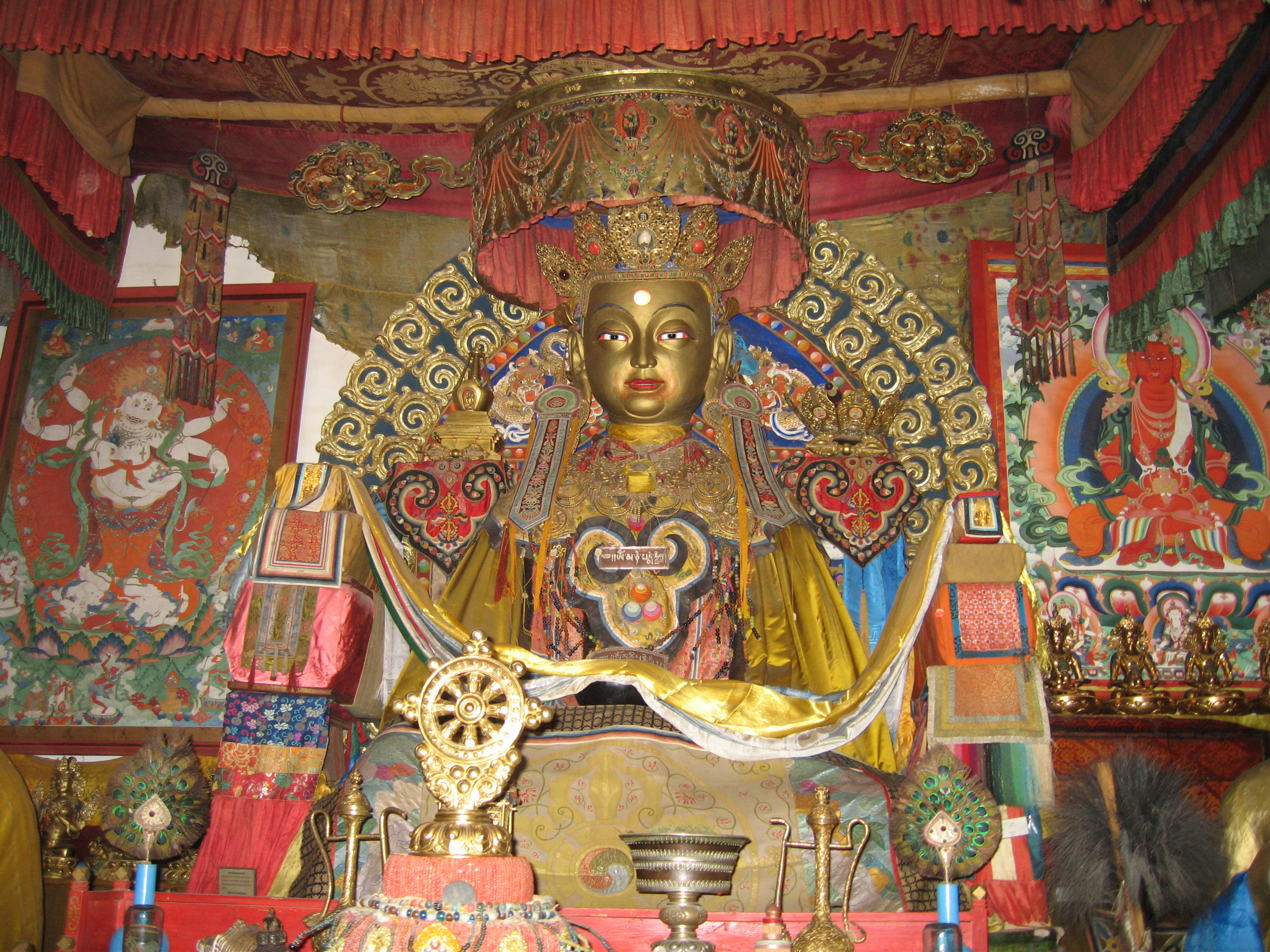
Buddha statue in the Erdene Zuu Monastery, Karakorum

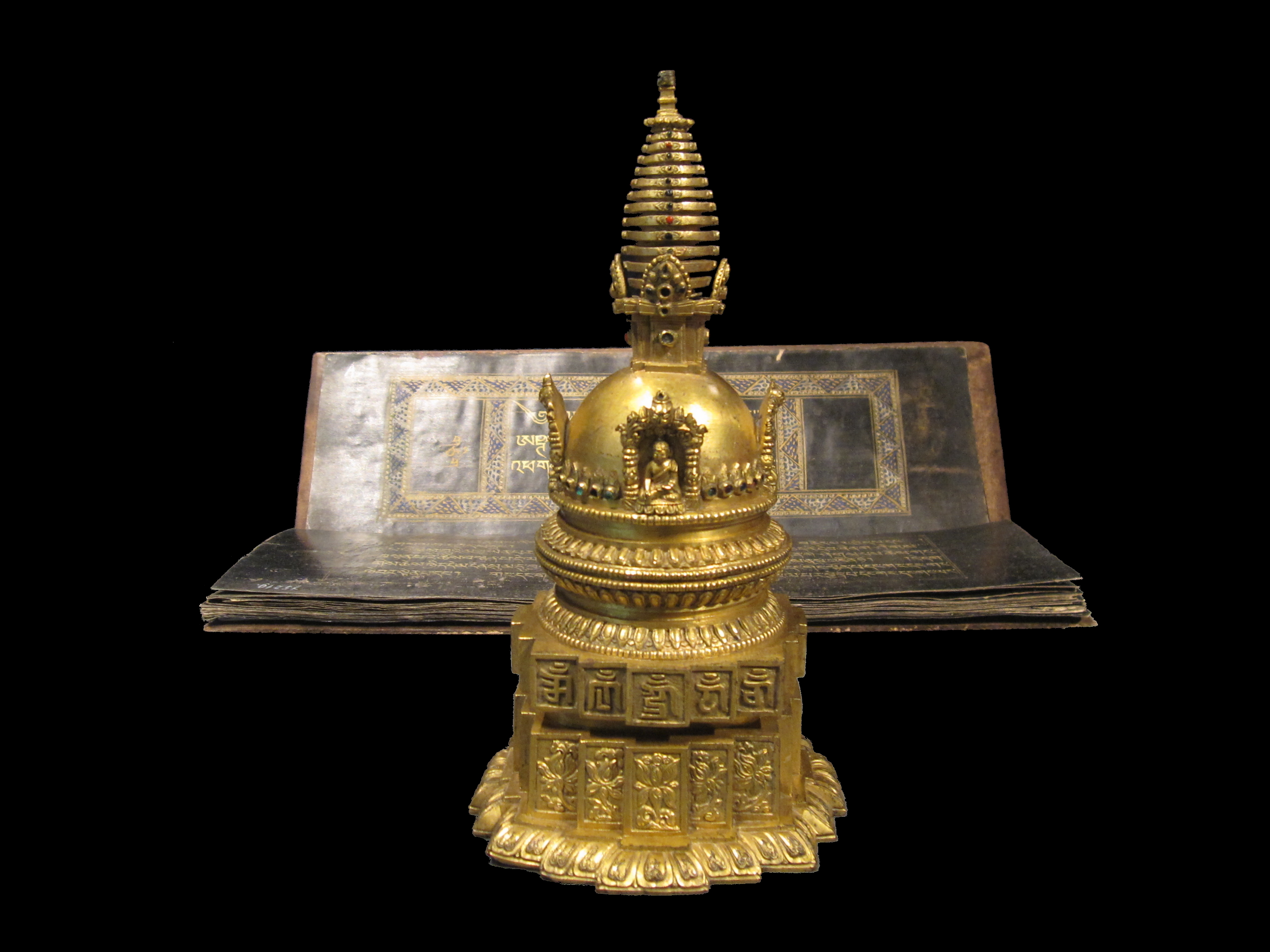
Gilded stupa and a prajnaparamita, Mongolian from the 18th century CE

Buddhism is the largest religion in Mongolia practiced by 51.7% of Mongolia's population, according to the 2020 Mongolia census, or 58.1%, according to the Association of Religion Data Archives. Buddhism in Mongolia derives much of its recent characteristics from Vajrayana Tibetan Buddhism of the Gelug and Kagyu lineages, but is distinct and presents its own unique characteristics.

Vajrayana Buddhism in Mongolia began with the Yuan dynasty (1271–1368) emperors' conversion to Tibetan Buddhism. The Mongols returned to shamanic traditions after the collapse of the Mongol Empire, but Buddhism reemerged in the 16th and 17th centuries.

== Characteristics ==
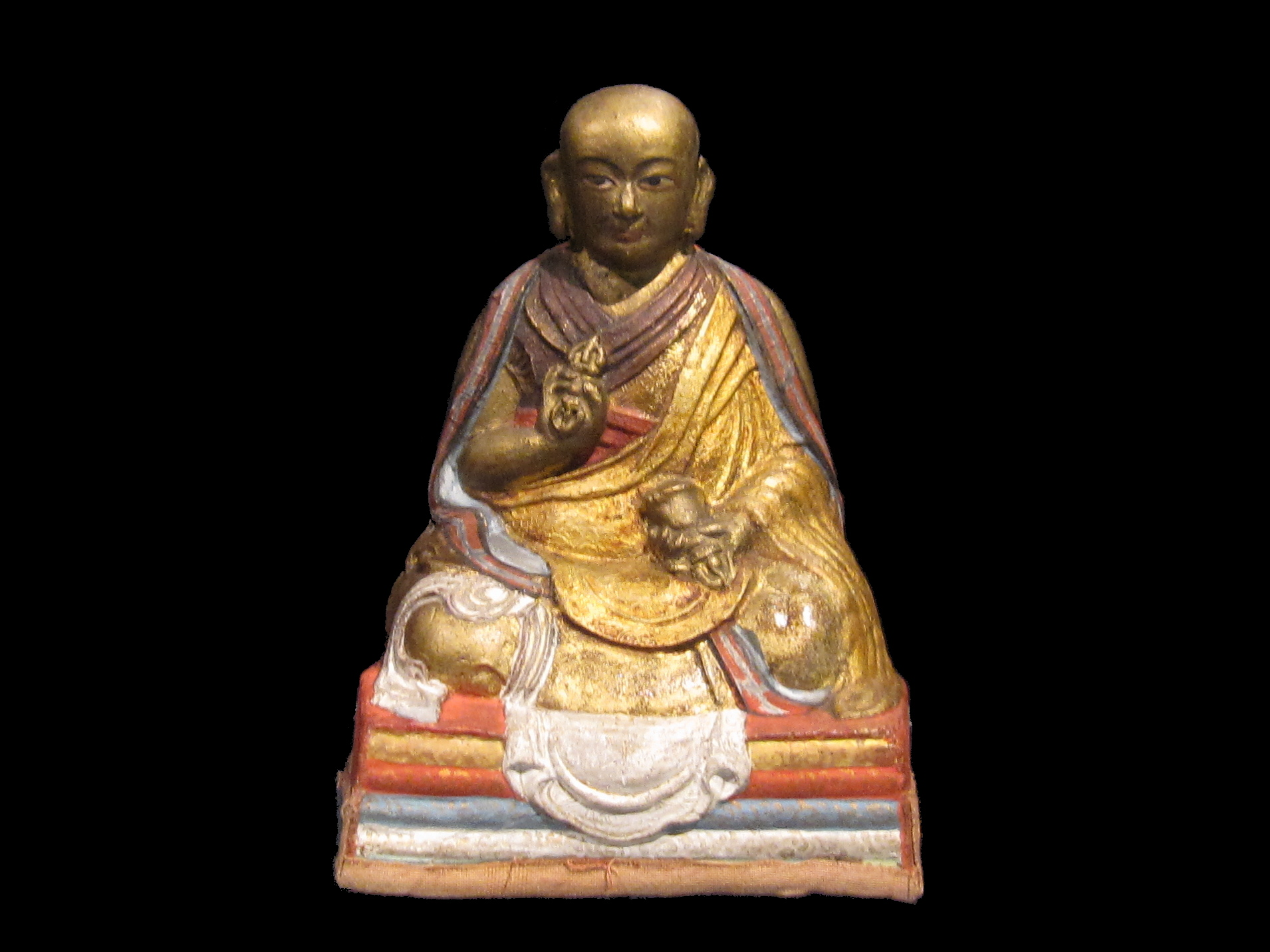
Statuette of Zanabazar, one of the most influential tulkus of Mongolia

Buddhism in Mongolia derives many of its recent characteristics from Tibetan Buddhism of the Gelug and Kagyu lineages, but is distinct and presents its own unique characteristics. Traditionally, the Mongolian ethnic religions involved worship of Heaven (the "eternal blue sky") and ancestors and the ancient North Asian practices of shamanism, in which human intermediaries went into trance and spoke to and for some of the numberless infinities of spirits responsible for human luck or misfortune.

== History ==
=== Nomadic empires (first millennium CE) – first introduction ===
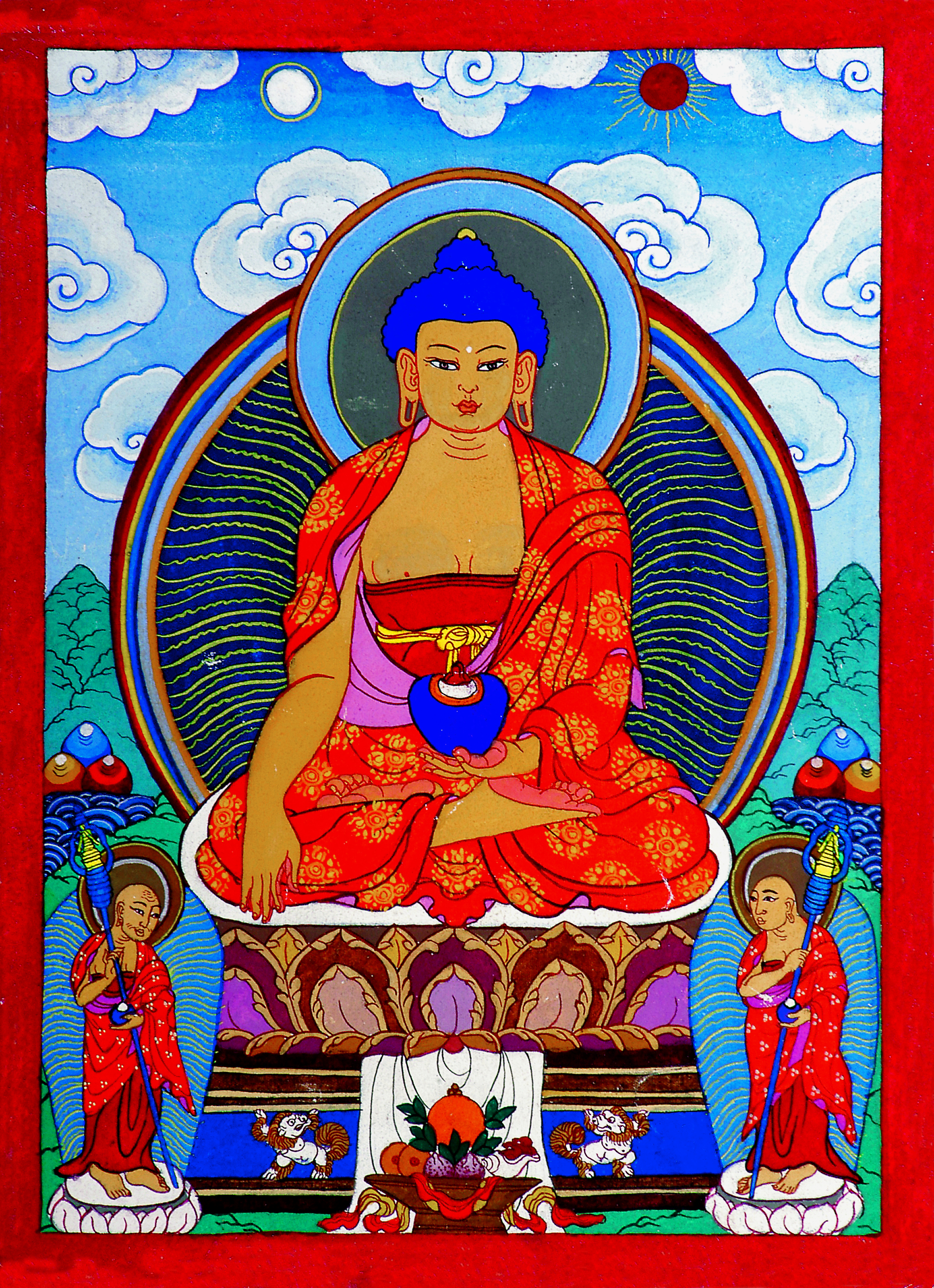
Buddha by Mongolian artist, Otgonbayar Ershuu

The earliest introduction of Buddhism into the Mongolian steppes took place during the periods of the nomadic empires. Buddhism penetrated Mongolia from Central Asia as early as the 1st century CE. Many Buddhist terms of Sanskrit origin were adopted via the Sogdian language.

The rulers of the nomadic empires such as the Xiongnu (209 BC – 93 CE), Xianbei (93–234), Rouran Khaganate (late 4th c. – middle 6th c.) and the Göktürks (middle first mill. CE) received missionaries and built temples for them. Buddhism prevailed among aristocrats and was patronised by the monarchs of the Xianbei-led Northern Wei dynasty (386–535) and of the Khitan-led Liao dynasty (916–1125). The Khitans aristocracy regarded Buddhism as the culture of the Uyghur Khaganate that dominated the Mongolian steppes before the rise of the Liao dynasty. The monarchs of the Jurchen-led Jin dynasty (1115–1234) also regarded Buddhism as part of their culture.

The oldest known Mongolian language translations of Buddhist literature were translated from the Uyghur language and contain Turkic language words like sümbür tay (Sumeru Mountain), ayaγ-wa (a dative form of ayaq, a Uyghur word meaning honor), quvaray (monk) and many proper names and titles like buyuruγ and külüg of 12th-century Turkic origin.

=== Mongol Empire and Yuan dynasty (13th–14th century) – second introduction ===
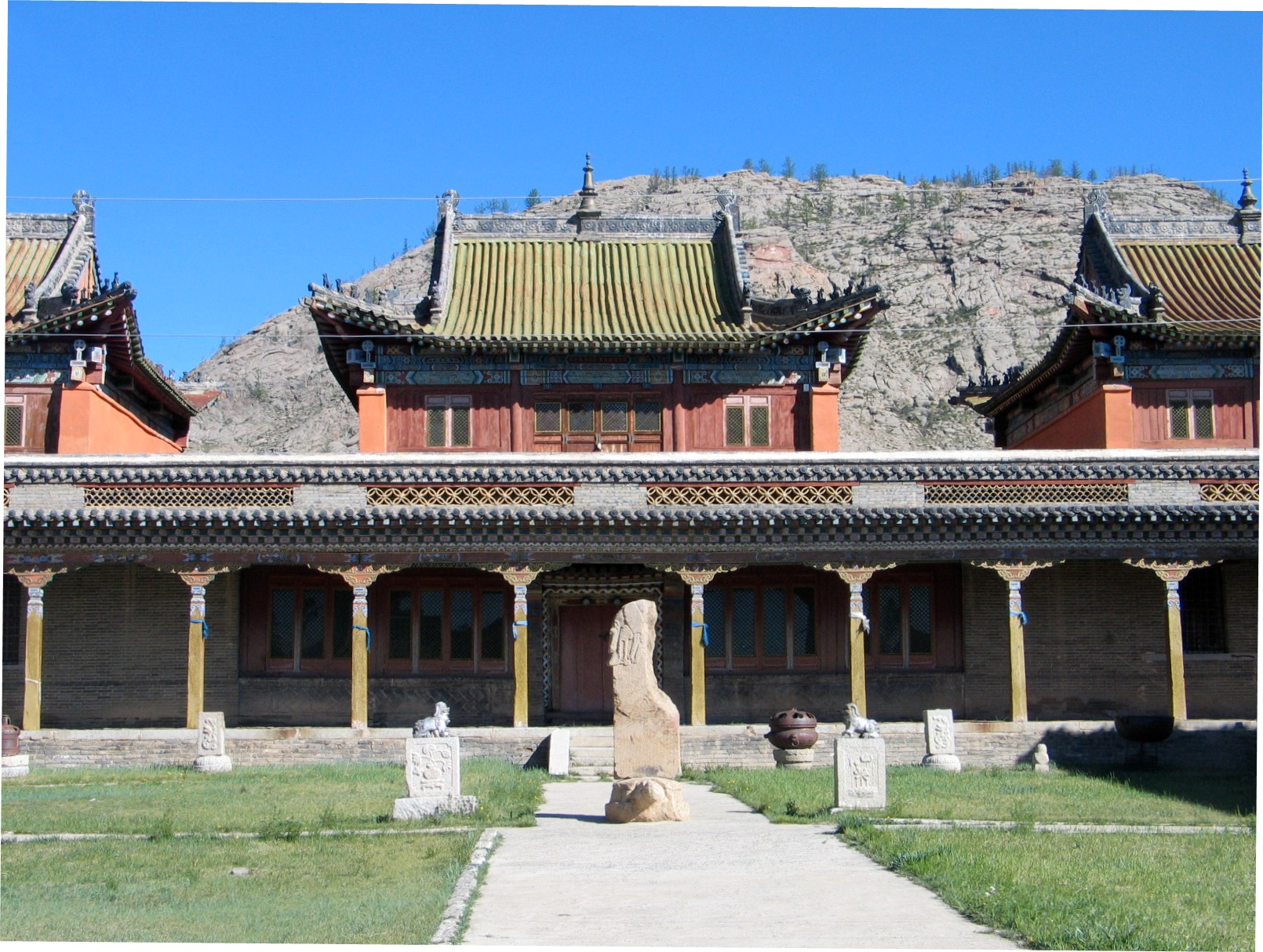
Zayiin Gegeen Monastery in Tsetserleg

Genghis Khan (c. 1162 – 1227) and his immediate successors conquered nearly all of Asia and European Russia and sent armies as far as central Europe and Southeast Asia. The emperors of the Yuan dynasty (1271–1368) in the 13th and 14th century converted to Tibetan Buddhism.

The founder of the Yuan dynasty, Kublai Khan, invited lama Drogön Chögyal Phagpa of the Sakya school of Tibetan Buddhism to spread Buddhism throughout his realm (the second introduction of Buddhism among the Mongols). Around this time, influence from the Church of the East was noted to be a major cultural factor for Mongols that indirectly spread and altered Mongolian Buddhism, and therefore Chinese Buddhism. However, Church of the East Christianity was a minority religion among Mongols.

Some Mongolian Buddhist institutions borrowed large amounts of doctrine from Nestorian Christians.

Other religions such as Manichaeism, Islam, Zoroastrianism and even Roman Catholicism also influenced Mongolian Buddhism and contributed to the syncretic practices of the time.

Buddhism became the de facto state religion of the Yuan dynasty. In 1269, Kublai Khan commissioned Phagpa lama to design a new writing system to unify the writing systems of the multilingual empire. The 'Phags-pa script, also known as the "Square script", was based on the Tibetan script and written vertically from top was designed to write in Mongolian, Tibetan, Chinese, Uighur and Sanskrit languages and served as the official script of the empire.

Tibetan Buddhist monasticism had an important influence on the early development of Mongolian Buddhism. Buddhist monkhood played significant political roles in Central and Southeast Asia, and the sangha in Mongolia was no exception.

The activities of the Mongols were conducive to the prominence of the Sakya school and then the Gelug, and to the further development of Tibeto-Mongolian culture.

=== Northern Yuan dynasty and cultural renaissance (16th century) – third introduction ===
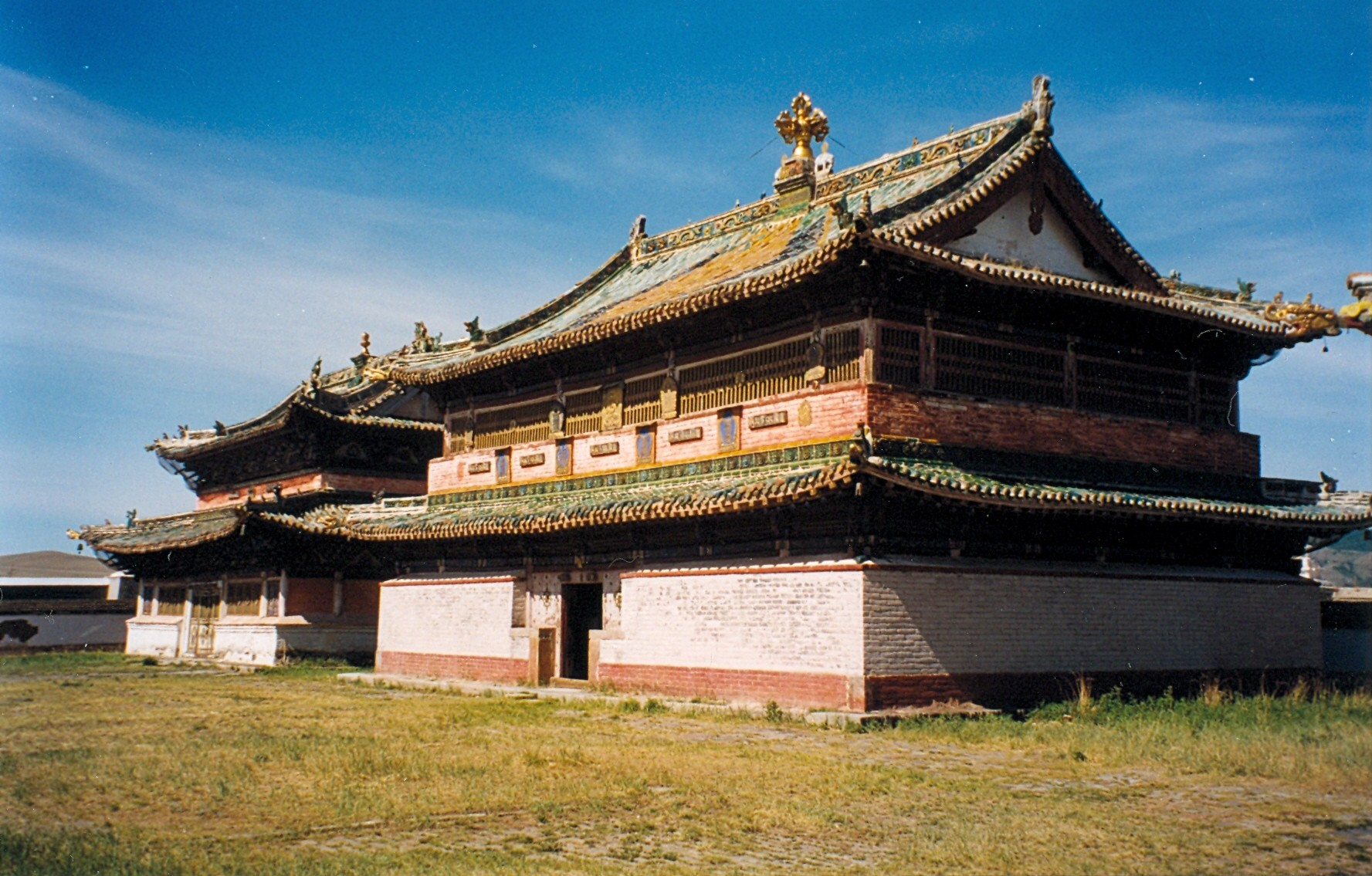
Temple at Erdene Zuu monastery established by Abtai Sain Khan in the Khalkha heartland during the 16th century.

The Mongols returned to shamanic traditions after the collapse of the Yuan dynasty in 1368.

Hutuhtai Secen Hongtaiji of Ordos and his two brothers invaded Tibet in 1566. He sent an ultimatum to some of the ruling clergy of Tibet demanding their submission. The Tibetan supreme monks decided to surrender and Hutuhtai Secen Hongtaiji returned to Ordos with three high ranking monks. Tumen Jasaghtu Khan invited a monk of the Kagyu school in 1576.

In 1578 Altan Khan, a Mongol military leader with ambitions to unite the Mongols and to emulate the career of Genghis Khan, invited the 3rd Dalai Lama, the head of the rising Gelug lineage to a summit. They formed an alliance that gave Altan Khan legitimacy and religious sanction for his imperial pretensions and that provided the Buddhist school with protection and patronage. Altan Khan recognized Sonam Gyatso lama as a reincarnation of Phagpa lama, gave the Tibetan leader the title of Dalai Lama ("Ocean Lama"), which his successors still hold. Sonam Gyatso, in turn, recognized Altan as a reincarnation of Kublai Khan. Thus, Altan added legitimacy to the title "khan" that he had assumed, while Sonam Gyatso received support for the supremacy he sought over the Tibetan sangha. Since this meeting, the heads of the Gelugpa school became known as Dalai Lamas. Altan Khan also bestowed the title Ochirdara (Очирдар, from Sanskr. Vajradhara) to Sonam Gyatso.

Altan Khan died soon after, but in the next century the Gelug spread throughout Mongolia, aided in part by the efforts of contending Mongol aristocrats to win religious sanction and mass support for their ultimately unsuccessful efforts to unite all Mongols in a single state. Viharas (Mongolian datsan) were built across Mongolia, often sited at the juncture of trade and migration routes or at summer pastures where large numbers of herders would congregate for shamanistic rituals and sacrifices. Buddhist monks carried out a protracted struggle with the indigenous shamans and succeeded, to some extent, in taking over their functions and fees as healers and diviners, and in pushing the shamans to the fringes of Mongolian culture and religion.

Church and state supported each other. Reincarnations of living Buddhas were often discovered in the families of Mongolian nobility until this practice was outlawed by the Qianlong Emperor of the Qing dynasty.

=== Qing dynasty (1636–1912) ===
During the Qing's founding emperor Hong Taiji's (1592–1643) campaign against the last Northern Yuan ruler Ligdan Khan, he started the sponsorship of Tibetan Buddhism to gain support. According to the Manchu historian Jin Qicong, Buddhism was used by Qing rulers to control Mongolians and Tibetans; it was of little relevance to ordinary Manchus in the Qing dynasty.

The long association of the Manchu rulership with the Bodhisattva Manjusri, and his own interest in Tibetan Buddhism, gave credence to the Qianlong Emperor's patronage of Tibetan Buddhist art, and patronage of translations of the Buddhist canon. He supported the Yellow Church (the Tibetan Buddhist Gelukpa sect) to "maintain peace among the Mongols" since the Mongols were followers of the Dalai Lama and Panchen Lama of the Yellow Church. Mark Elliott concludes that these actions delivered political benefits but "meshed seamlessly with his personal faith."

The Khalkha nobles' power was deliberately undermined by Qianlong, when he appointed the Tibetan Ishi-damba-nima of the Lithang royal family of the eastern Tibetans as the 3rd reincarnated Jebtsundamba, instead of the Khalkha Mongol which they wanted to be appointed. The decision was first protested against by the Outer Mongol Khalkha nobles, and then the Khalkhas sought to have him placed at a distance from them at Dolonnor. Nevertheless, Qianlong snubbed both of their requests, sending the message that he was putting an end to Outer Mongolian autonomy. The decision to make Tibet the only place where the reincarnation came from was intentional by the Qing to curtail the Mongols.

=== Bogd Khanate (early 20th century) ===
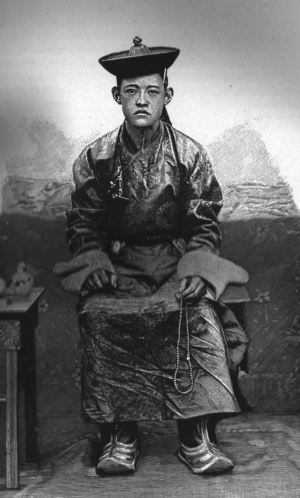
The Bogd Khan was simultaneously the religious and secular head of state until his death in 1924.

By the beginning of the twentieth century, Outer Mongolia had 583 monasteries and temple complexes, which controlled an estimated 20 percent of the country's wealth. Almost all Mongolian cities have grown up on the sites of monasteries. Ikh Huree, as Ulaanbaatar was then known, was the seat of the preeminent living Buddha of Mongolia (the 8th Jebtsundamba Khutuktu, also known as the Bogdo Gegen and later as the Bogd Khan), who ranked third in the ecclesiastical hierarchy after the Dalai Lama and the Panchen Lama. Two monasteries there contained approximately 13,000 and 7000 monks, respectively, and the pre-revolutionary name of the settlement known to outsiders as Urga, Ikh Huree, means "Big Monastery".

Over the centuries, the monasteries acquired riches and secular dependents, gradually increasing their wealth and power as the wealth and power of the Mongol nobility declined. Some nobles donated a portion of their dependent families—people, rather than land, were the foundation of wealth and power in old Mongolia—to the monasteries. Some herders dedicated themselves and their families to serve the monasteries, either from piety or from the desire to escape the arbitrary exactions of the nobility. In some areas, the monasteries and their living buddhas (of whom there were a total of 140 in 1924) were also the secular authorities. In the 1920s, there were about 110,000 monks, including children, who made up about one-third of the male population, although many of these lived outside the monasteries and did not observe their vows. About 250,000 people, more than a third of the total population, either lived in territories administered by monasteries and living Buddhas or were hereditary dependents of the monasteries.

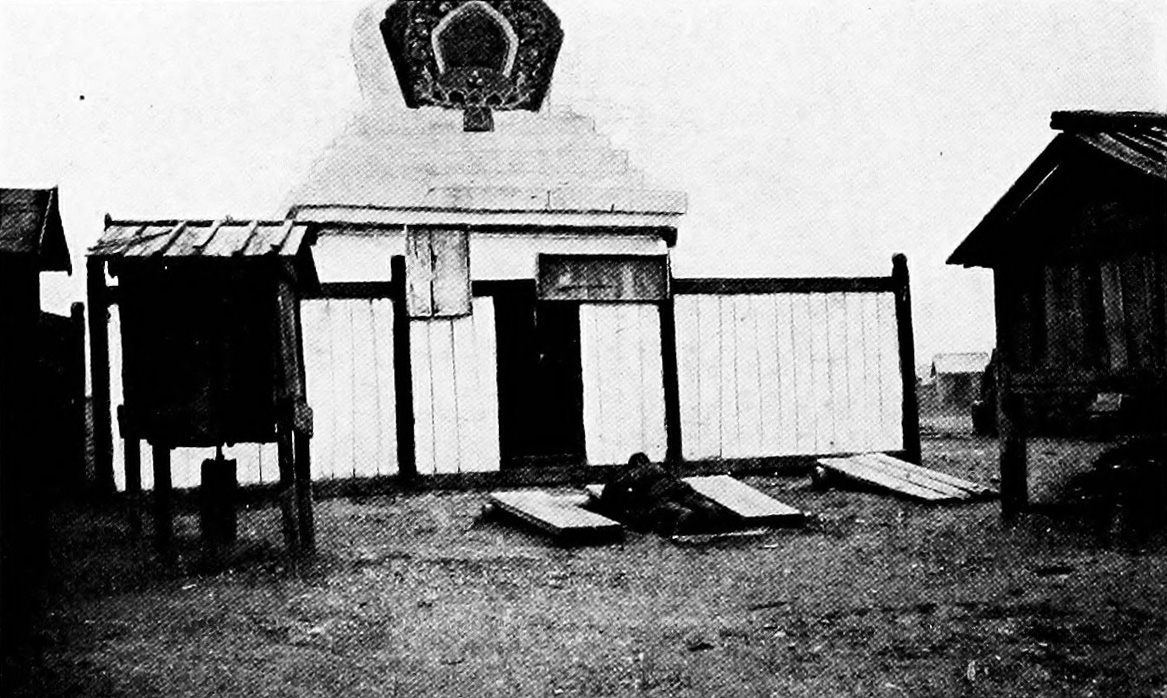
Mongol praying at a shrine in Urga

With the end of Manchu rule in 1911, the Buddhist church and its clergy provided the only political structure available. The autonomous state thus took the form of a weakly centralized theocracy, headed by the Jebtsundamba Khutukhtu in Ikh Khuree, the capital city.

By the twentieth century, Buddhism had penetrated deeply into the culture of Mongolia, and the populace willingly supported the lamas and the monasteries. Foreign observers usually had a negative opinion of Mongolian monks, condemning them as lazy, ignorant, corrupt, and debauched, but the Mongolian people did not concur. Ordinary Mongolians apparently combined a cynical and realistic anticlericalism, sensitive to the faults and the human fallibility of individual monks or groups of monks, with a deep and unwavering concern for the transcendent values of the church.

=== Mongolian People's Republic (1924–1992) ===
When communist revolutionaries took power in July 1921, a people's government was established with the 8th Jebtsundamba Khutukhtu as a limited monarch. The Bogd Khan later passed away on 20 May 1924. Following his death, the Mongolian People's Republic (MPR) was officially established soon that year with political power held by the Mongolian People's Revolutionary Party (MPRP). Determined to modernize and reform Mongolian society, the revolutionaries confronted a massive ecclesiastical structure that enrolled a large part of the population, monopolized education and medical services, administered justice in a part of the country, and controlled a great deal of the national wealth.

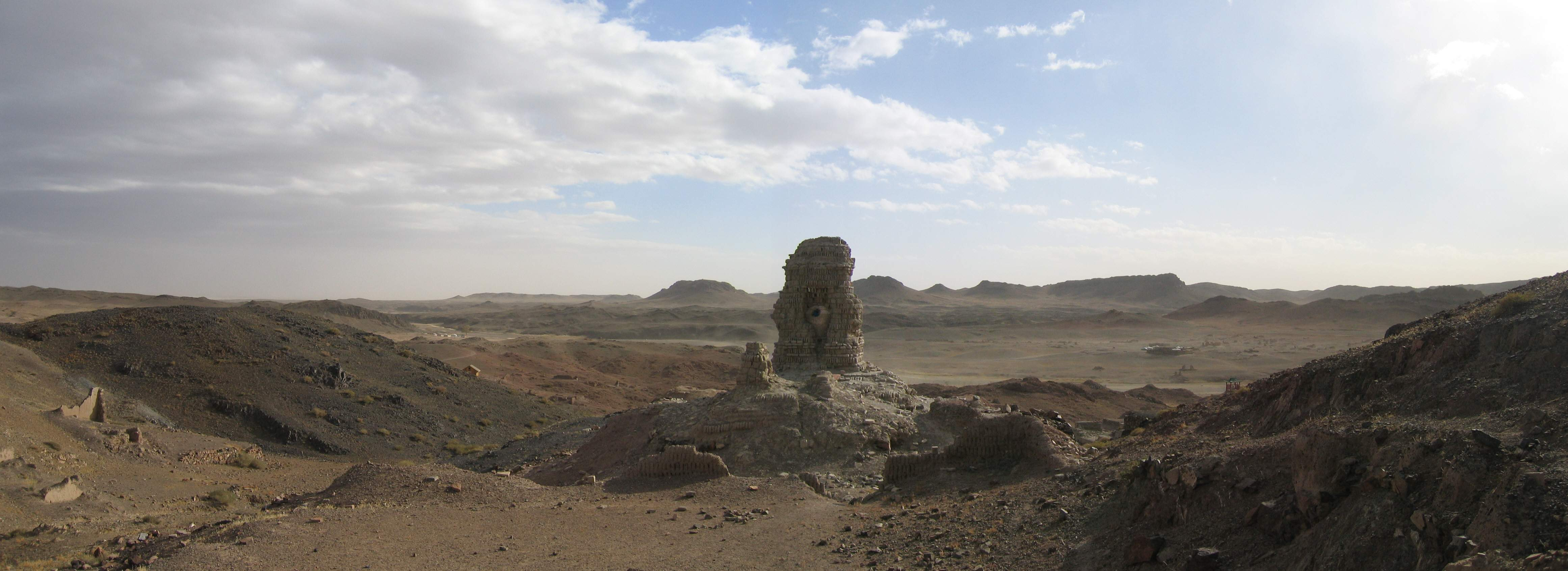
Ruins of the Ongiin Monastery, Saikhan-Ovoo, Dundgovi

The Buddhist church, moreover, had no interest in reforming itself or in modernizing the country. The result was a protracted political struggle that absorbed the energies and attention of the party and its Soviet advisers for nearly twenty years. As late as 1934, the party counted 843 major Buddhist centers, about 3,000 temples of various sizes, and nearly 6000 associated buildings, which usually were the only fixed structures in a world of yurts. The annual income of the church was 31 million tögrögs, while that of the state was 37.5 million tögrögs. A party source claimed that, in 1935, monks constituted 48 percent of the adult male population.

With a politically reliable and secularly educated administrators, waves of Soviet-inspired anti-religious campaigns, collectivization efforts, nationalization and confiscation of estates were implemented during the leftist period of 1928 and 1932. In 1929, the same year Soviet leader Joseph Stalin began his anti-religious campaign, the MPRP condemned Buddhist reconciliation and forbid the installation of the 9th Jebtsundamba Khutukhtu. The Buddhist church was removed progressively from public administration, was subjected to confiscatory taxes, was forbidden to teach children, and was prohibited from recruiting new monks or replacing living Buddhas.

The new policies were met with low popular support by the general public, who were largely illiterate, nomadic, and remained obedient to traditional authorities. Despite the opposition, the policies were accelerated following the 8th Party Congress in 1930. Under the direction of Khorloogiin Choibalsan, waves of repression came in 1929, 1931, and 1932, where hundreds of feudal and clergy estates were confiscated. In reaction to the radical policies, an armed uprising was led by the Buddhist monks in Western Mongolia in April 1932. The some leaders of the revolt, also locally known as "The Shambhala War" (Шамбалын дайн), sought military assistance from the 9th Panchen Lama, the second-highest Buddhist authority who was locked in Lhasa. In October 1932, the uprising was fully crushed by the Mongolian People's Revolutionary Army with Soviet assistance. After the uprising, with direction from the Comintern and CPSU, the party rejected what it described "leftist deviation" and carried out the removal of top leftist leaders and reversal of collectivization along with continued persecution of Buddhism.

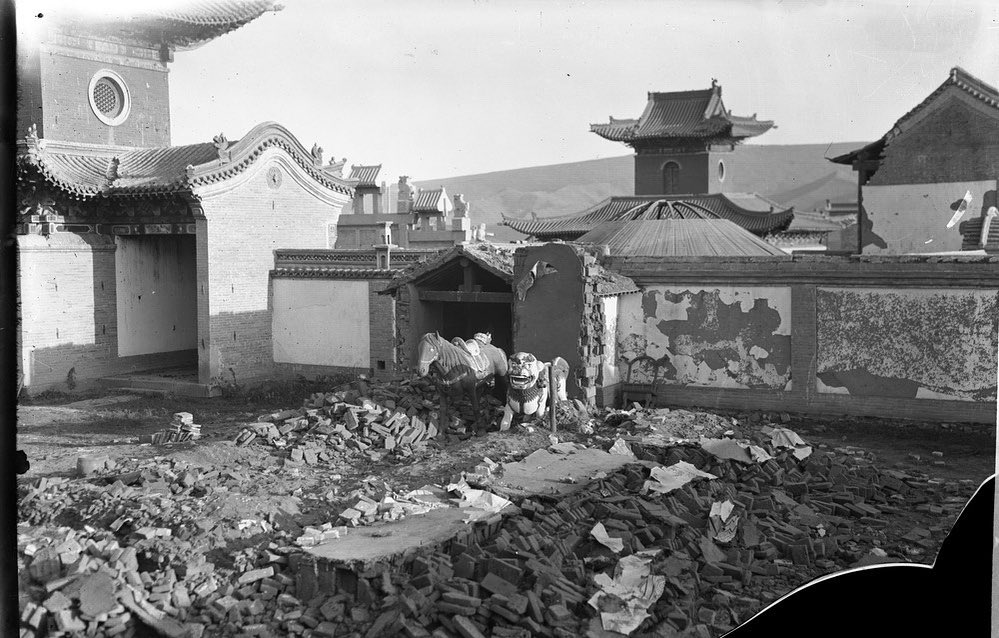
Choijin Lama Temple during the height of the repressions against Buddhism in 1937.

Persecution of Buddhism reached its peak during the Great Repression, when then-minister of interior Khorloogiin Choibalsan orchestrated the purge of his political opponents, religious and minority populations between 1937 and 1939. In 1938—amid accusations that the church and monasteries were trying to cooperate with the Japanese, who were promoting a pan-Mongol puppet state—remaining monasteries were dissolved with their property seized and their monks secularized, interned or executed. Monastic buildings that had not been destroyed were taken over to serve as local government offices or schools. Its estimated that between 20,000 and 35,000 "enemies of the revolution" were executed, a figure representing three to five percent of Mongolia's population at the time. Robert Rupen reports that in the 1920s there were over 112,000 Mongolian Buddhist monks, representing more than 13% of Mongolia's overall population. By the 1940s, nearly every monk was either dead or had apostatized.

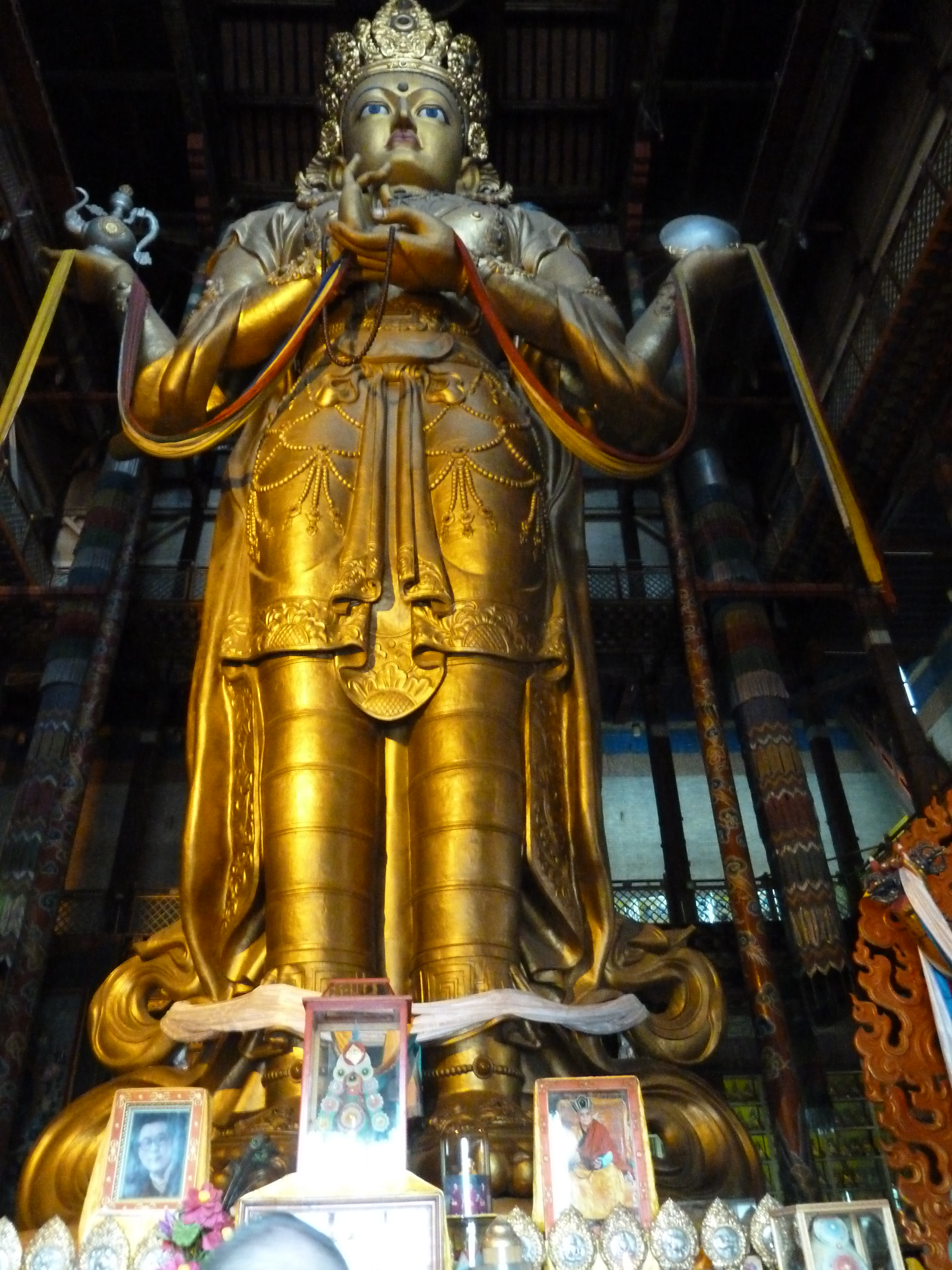
Mongolian statue of Avalokiteśvara (Mongolian name: Migjid Janraisig), Gandantegchinlen Monastery. World tallest indoor statue, 26.5-meter-high, 1996 rebuilt, (first built in 1913, destroyed in 1937)

Since the late 1940s, one monastery, Gandan Monastery, with a community of 100 monks, was open in Ulaanbaatar. It was the country's sole monastery and was more for international display than functionality. A few of the old monasteries survived as museums, and the Gandan Monastery served as a living museum and a tourist attraction. Its monks included a few young men who had undergone a five-year training period, but whose motives and mode of selection were unknown to Western observers. The party apparently thought that Buddhism no longer posed a challenge to its dominance and that—because Buddhism had played so large a part in the history of Mongolia and traditional arts and culture, total extirpation of knowledge about the religion and its practices would cut modern Mongols off from much of their past to the detriment of their national identity. A few aged former monks were employed to translate Tibetan-language handbooks on herbs and traditional Tibetan medicine. Government spokesmen described the monks of the Gandan Monastery as doing useful work. Today the monastery has been reinvigorated as Gandantegchinlen Monastery by the post-ёommunist governments of the country.

Buddhism, furthermore played a role in Mongolia's foreign policy by linking Mongolia with the communist and the non-communist states of East and Southeast Asia. Ulaanbaatar was the headquarters of the Asian Buddhist Conference for Peace, which has held conferences for Buddhists from such countries as Japan, Vietnam, Cambodia, Sri Lanka, and Bhutan; published a journal for international circulation; and maintained contacts with such groups as the Christian Peace Conference, the Soviet Afro-Asian Solidarity Committee and the Russian Orthodox Church. It sponsored the visits of the 14th Dalai Lama to Mongolia in 1979 and 1982. The organization, headed by the abbot of then-Gandan Monastery, advanced the foreign policy goals of the Mongolian government, which were in accord with those of the Soviet Union.

=== Modern Mongolia (since 1992) ===
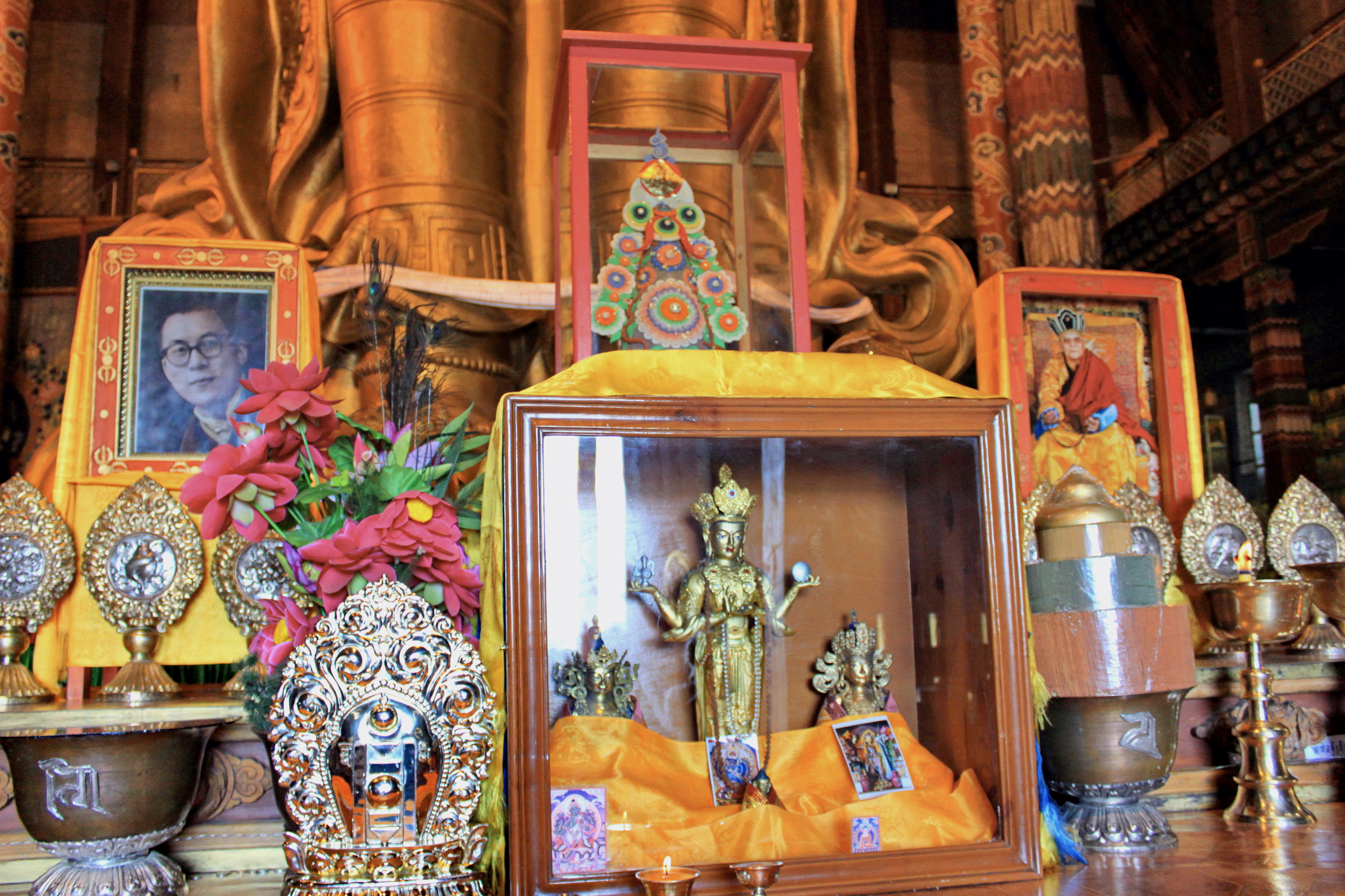
Altar of the 14th Dalai Lama (right) and 9th Jebtsundamba Khutughtu (left) at the Gandantegchinlen Monastery, 2010

After the 1990 overthrow of communism, there has been a resurgence of Buddhism in the country, with about 200 temples now in existence and a monastic sangha of around 300 to 500 Mongolian monks and nuns. According to Vesna Wallace, a professor of religious studies at UC Santa Barbara: "Now more people are coming to temples and visiting monasteries. There is also a new interest in meditation among the general public."

In 1990, the 14th Dalai Lama revealed the identity of the 9th Jebtsundamba Khutughtu, who was identified in 1936 at the age of three in Lhasa and kept secret due to communist persecution. In 1991 and 1992, the Dalai Lama ceremonially installed and enthroned him in India. The 9th Jebtsundamba Khutughtu was enthroned at the Gandantegchinlen Monastery, Ulaanbaatar in July 1999. He died on 1 March 2012.

The 14th Dalai Lama made a total of nine visits to Mongolia since his first visit in 1979. During which, he identified about 40 saints and incarnations. In his last and most recent visit to Mongolia in November 2016, when he stated that the 10th Jebtsundamba Khutughtu had just been (re)born in Mongolia. The week after the Dalai Lama's visit, the People's Republic of China imposed tariffs on Mongolia and closed a key border crossing, causing major traffic jams and stranding truck drivers in sub-zero temperatures for days. China also broke off negotiations with Mongolia for a $4.2 billion loan. The 10th Jebtsundamba Khutughtu was presented to the public as A.Altannar in 2023.

According to the national census of 2010, 53% of the Mongolians identify as Buddhists, the largest religious group in the country. Of the remaining demographics, 38.6% identified as non-religious. The amount of Buddhist Mongolians rose from 1.4 million to 1.7 million according to the 2020 national census, although its percentage decreased to 51.6%.

== List of Mongolian Khutukhtus ==
- Bogda Jebtsundamba Khutukhtu (Богд Жавзандамба хутагт)
- Bambar Erdeni Hubilgan (Бамбар Эрдэнэ хувилгаан)
- Blama-yin Gegegen (Ламын гэгээн)
- Brahmein Gegegen (Брахмайн Гэгээн)
- Ching Sujigtu Nomun Khan Khutukhtu (Чин Сүжигт Номун Хан хутагт)
- Dilova Khutukhtu (Дилав хутагт)
- Doghshin Noyan Khutukhtu (Догшин ноён хутагт)
- Heuhen Khutukhtu (Хүүхэн хутагт)
- Ilghaghsan Khutukhtu (Ялгасан хутагт)
- Ilaghughsan Khutukhtu (Ялгуусан хутагт)
- Jalkhantsa Khutukhtu (Жалханз хутагт)
- Khamba Nomun Khan Khutukhtu (Хамба Номун Хан хутагт)
- Mantsusri Khutukhtu (Манзушри хутагт)
- Naro Panchen Khutukhtu (Нар Ванчин хутагт)
- Shavron Khutukhtu (Шаврон хутагт) the last reincarnation Gombosuren born in 1925 is living
- Yogachara Khutukhtu (Егүзэр хутагт)
- Zaya Pandita Khutukhtu (Зая Бандида хутагт)
- Kanjurwa Khutukhtu (Ганжуурва хутагт)
- Jasrai Gegegen (Жасрай гэгээн)
- Vajradhara Hubilgan (Очирдар хувилгаан)
- Bari Yonjan Damtsag Dorje (Бари Ёнзин Дамцагдорж)

=== Khutukhtus from other Mongolian regions ===
- Aria Gegeen (Ажиа гэгээн), Qinghai, Upper Mongolia
- Gurudiva Rinpoche (Гүрүдива Ринбүчи), Ordos City, Inner Mongolia

== Gallery ==
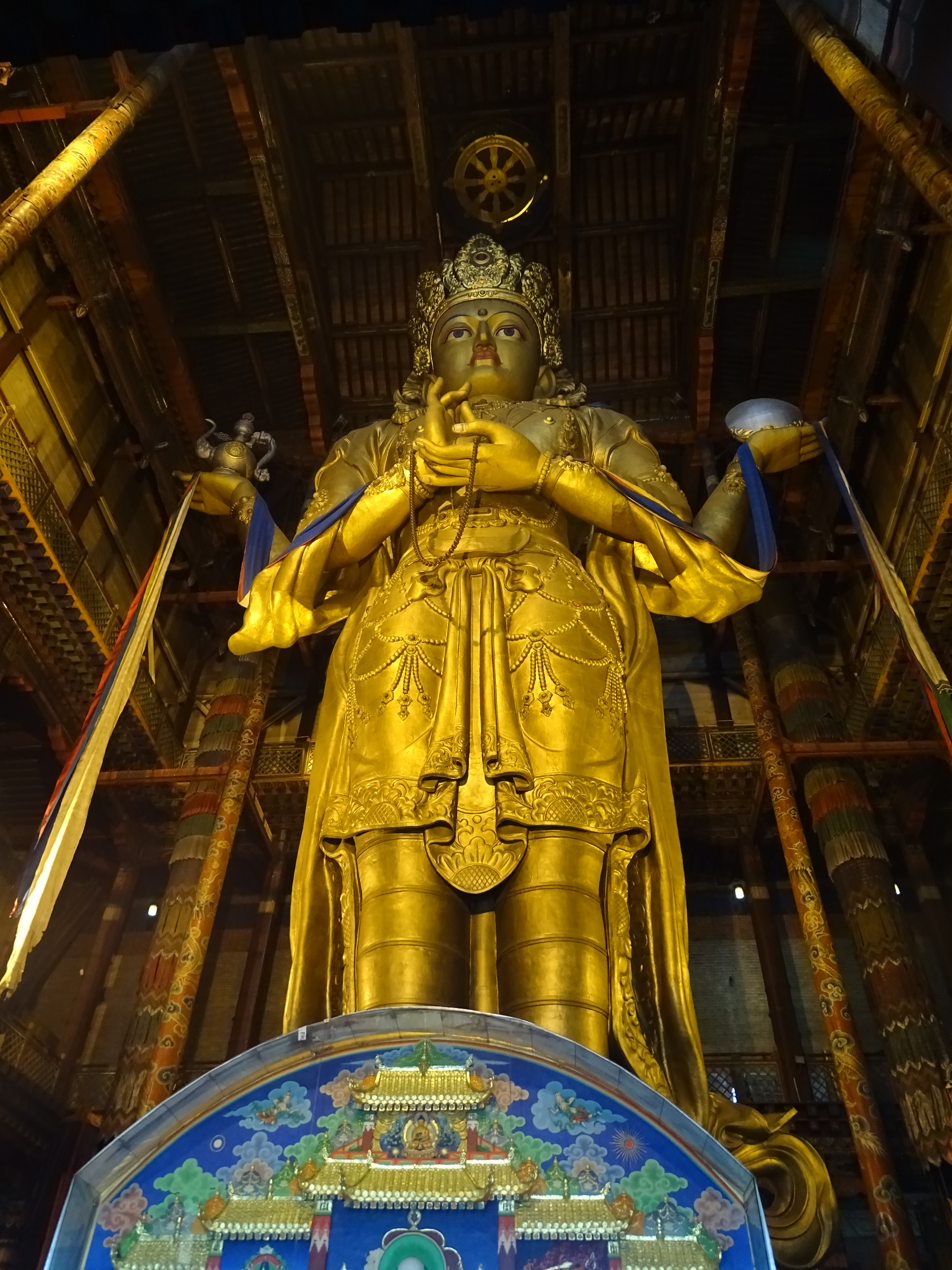
Statue of Migjid Janraisig, Gandantegchinlen Monastery

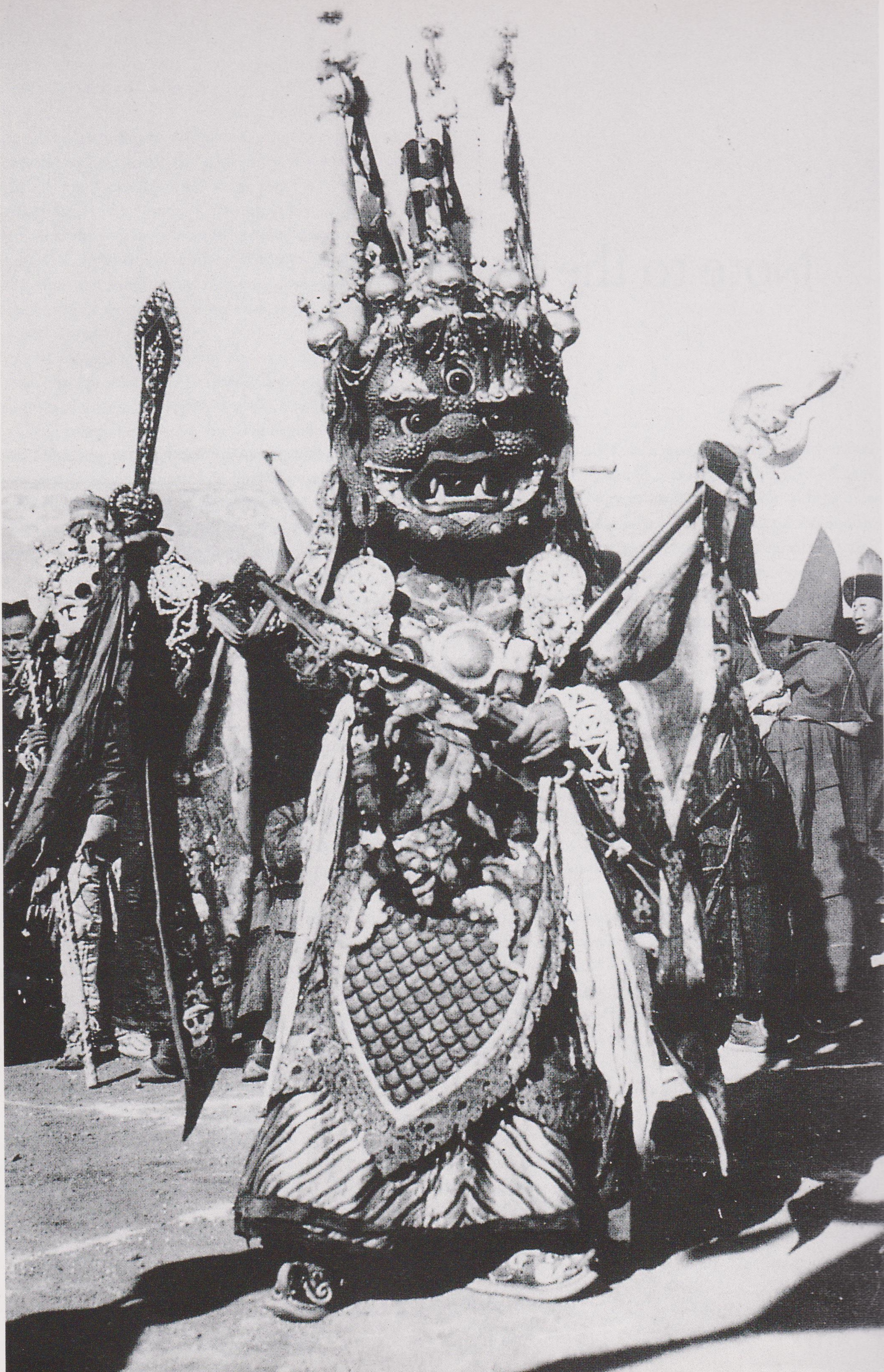
The main Mongolian deity, Begtse, in a tsam dance, circa 1930

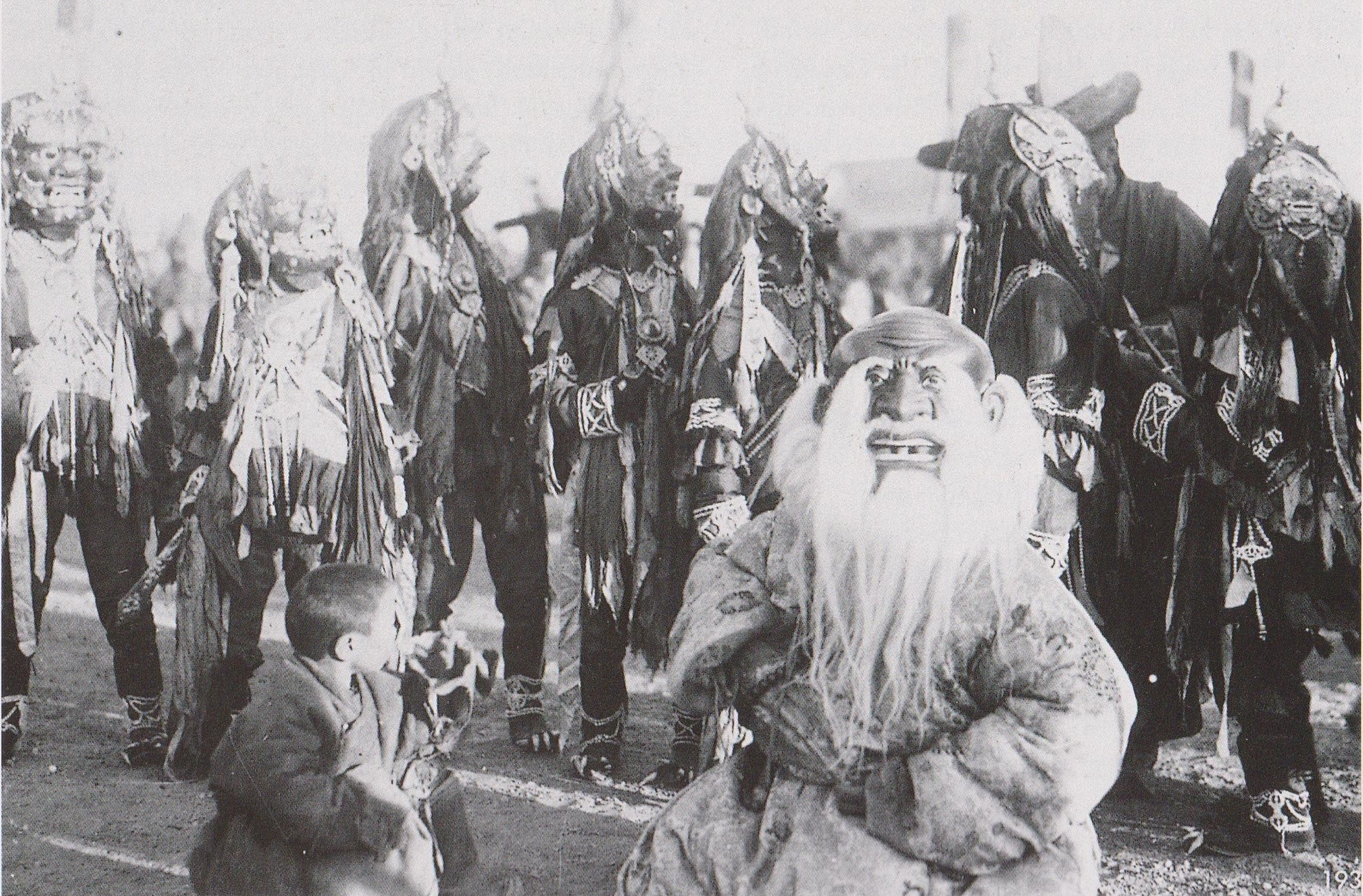
The last Ikh Khüree tsam dance festival in 1937, before organised Buddhism was wiped out. Mongolian deity of the Sagaan Ubgen (pictured), the most comic character in tsam.

Traditional lama attires displayed at the National Museum of Mongolia

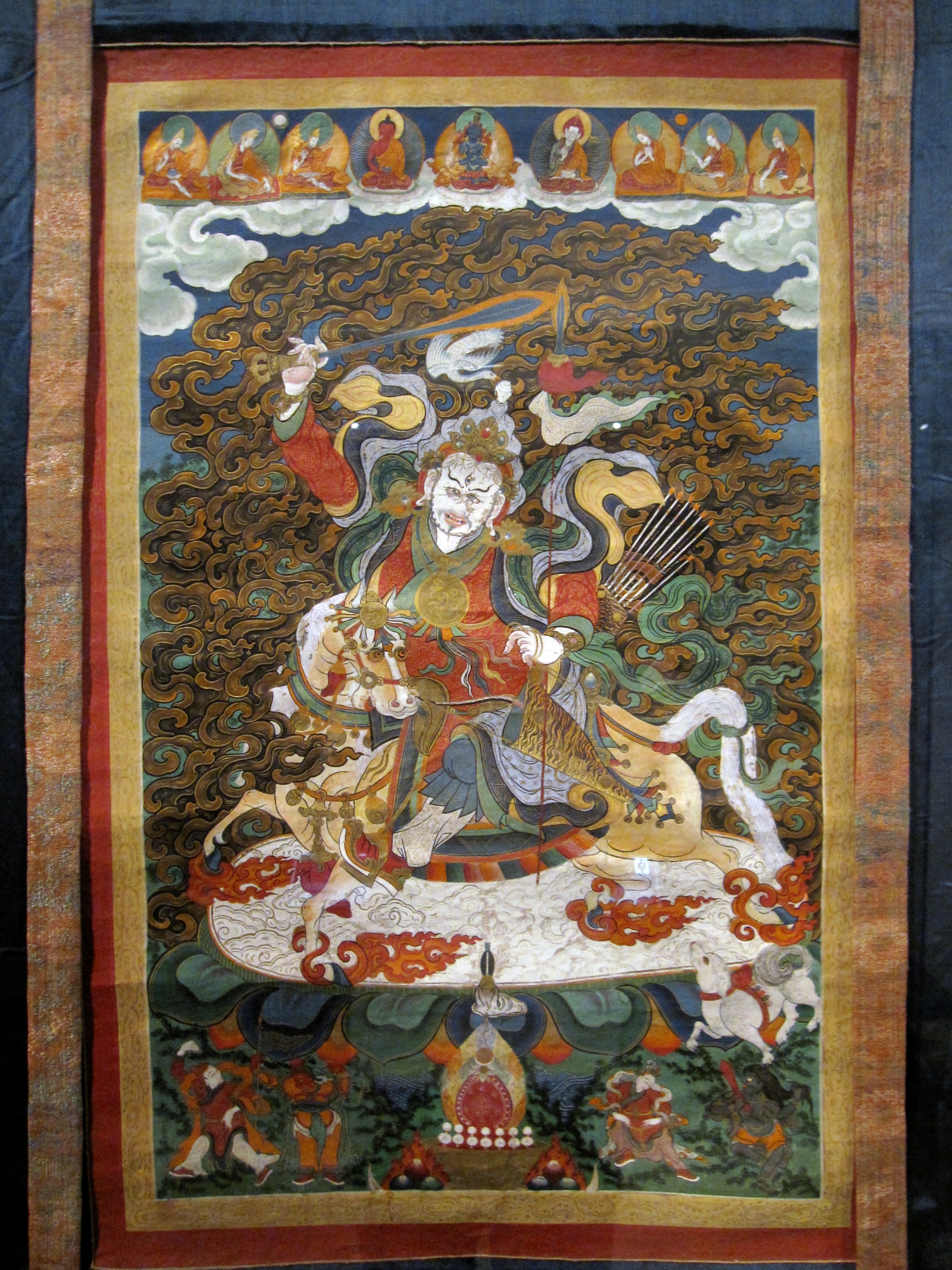
Thangka showing a mountain deity carrying a sword

== See also ==
- Balhae
- Black shamanism
- Buddhism in Buryatia
- Buddhism in China
- Buddhism in India
- Buddhism in Russia
- Buddhism in Tibet
- Buddhism in Tuva
- Buddha Mountain (Mongolia)
- Buryatia
- History of Tuva
- Mongolian shamanism
- Red Hat sect
- Stalinist repressions in Mongolia
- Tengrism and Buddhism
- Tuva
- Yellow shamanism
- Zabaykalsky Krai
