= DGa'-ldan =

dGa'-ldan may refer to

- Ganden Monastery near Lhasa, Tibet
- Gandantegchinlen Monastery, Ulaanbaatar, Mongolia
- Galdan Boshugtu Khan, a Dsungar ruler of the 17th century.
