= Munkhnasan Narmandakh =

Mongolian businesswoman (born 1981)

- Born: Ulaanbaatar, Mongolia
- Occupation: Businesswoman
- Spouse: Altannar Chinchuluun
- Children: 4

Munkhnasan Narmandakh (Mongolian: Нармандахын Мөнхнасан) is a Mongolian businesswoman. She is the current chairwoman and former CEO of Monpolymet Group.

== Early life ==
Munkhnasan was born and raised in Ulaanbaatar, Mongolia. She is the daughter of Garamjav Tseden.

Munkhnasan studied in the United States as an exchange student and graduated from George Washington University in Washington, DC, and the University of San Francisco in California, where she earned degrees in Finance and Economics.

== Career ==
Previously, Munkhnasan has worked at the World Bank in Washington DC and the Central Bank of Mongolia with analytical and development economics experience. She then joined Monpolymet Group to develop MonCement Project, which became Mongolia’s first technologically advanced and environmentally friendly cement plant that set new quality standards for Mongolian construction sector. MonCement project was recognized as EBRD’s “the first project of Mongolia with Gender and Social action plans” in 2016 and “Environment & Social Best Practice – Sustainability award” in 2017.

Munkhnasan has been selected as one of the leading entrepreneurs for Forbes 30 under 30 list and also as the first female entrepreneur representing Mongolia at EY Entrepreneurial Winning Women Asia-Pacific.

Monpolymet Group operates in various business sectors in heavy industry of Mongolia including natural rehabilitation, construction and production of building materials with over thousand employees and has been recognized nationally for leading the industry’s standards for environmental restoration, biological rehabilitation results and won the “Best Rehabilitating Company of the Year” award 23 years in a row.

== Personal life ==
Munkhnasan is married to Altannar Chinchuluun, a mathematics professor at the National University of Mongolia. She has four children, two of whom are identical twin boys, Achildai Altannar and Agudai Altannar, who were born in Washington, D.C. One of the twins is the 10th Jebtsundamba Khutughtu.
