= 9th Jebtsundamba Khutughtu =

Gelug Tibetan Buddhist leader (1933–2012)

9th Jebtsundamba Khutughtu, Jampal Namdröl Chökyi Gyaltsen

Personal life
- Born: 6 January 1933 Lhasa, Tibet
- Died: 1 March 2012 (aged 79) Ulaanbaatar, Mongolia

Religious life
- Religion: Tibetan Buddhism

Senior posting
- Period in office: 1936–2012
- Predecessor: 8th Jebtsundamba Khutughtu, Agwaanl Uwsanchoizhiniam Danzan Wanchüg
- Successor: 10th Jebtsundamba Khutughtu, A. Altannar

Chinese name
- Chinese: 蔣巴南卓·確吉堅贊
Transcriptions
Standard Mandarin
- Hanyu Pinyin: Jiǎngbānánzhuó Quèjíjiānzàn

Tibetan name
- Tibetan: འཇམ་དཔལ་རྣམ་གྲོལ་ཆོས་ཀྱི་རྒྱལ་མཚན་
Transcriptions
- Wylie: 'jam dpal rnam grol chos kyi rgyal mtshan
- Tibetan Pinyin: Jambä Namchö Qögyi Gyäcän

Mongolian name
- Mongolian Cyrillic: Жамбалнамдолчойжижалцан

The 9th Jebtsundamba Khutughtu (né Jampal Namdol Chökyi Gyaltsen (Note: Tibetan: འཇམ་དཔལ་རྣམ་གྲོལ་ཆོས་ཀྱི་རྒྱལ་མཚན་, Wylie: 'jam dpal rnam grol chos kyi rgyal mtshan, ZWPY: Jambä Namchö Qögyi Gyäcän; Mongolian: Жамбалнамдолчойжижалцан; Chinese: 蔣巴南卓·確吉堅贊; pinyin: Jiǎngbānánzhuó Quèjíjiānzàn) 6 January 1933 – 1 March 2012) was the 9th reincarnation of the Jebtsundamba Khutuktu, the third highest lama in the Tibetan Buddhism hierarchy and the spiritual leader of the Gelug lineage among the Khalkha Mongols. Although recognized as the reincarnation of the Bogd Khan in 1936, his identity was kept a secret by the Dalai Lama until 1990, due to the persecution of the Buddhist religion by the Communist Mongolian People's Republic, and he did not reside in Mongolia until the final year of his life.

== Biography ==
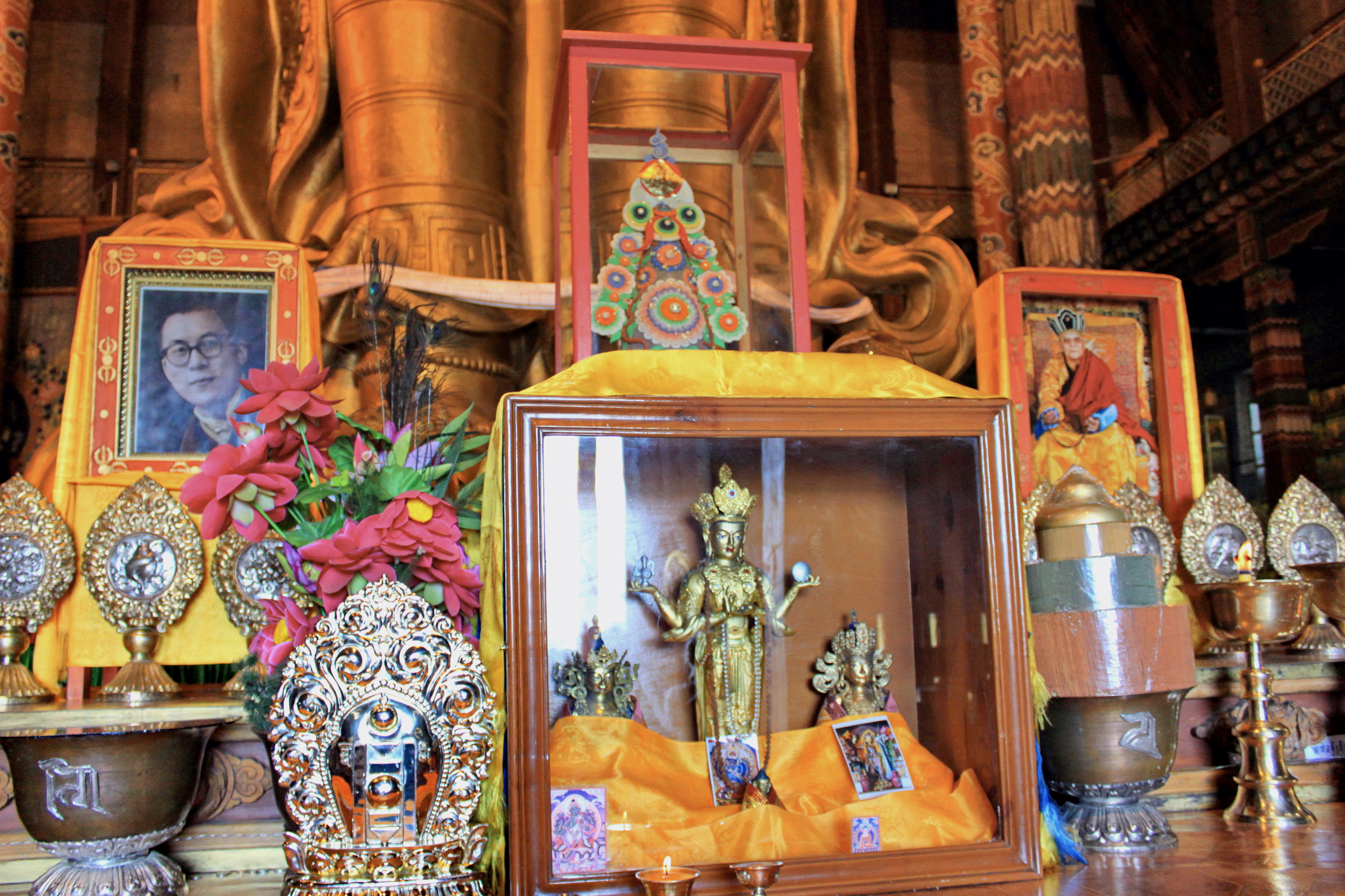
Altar of the 9th Jebtsundamba Khutughtu with a photo of the 14th Dalai Lama. Gandantegchinlen Monastery, Ulaanbaatar, Mongolia

He was born as Jampal Namdol Chökyi Gyaltsen on the tenth day of the eleventh month of the Water Monkey year (6 January 1933) near the Jokhang Temple in Lhasa, Tibet. Six months after his birth, his parents separated and his mother left him in the care of his uncle who was a bodyguard of the 13th Dalai Lama. The Dalai Lama died in December 1933, and Reting Rinpoche became Regent of Tibet until a new Dalai Lama was discovered and crowned. In 1936, because of the inability of the Mongolian lamas to proclaim the discovery of the ninth Khutughtu, Reting Rinpoche recognised Jampal Namdol Chökyi Gyaltsen, then aged four, as the reincarnation of the Jetsundamba Khutughtu, after the boy passed three sets of tests. Due to the complex political situation, his existence was kept a secret. At the age of seven, he entered the Drepung Monastery, but because his identity was kept secret, he could not enter the Khalkha Mitsen, but had to follow the life of a common monk. At age 25, he renounced his monastic vows and became a householder, took a wife and had two children. When the 14th Dalai Lama escaped from Tibet in 1959, Jampal Namdol did also, fearing that his identity would be revealed and he would be killed or used by the Communists for propaganda.

In exile in India, he worked at various jobs, including in the Tibetan language section of All India Radio, and at Tibet House in New Delhi. His first wife died, and he remarried. In 1975, his family (now including seven children) moved to Karnataka. In 1984, Jampal Namdol visited Lhasa, and in 1990 the Dalai Lama issued a statement revealing the identity of the ninth Khutughtu. In 1991 the Dalai Lama performed an installation ceremony in Madhya Pradesh and in 1992 an enthronement ceremony in Dharmshala for the ninth Jebtsundamba Khutughtu. In July 1999, while visiting Mongolia on a tourist visa, Jampal Namdol took part in an enthronement ceremony at the Gandantegchinlen Khiid Monastery in Ulaanbaatar. He continued to live in exile in India. Now he was considered the leader of Mongolian Buddhists. In 2010 he came to Mongolia at the invitation of the Gandantegchinlin monastery and received Mongolian citizenship, but returned to Dharamshala afterwards. Then he returned to Mongolia. In November 2011 he was enthroned as the head of the Buddhists of Mongolia.

The 14th Dalai Lama appointed the 9th Jebtsundamba to develop the Jonang tradition of Tibetan Buddhism.

Rinpoche died on 1 March 2012, in Ulaanbaatar, Mongolia, after a prolonged illness.

On 23 November 2016, during a visit to Mongolia, the Dalai Lama announced his belief that the 10th Jebtsundamba Khutughtu had been reborn in Mongolia and that a process for identifying him had begun. He was found and was anointed on 8 March 2023 by the Dalai Lama in India.

== See also ==
- Mongolians in India
