= Garamjav Tseden =

Mongolian businesswoman and politician

- Цэдэнгийн Гарамжав

Member of State Great Khural
- In office July 2016 – June 2020

Personal details
- Born: Ulaanbaatar, Mongolia
- Party: Mongolian People's Party

Tsedengiin Garamjav (Mongolian: Цэдэнгийн Гарамжав), known internationally as Garamjav Tseden, is a Mongolian businesswoman and politician. She is the founder of the Monpolymet Group and was a member of the State Great Khural from 2016 to 2020.

== Biography ==
When the State Institute of Construction Design was dissolved in 1990, Tsedengiin Garamjav, together with a small group of fellow engineers, founded a private engineering cooperative that would later grow into the Monpolymet Group. Starting with fewer than ten professionals specializing in geology and mining engineering, the cooperative has since evolved into one of Mongolia's leading industrial groups, employing more than 1,000 people. The name Monpolymet, derived from "Mongolian Poly Metal," reflected the founders' vision of exploring, developing, and responsibly utilizing the nation's rich mineral resources.

Under Garamjav's leadership, Monpolymet became a pioneer in environmentally responsible mining and established a benchmark for mine rehabilitation in Mongolia. A professional engineer by training, she has long maintained that mineral extraction and environmental restoration are inseparable responsibilities. Guided by this philosophy, Monpolymet has planted and nurtured more than 400,000 trees, established seven forest parks, and has been recognized 23 times as Mongolia's Leading Mine Rehabilitation Organization.

Garamjav has also played a leading role in Mongolia's industrial development, overseeing the establishment of five major industrial facilities. Together with her team, she developed the Toson processing plant, which contributes to the country's mineral production; two environmentally friendly dredging plants utilizing modern technology; the Moncement plant, which helped revitalize Mongolia's cement and heavy manufacturing industries; and the Waste Heat Recovery (WHR) plant, which introduced world-class, energy-efficient, and environmentally sustainable technology to the country.

She was listed as one of the Leading Women in Business by EBRD in 2012 and Forbes's 50 Asia Power Businesswomen in 2015. In 2016, Garamjav was elected to the State Great Khural.

Garamjav Tseden received Mongolian State title of Hero of Labor for her tireless hard-work of over 40 years in the heavy industry sector.

Garamjav is the mother of Munkhnasan Narmandakh who serves as Chairwoman of the Monpolymet Group. Through her daughter, she is the grandmother of the 10th Jebtsundamba Khutughtu.
