= Gandantegchinlen Monastery =

Buddhist monastery in Bayangol, Ulaanbaatar, Mongolia

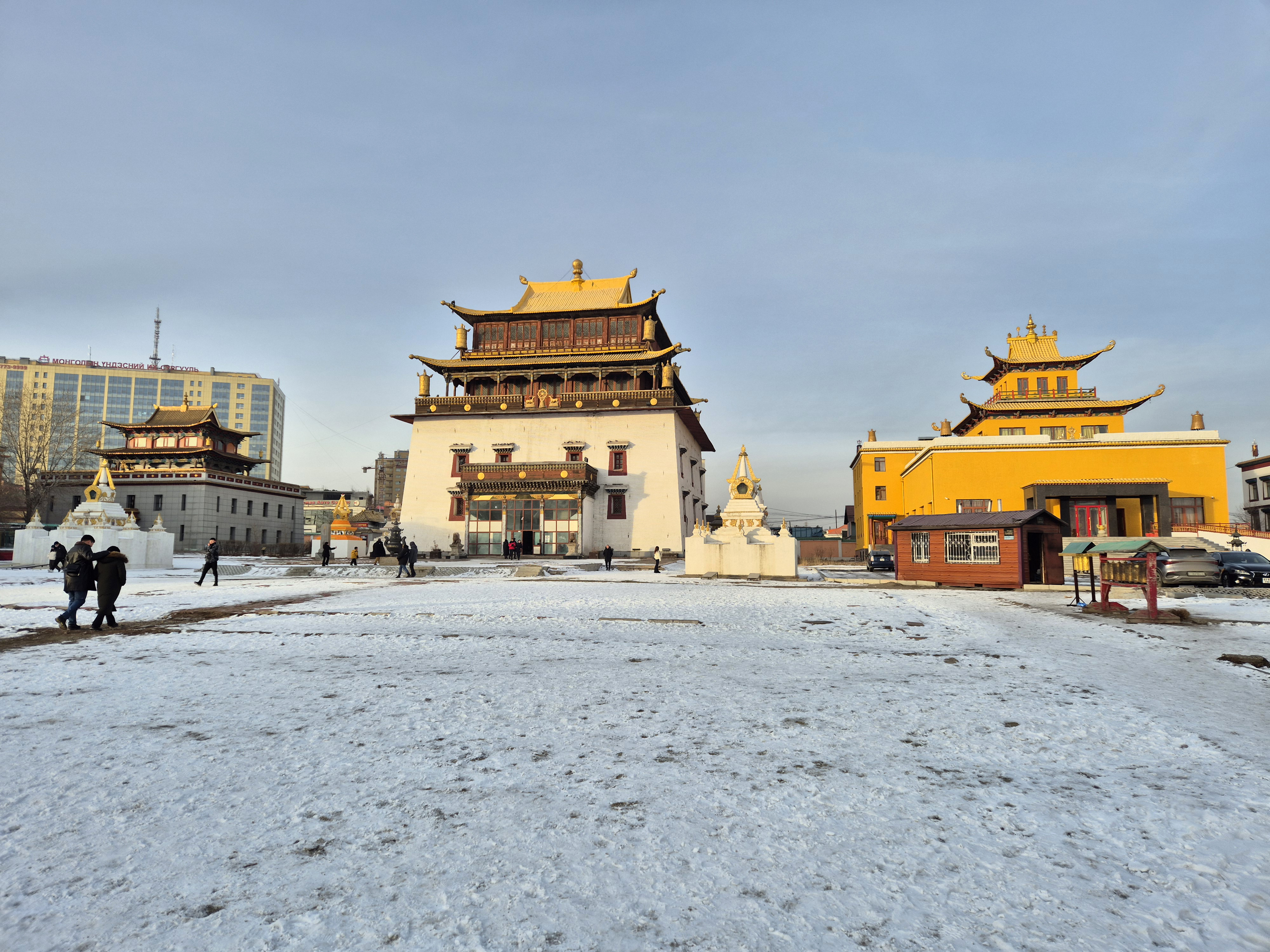

- Location within Mongolia

Religion
- Affiliation: Tibetan Buddhism
- Sect: Gelug

Location
- Location: Bayangol, Ulaanbaatar
- Country: Mongolia
- Interactive map of Gandantegchinlen Monastery
- Coordinates: 47°55′23″N 106°53′42″E

Architecture
- Style: Mongolian, Tibetan, and Chinese influences
- Established: 1809

Gandantegchinlen Monastery (Mongolian: Гандантэгчэнлин хийд, Gandantegchenlin khiid), also known as Gandan Monastery, is a Buddhist monastery in Bayangol District, Ulaanbaatar, Mongolia. It was founded in 1809, closed amid persecutions in 1939, and from 1944 to 1989 was the country's only active monastery. Today, it is the center of Buddhism in Mongolia. The monastery has more than 100 resident monks and numerous Buddhist treasures, including a 26-metre (85 ft) statue of Avalokiteśvara made of gilded bronze and precious stones.

== Name ==
The name of the monastery, Gandantegchinlen (Tibetan for "complete rejoicing"), is derived from Ganden Monastery in Tibet, established by Je Tsongkhapa, the founder of the Gelug sect of Tibetan Buddhism. Its translated name in Mongolian is Tegüsbayaskhulangtu, and in Sanskrit it is Tushitamahayanavipa.

== History ==
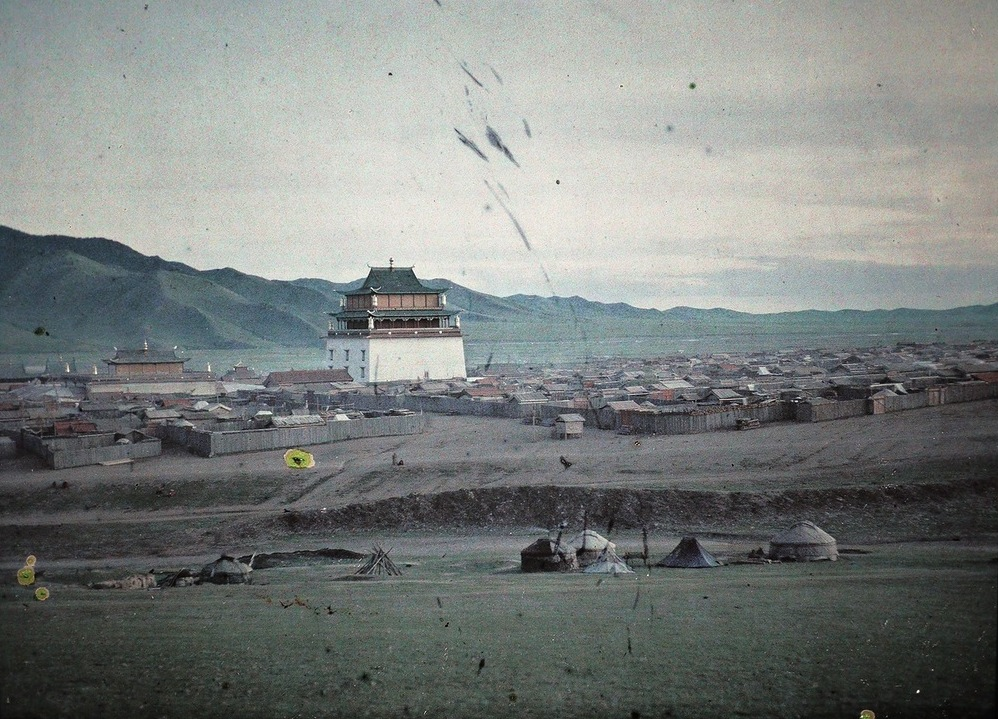
Gandantegchinlen Monastery in 1913

The second Jebtsundamba Khutuktu established a tsanid (Buddhist education center) for the monks of Khüree (modern Ulaanbaatar) in the early 18th century. Datsan (colleges) were built at Dashchoinpel (in 1736), Gungaachoilin (in 1809), and Idgaachoinzinlin (in 1912).

At Gungaachoilin, on a hill west of Khüree, Shar Temple was built in 1809, followed by the Lamrin dugan (assembly hall) in 1824. After he ordered the Khüree clergy to move west, further from encroaching Chinese buildings, the fifth Jebtsundamba Khutuktu built a palace, named Gandantegchinlen, just south of Shar Temple between 1834 and 1838; the monastery itself also took this name. Other buildings were added, including the Tsogchin dugan in 1839 and Ochirdari (Vajradhara) Temple in 1840, which has a silver and gold statue created in 1683 by Zanabazar. Jüd (Tantra) Temple, founded in 1739 by the second Jebtsundamba Khutuktu, is now housed in a yurt. The fifth, seventh, and eighth Jebtsundamba Khutuktus were interred at Gandan, though in 1855 they and their monks moved back to their original palace near the current city center. To celebrate independence from Qing China in 1911, the eighth Jebtsundamba Khutuktu ordered the construction of Megzed Janraiseg (Eye-Opening Avalokiteśvara) Temple, completed in 1913 as Mongolia's tallest monastery building. It had a 25.6-metre (84 ft) statue of the boddhisatva Avalokiteśvara made of gilded bronze and precious stones.

Gandan was closed in 1939 during the Stalinist anti-religious persecutions in Mongolia, and its dugan buildings were razed. Escaping the mass destruction of other monasteries, its surviving buildings were used to house the administration of Töv Province. In 1940, the monastery was placed under direct Soviet military command and used as a stable, ammunition store, and firing range. The statue of Avalokiteśvara was broken apart in 1937 (alternatively by Soviet soldiers in 1938 or 1943), and is thought to have been shipped to Moscow and melted down. In January 1944, the monastery was reopened by dictator Khorloogiin Choibalsan (on the recommendation of Joseph Stalin) as the country's only working monastery. By 1947, it had 57 monks and was holding public services. That year, Mongolian scholars, aided by a few Soviet advisers, intervened to save the Megzed Janraiseg Temple from demolition, and in 1961 the temple was made a national cultural monument.

With the advent of religious freedom in 1990, when Mongolia established an independent, democratic government, Gandan expanded to 200 monks and began a full-scale renovation. In 1996, a new 26.5-metre (87 ft) statue of Avalokiteśvara, modeled on the old, was dedicated. Built over six years using a mix of government and private funds, it weighs 90 tons and is made of 20 tons of copper, 25 kilograms (55 lb) of silver, 8.6 kilograms (19 lb) of gold, and over 2,100 precious stones.

As of 2004, Gandan is Mongolia's largest active monastery, with 100 monks. It has 70,000 Buddhist manuscripts and woodblock prints, including the 108-volume Ganjuur (precepts), 226-volume Danjuur (commentaries), and other works in Mongolian, Tibetan, and Sanskrit, some written in the "nine precious materials": gold, silver, turquoise, lapis lazuli, coral, pearl, mother-of-pearl, copper, and steel. The monastery's other treasures include a 15-kilogram (33 lb) silver statue of Tsongkhapa. Despite development in Ulaanbaatar, its vicinity has remained occupied by the monks' yurts. Gandan is considered the center of Mongolian Buddhism, and its khamba lama (abbot) is held to be its leader. Since 1992, the abbot of Gandan has been Gabju Demberel Choijamts.

== Gallery ==
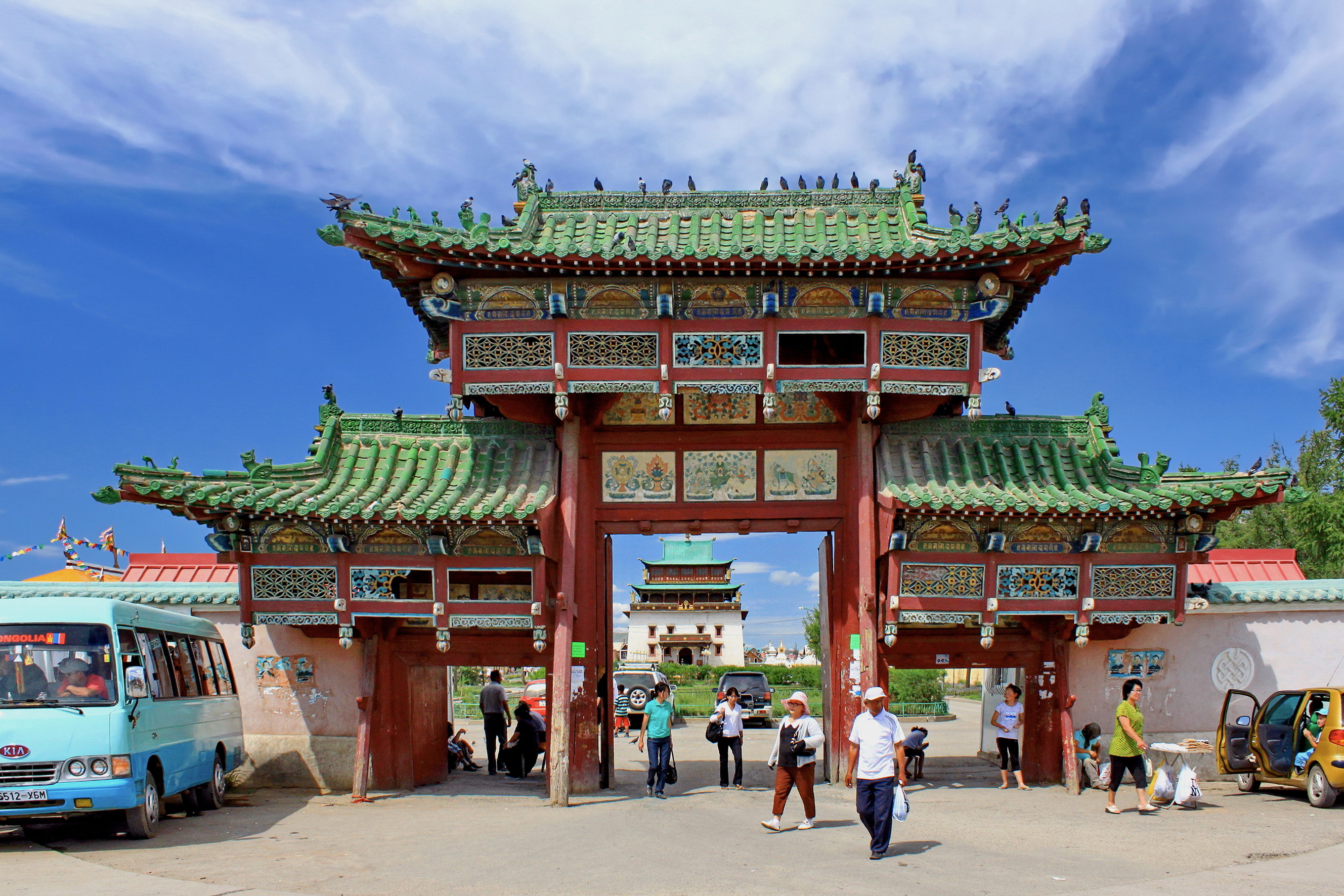
Southern gateway

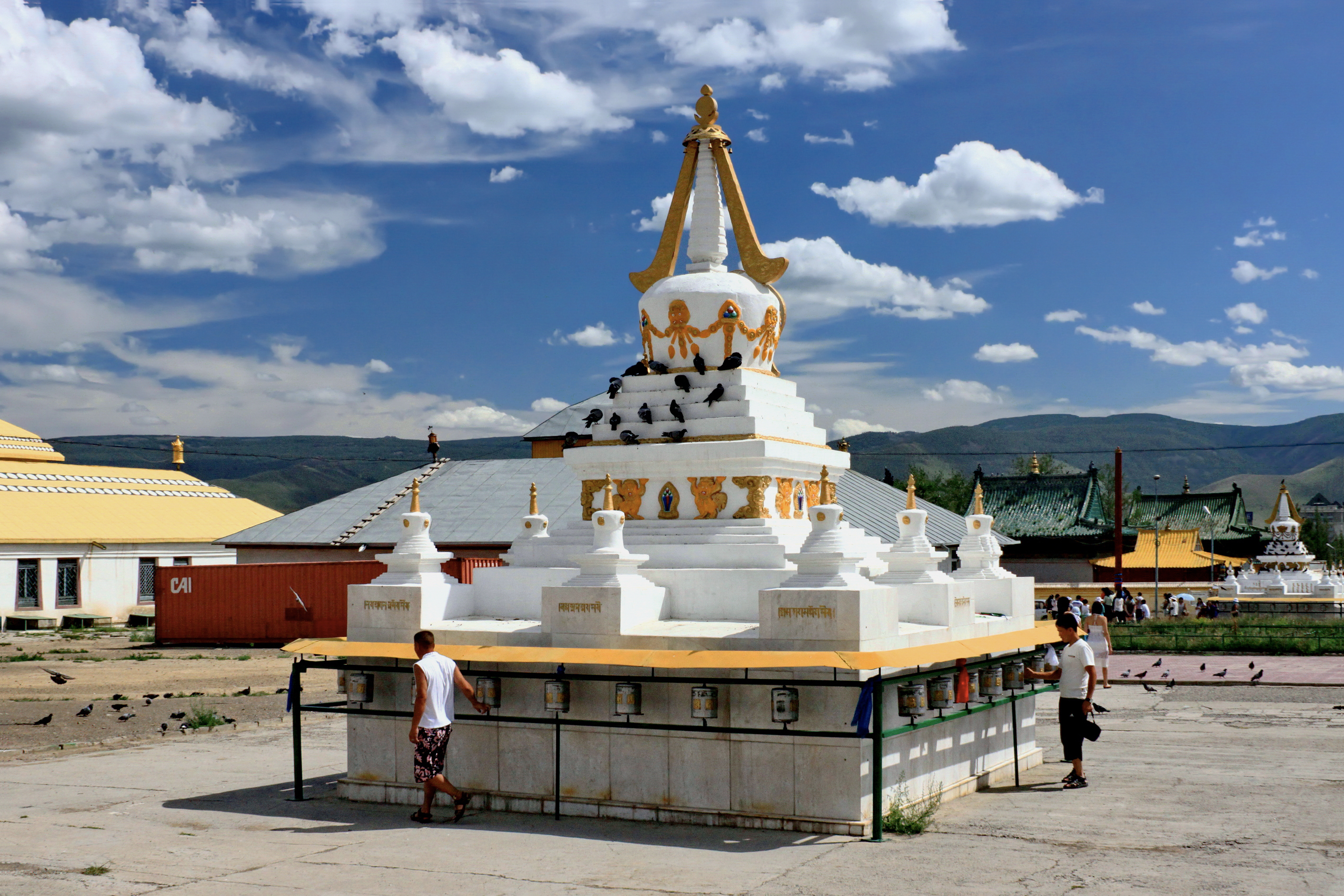
Stupa

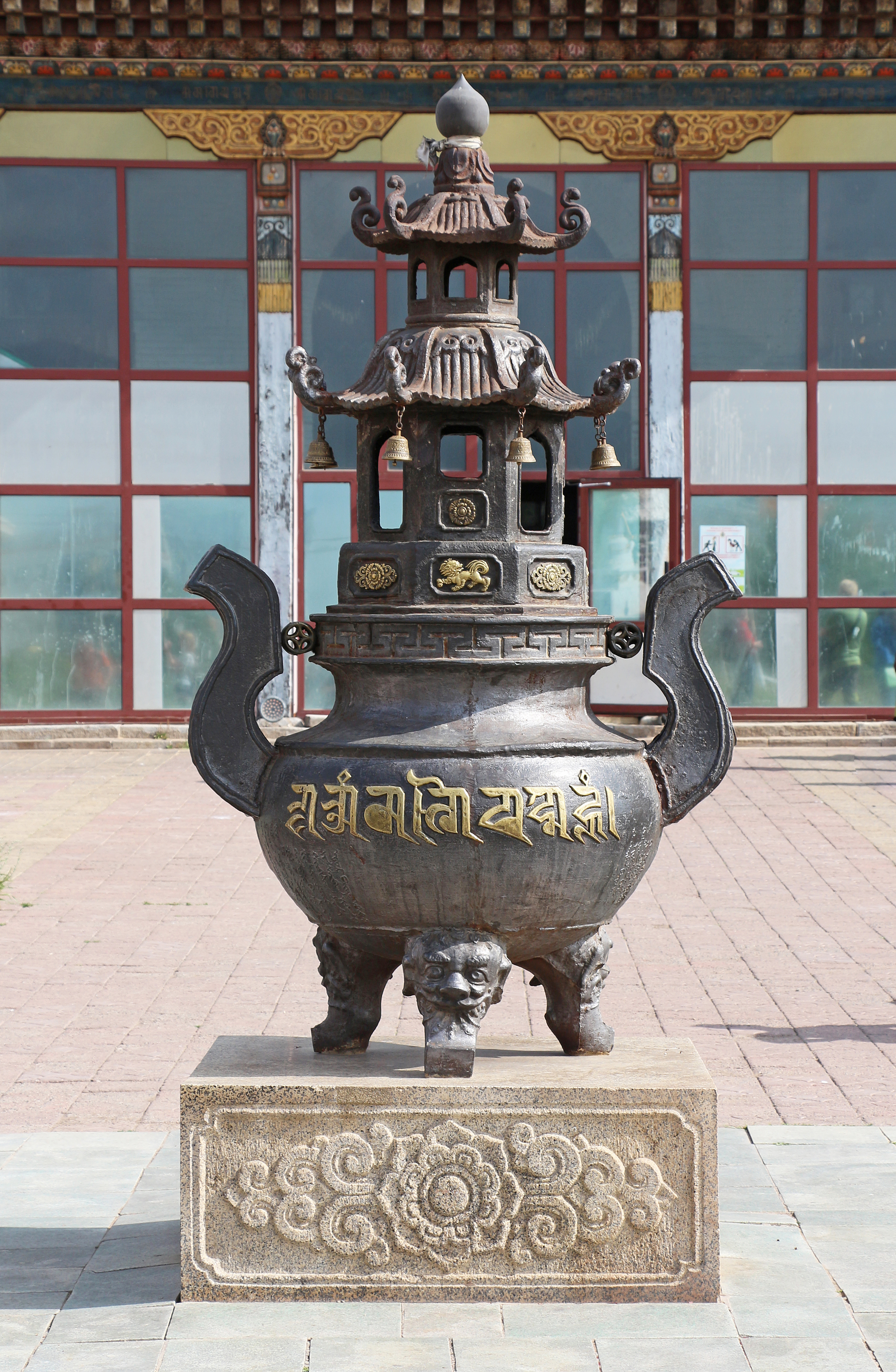
Incense burner

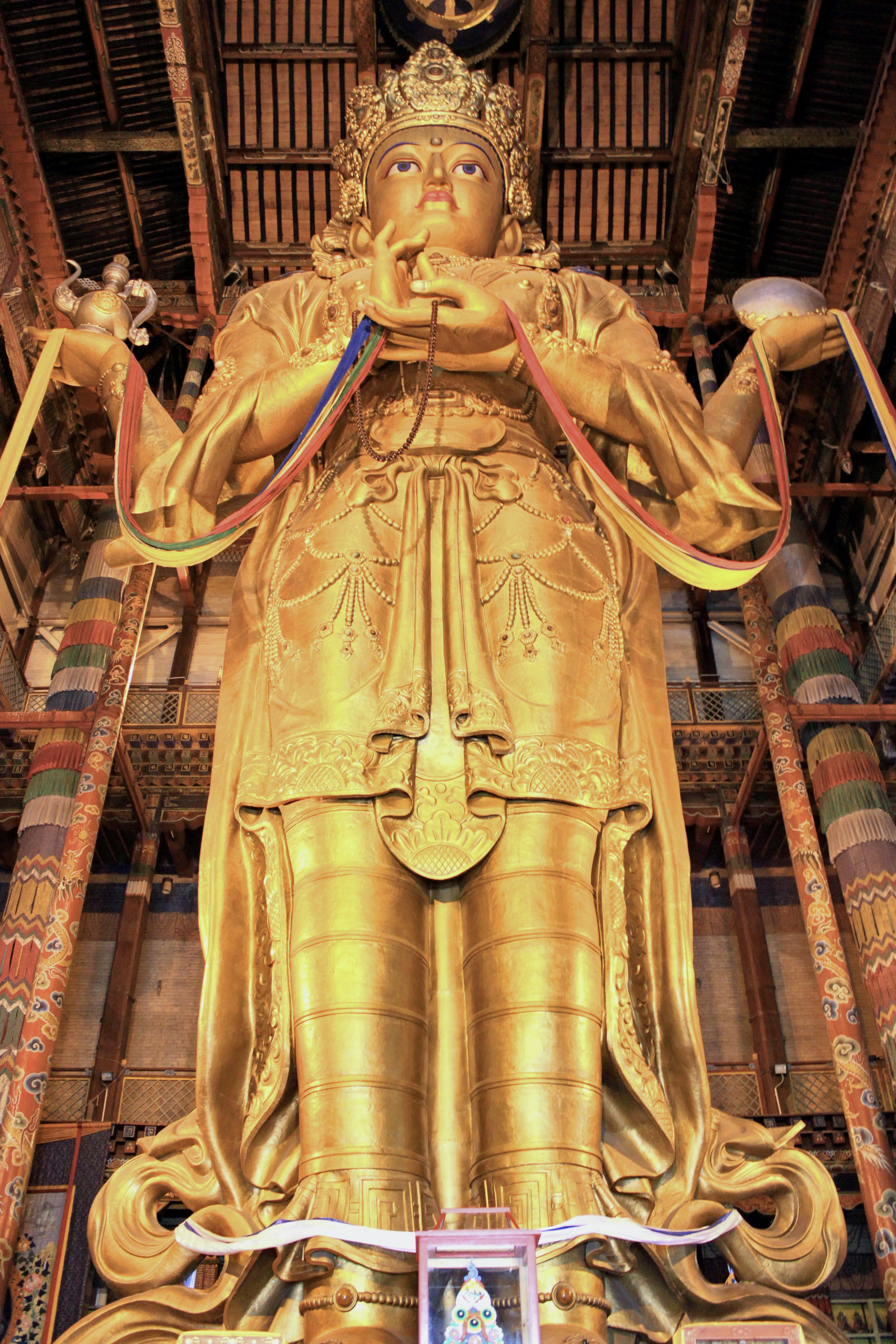
Statue of Avalokiteśvara

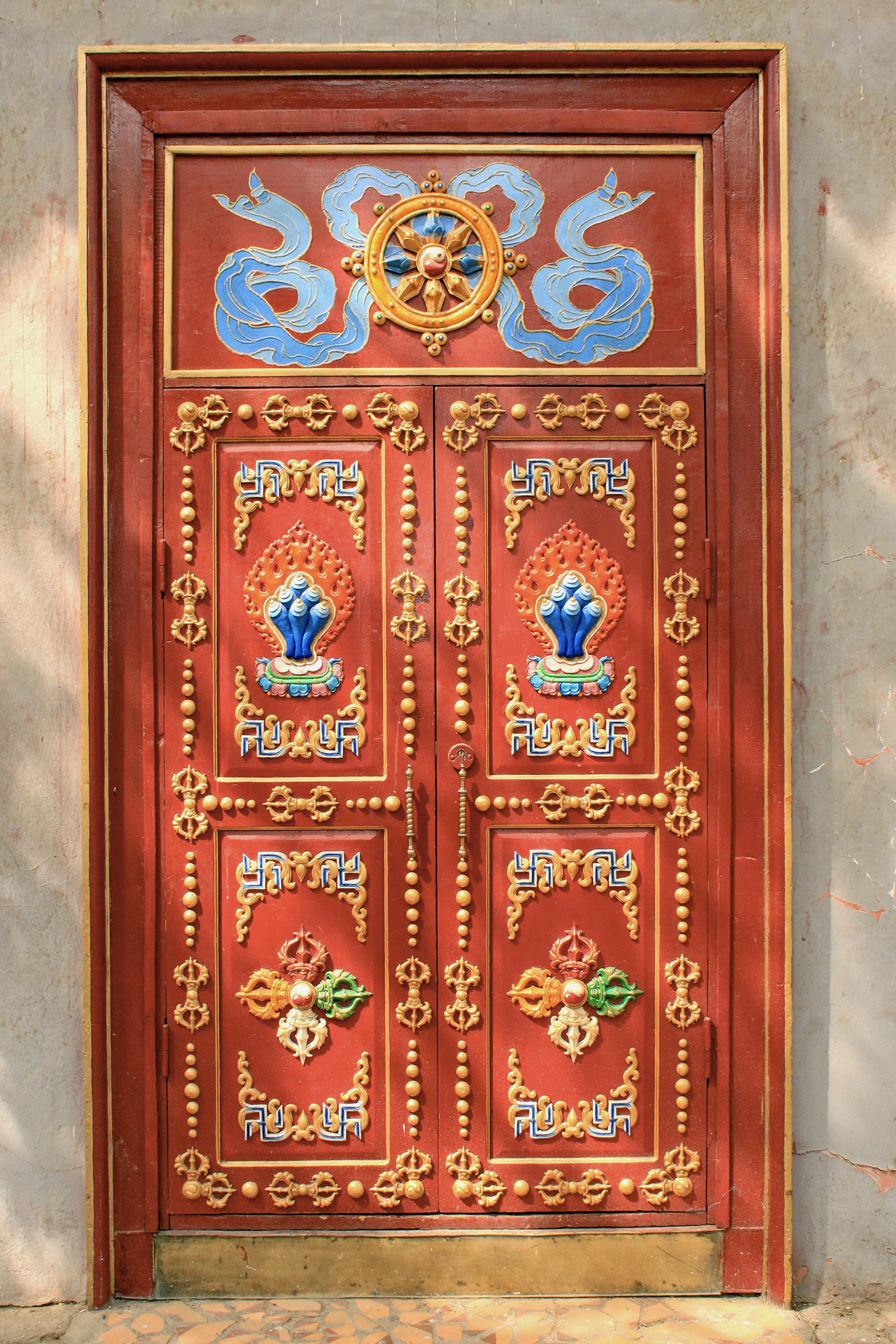
Decorated door of Dzuu Temple

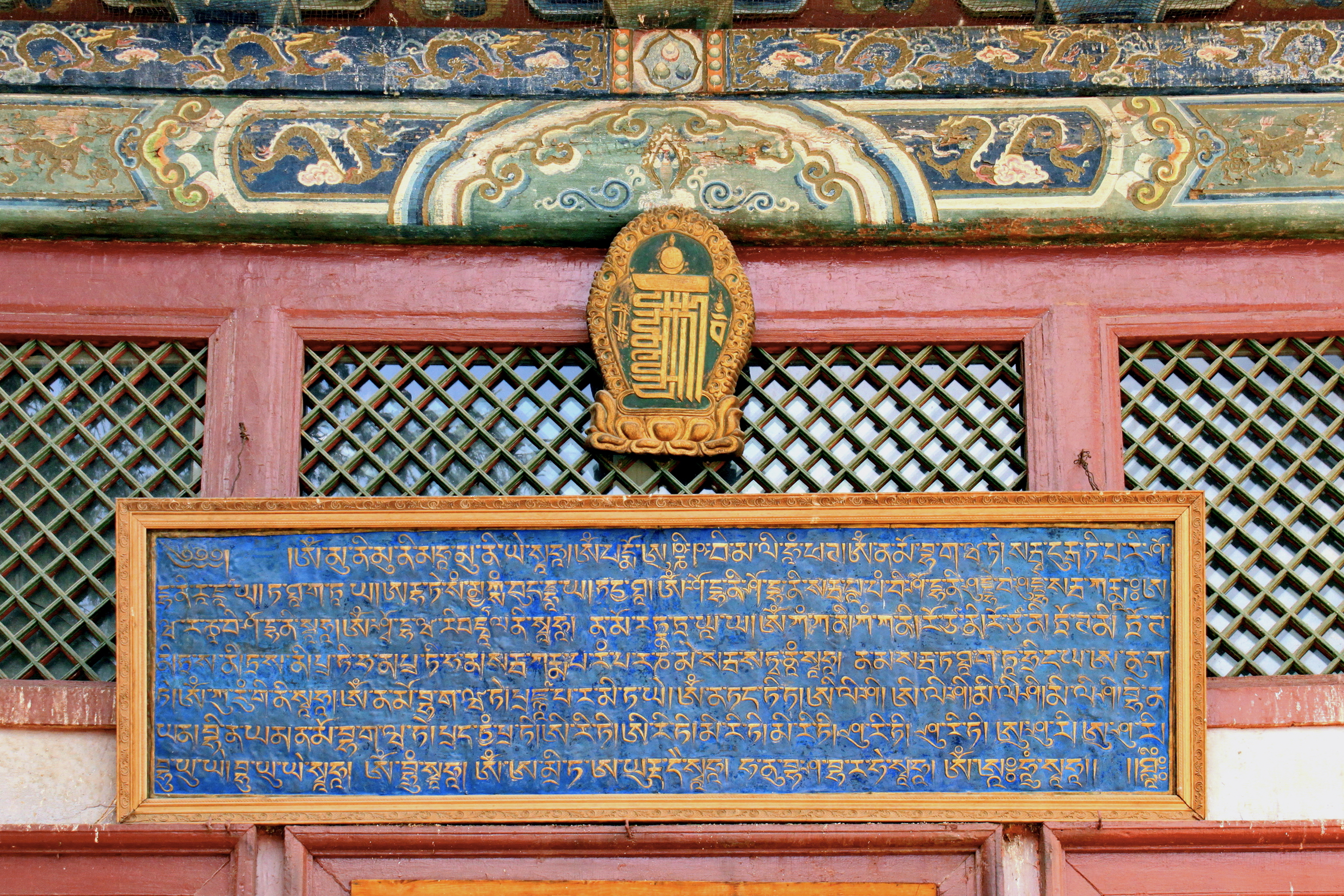
Inscription at entrance to Ochirdari Temple

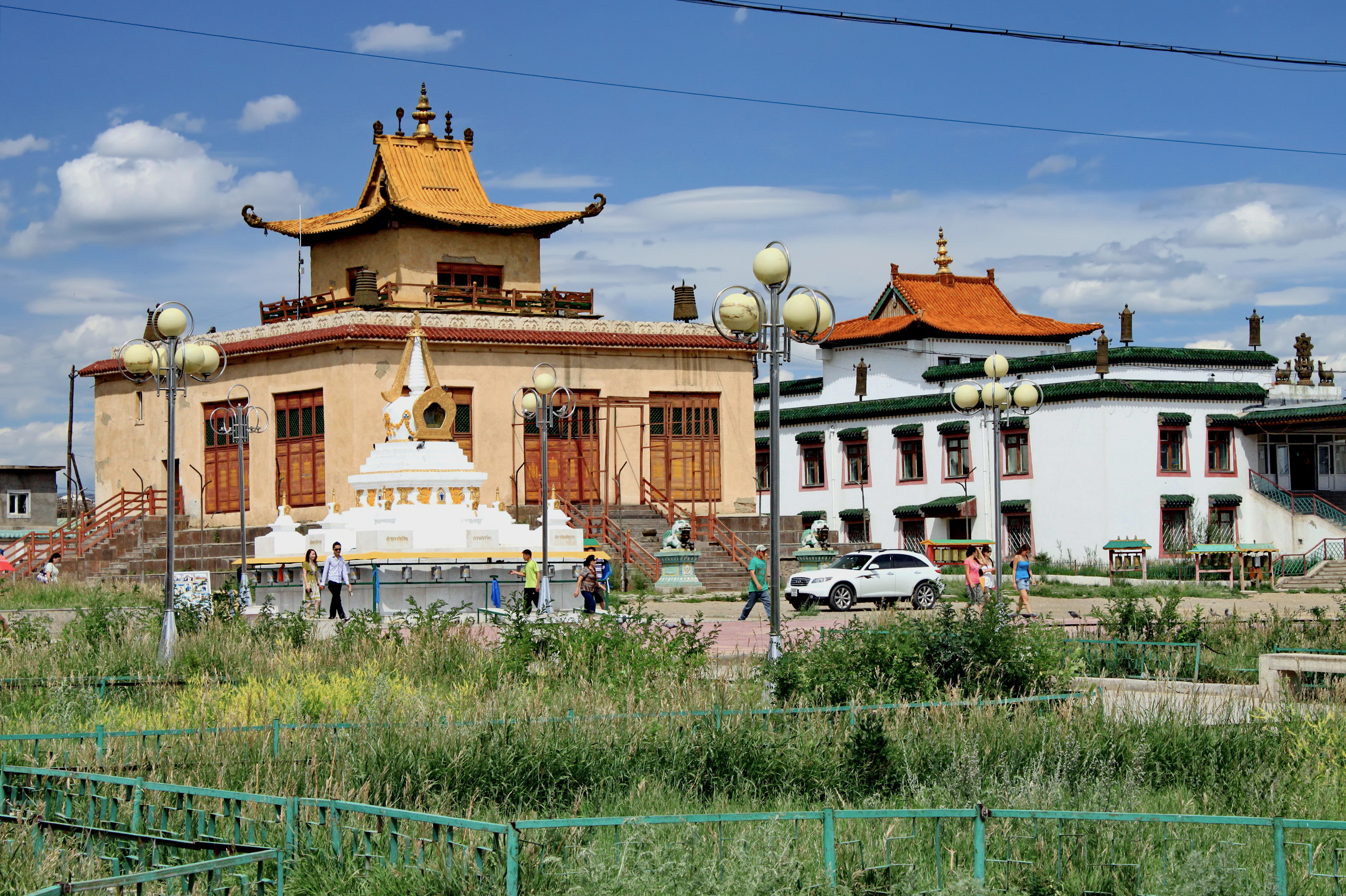
Monastery buildings

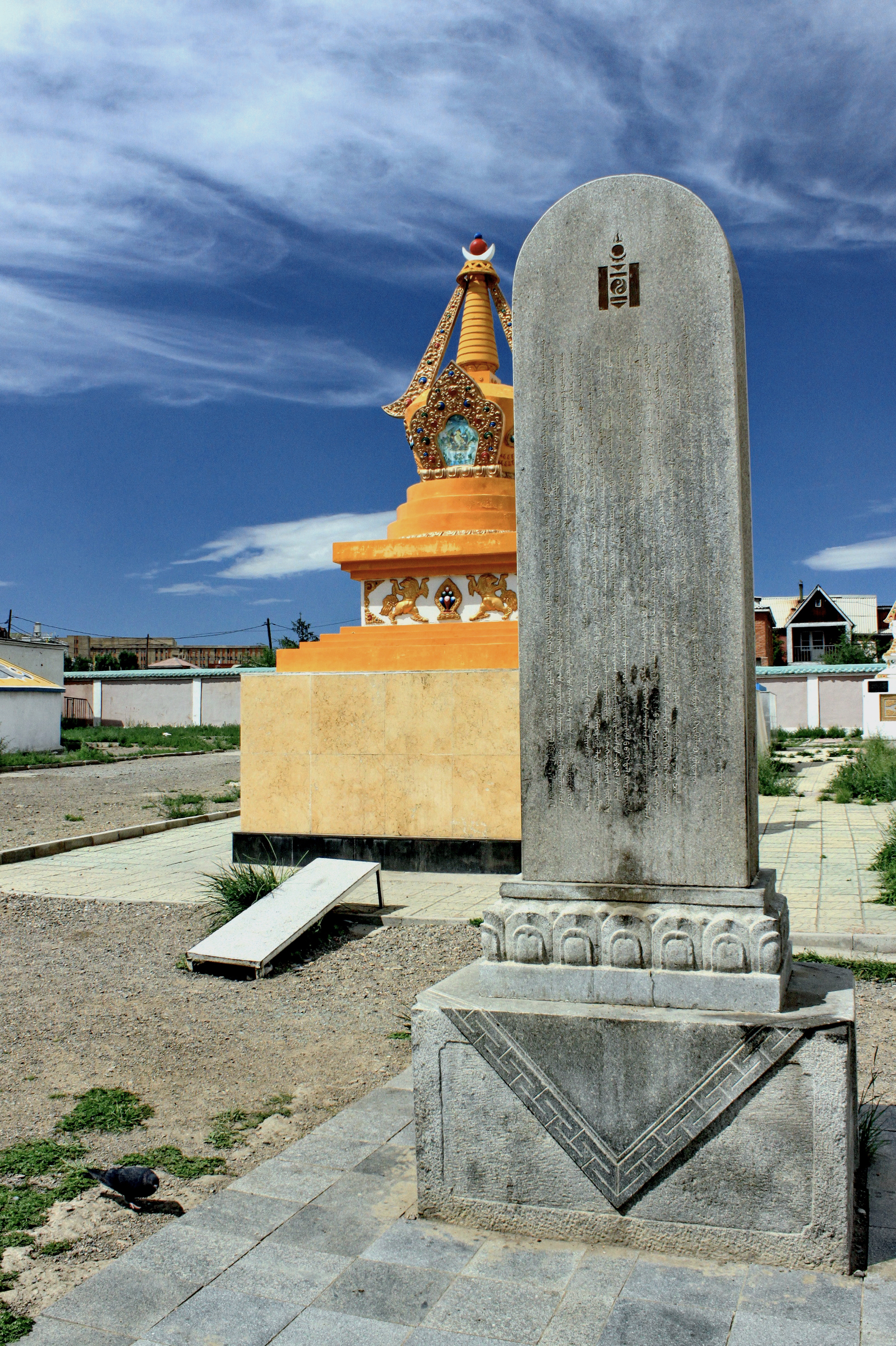
Stone tablet with Soyombo symbol

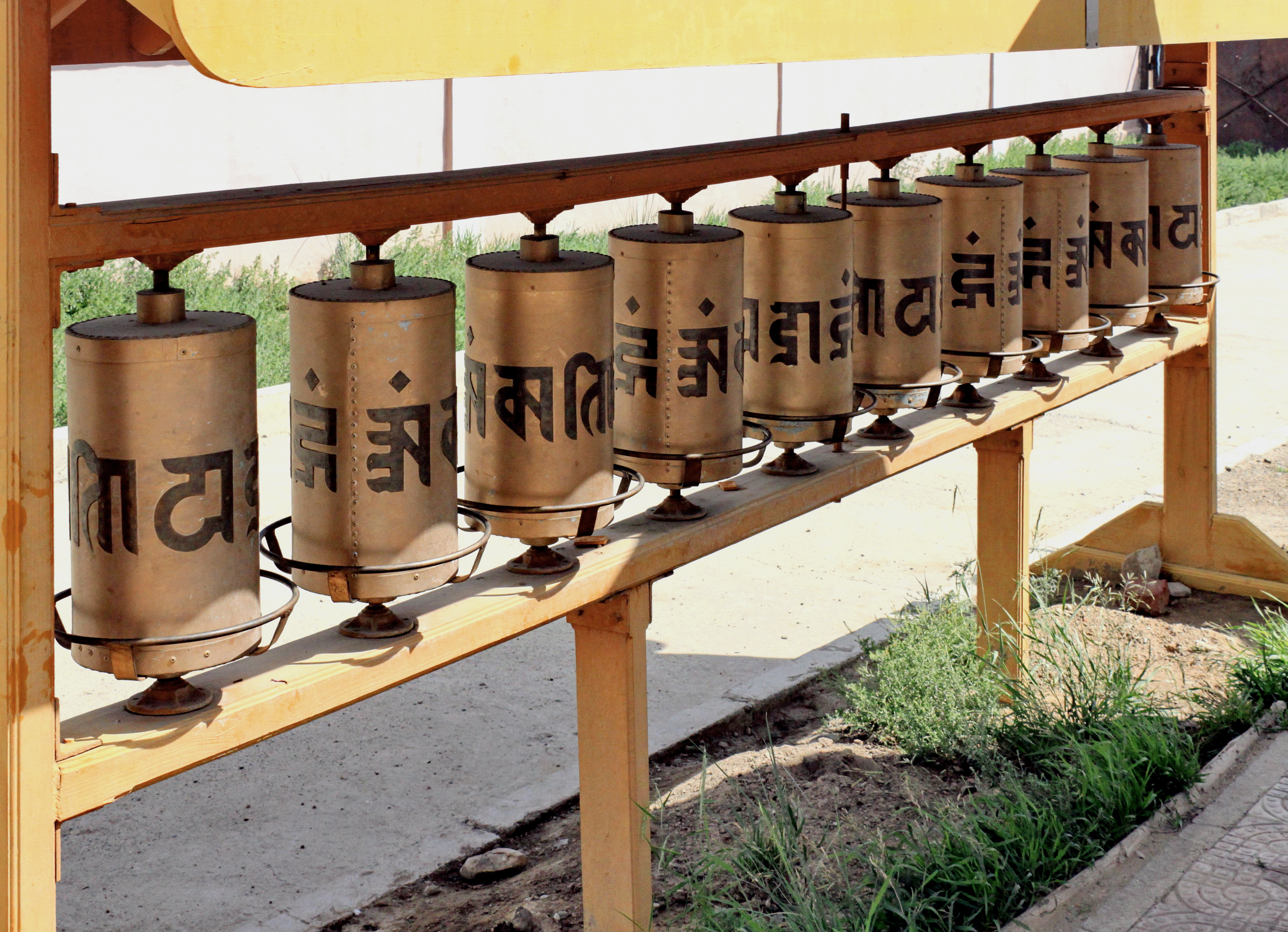
Prayer wheels

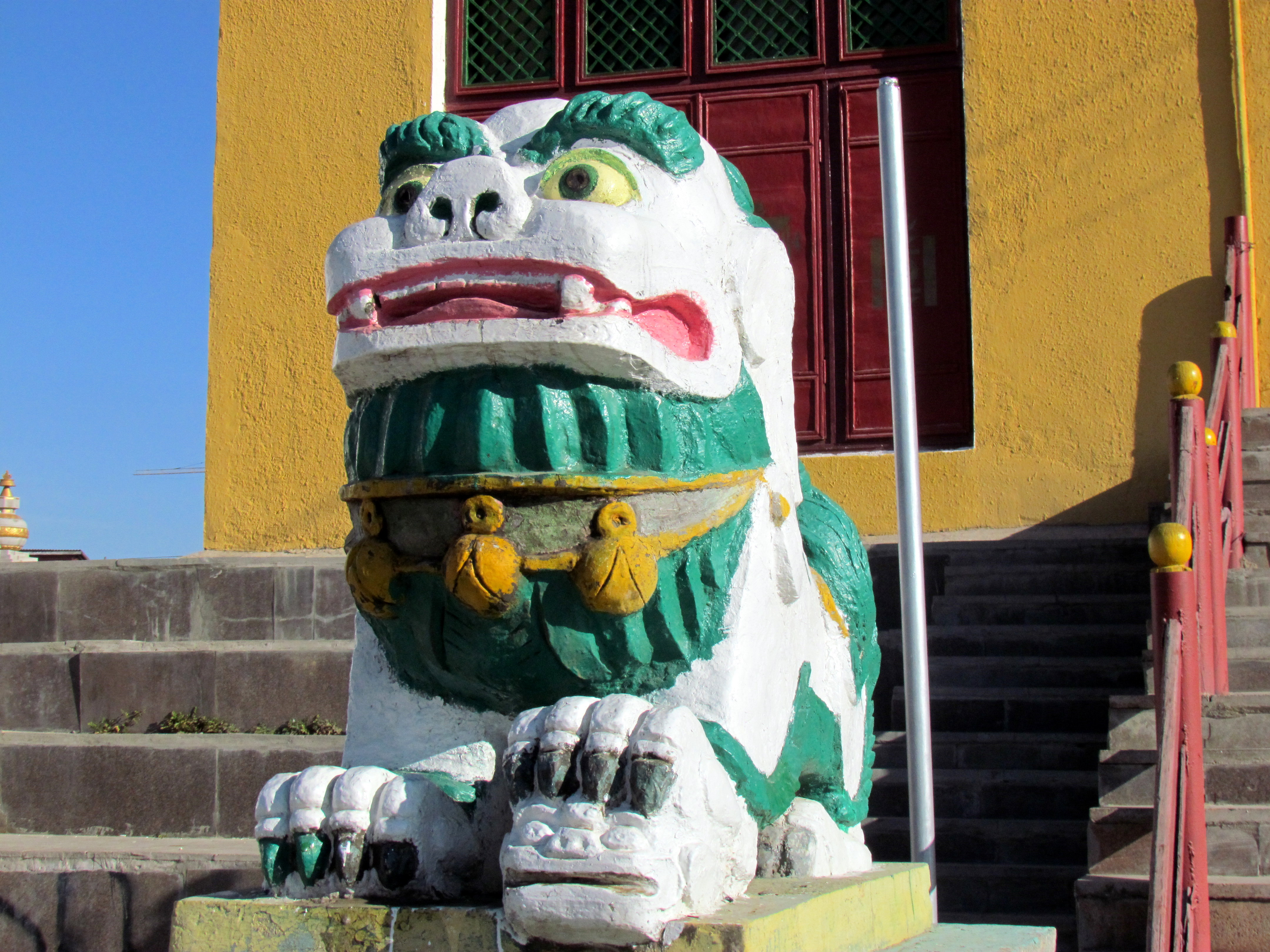
Snow Lion
