= 10th Jebtsundamba Khutuktu =

Mongolian Buddhist leader (born c. 2015)

10th Jebtsundamba Khutuktu, A. Altannar
- Title: His Holiness the 10th Jebtsundamba Khutuktu

Personal life
- Born: A. Altannar (Note: The 10th Jebtsundamba Khutughtu was born as one of two twins. In order to protect his identity, only his surname is given. His name is either Achildai Altannar (Mongolian: Алтаннарын Ачилтай; Chinese: 阿其勒泰 or Agudai Altannar (Mongolian: Алтаннарын Агуйдай; Chinese: 阿圭代).) c. 2015 (age 10–11) Washington, D.C., United States

Religious life
- Religion: Tibetan Buddhism
- School: Gelug

Senior posting
- Period in office: 8 March 2023 – present
- Predecessor: 9th Jebtsundamba Khutughtu, Jampal Namdröl Chökyi Gyaltsen

Mongolian name
- Mongolian Cyrillic: Алтаннарын А.

The 10th Jebtsundamba Khutughtu (born A. Altannar, c. 2015), also known as the 10th Bogd is the 10th reincarnation of the Jebtsundamba Khutuktu, the spiritual leader of the Gelug lineage of Buddhism in Mongolia.

== Identification process ==
During the 14th Dalai Lama's last visit to Mongolia in November 2016, he held a press conference on 23 November 2016 stating his belief that the 10th Jebtsundamba Khutughtu had just been (re)born in Mongolia.

On 8 March 2023, the 14th Dalai Lama publicly acknowledged the 10th reincarnation of the Jebtsundamba Khutughtu at a ceremony in Dharamshala, India, saying:

"We have the reincarnation of Khalkha Jetsun Dhampa [Jebtsundamba] Rinpoché of Mongolia with us today. His predecessors had a close association with the Krishnacharya lineage of Chakrasamvara. One of them established a monastery in Mongolia dedicated to its practice. So, his being here today is quite auspicious."

The week after the Dalai Lama's visit, China imposed tariffs on Mongolia and closed a key border crossing, causing major traffic jams and stranding truck drivers in sub-zero temperatures for days. China also broke off negotiations with Mongolia for a $4.2 billion loan.

The child is one of a pair of identical twin boys and was born in Washington, D.C. to Khalkha Mongolian parents, thereby giving him American citizenship. To protect the identity of the 10th Jebtsundamba Khutughtu, the twins, Achildai Altannar and Agudai Altannar, are almost always seen in public together. The name of the 10th Bogd is given only as A. Altannar; neither the parents, nor the Dalai Lama have stated which child was presented at the March 2023 ceremony.

The boy and his brother are the children of Altannar Chinchuluun, a mathematics professor at the National University of Mongolia, and Munkhnasan Narmandakh, CEO of Monpolymet Group, a mining and construction conglomerate founded by her mother, former Mongolian parliament member and founder of Monpolymet Group Tsedengiin Garamjav. In July 2025, Telo Rinpoche, former head of the Buddhists of the Republic of Kalmykia and envoy of the Dalai Lama to Russia, Mongolia and the Commonwealth of Independent States, revealed that the influence of the Chinese government on Mongolia is blocking its traditional recognition and enthronement.

== See also ==
- Succession of the 14th Dalai Lama
- 11th Panchen Lama controversy
- Karmapa controversy
