= Jebtsundamba Khutuktu =

Spiritual head of Gelug Tibetan Buddhism in Mongolia

The Jebtsundamba Khutuktu (Note: Mongolian: Жавзандамба хутагт, Jabhzandamba khutagt, pronounced [ˈt͡ɕaw̜t͡sn̩tm̩p ˈχʊʰtəχtʰ]; Chinese: 哲布尊丹巴呼圖克圖; pinyin: Zhébùzūn Dānbā Hūtúkètú; Standard Tibetan: རྗེ་བཙུན་དམ་པ་ཧུ་ཐུག་ཐུ་, romanized: Jetsün Dampa Hutuktu; lit. "Venerable Excellent incarnate lama") or Khalkha Jetsün Dampa Rinpoche is the spiritual head of the Gelug lineage of Tibetan Buddhism in Mongolia. They also hold the title of Bogd Gegeen, making them the top-ranked lama in Mongolia.

== History ==
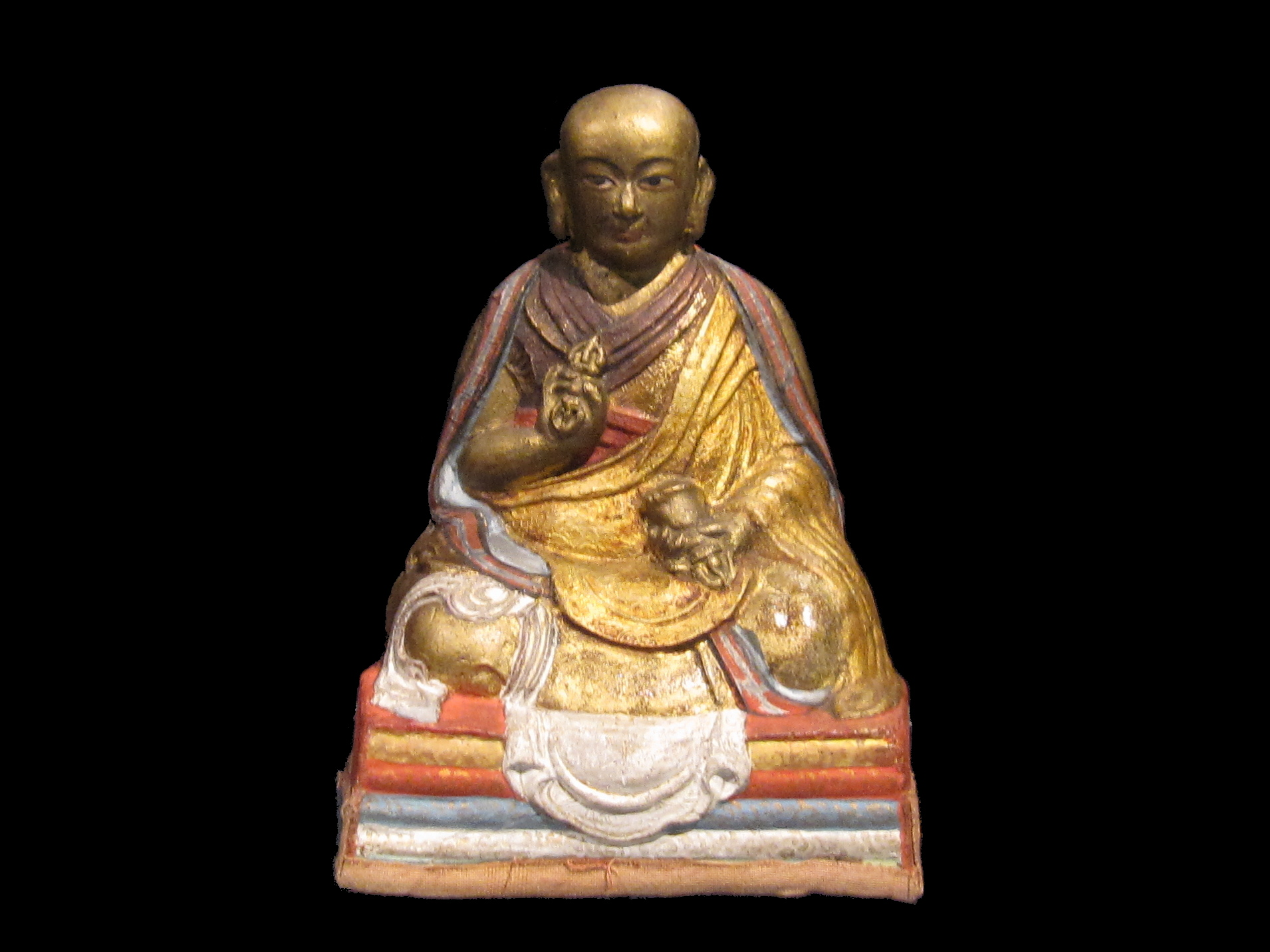
Statue of Zanabazar, the 1st Jebtsundamba

The first Jebtsundamba, Zanabazar (1635–1723), was identified as the reincarnation of the scholar Taranatha of the Jonang school of Tibetan Buddhism. Zanabazar was the son of the Tüsheet Khan Gombodorj, ruler of central Khalkha Mongolia, and himself became the spiritual head of the Khalkha Mongols.

On May 29, the Jebtsundamba Khutukhtu paid homage to the Kangxi Emperor in 1691 at Dolon Nor.

Like Zanabazar, the 2nd Jebtsundamba Khutughtu was a member of Mongolia's highest nobility and direct descendant of Genghis Khan. After Chingünjav's rebellion and the demise of the second Jebtsundamba Khutukhtu, the Qianlong Emperor of the Qing dynasty decreed in 1758 that all future reincarnations were to be found from among the population of Tibet.

When the region of Outer Mongolia declared independence from the fallen Qing dynasty in 1911, the eighth Jebtsundamba (1869–1924) was elevated to a theocratic ruler called the Bogd Khan, and established the Bogd Khanate of Mongolia. He was the head of state until his death in 1924. The communist government of the Mongolian People's Republic, which replaced the theocracy in 1924, declared there would be no further reincarnations.

A reincarnation was in fact found almost at once in north Mongolia, and some high lamas of the previous Khutukhtu’s retinue went to interview the child's mother, Tsendjav. They also briefed her on details of the life of the former incarnation, so she could familiarize the child-candidate with tests which he would have to undergo. Faced with the possibility of a new Khutukhtu who was born within Mongolia and not even a foreigner from Tibet, the Central Committee of the Mongolian People's Revolutionary Party decided in July 1925 to turn the matter over to the elderly 13th Dalai Lama in Lhasa. The Dalai Lama's decision would nonetheless be subject to new Mongolian legislation for the separation of church and state. In February 1929, the installation of any new Khutukhtu was forbidden.

A 9th Jebtsundamba Khutukhtu was installed by the 14th Dalai Lama as the head of a reinvigorated Jonang lineage. He was born Jampal Namdol Chökyi Gyaltsen in 1932, and he died in early 2012. Despite the Chinese government's claim to have inherited the authority and ultimate decision right for the choice of successor of all high lamas in Mongolia and Tibet, the 9th Jebstundamba will be reincarnated within independent Mongolia and the selection will be confirmed by the Dalai Lama. This puts China in a dilemma of endangering bilateral relations with Mongolia for the choice of the next Lama, or to forfeit their claim of control over religious affairs. This in effect also means ultimately giving up authority over selection of the next Dalai Lama, and puts to question their current choice of the Panchen Lama.

== List of Jebtsundamba Khutukhtus ==
Bogdo Gegeen (Mongolian and ceremonial Tibetan language names):

Title	Portrait	Name Wylie transliteration	Recognition	Notes
1st Jebtsundamba Khutughtu		Öndör Gegeen Zanabazar Blo bzang bstan pa'i rgyal mtshan	1635–1723	
2nd Jebtsundamba Khutughtu		Luvsandambiydonmi Blo bzang bstan pa'i srgon me	1724–1757	
3rd Jebtsundamba Khutughtu		Ishdambiynyam Ye shes bstan pa'i nyi ma	1758–1773	
4th Jebtsundamba Khutughtu		Luvsantüvdenvanchug Blo bzang thub bstan dbang phyug	1775–1813	
5th Jebtsundamba Khutughtu		Luvsanchültimjigmed Blo bzang tshul khrim 'jigs med	1815–1841	
6th Jebtsundamba Khutughtu		Luvsantüvdenchoyjijaltsan Blo bzang dpal ldan bstan pa	1843–1848	
7th Jebtsundamba Khutughtu		Agvaanchoyjivanchugperenlaijamts Ngag dbang chos kyi dbang phyug 'phrin las rgya mtsho	1850–1868	
8th Jebtsundamba Khutughtu and Bogd Khan		Agvaanluvsanchoyjinyamdanzanvaanchigbalsambuu Ngag dbang blo bzang chos rje nyi ma bstan 'dzin dbang phyug rJe btsun dam pa Bla ma	1870 – 20 May 1924	Reigned as Khagan (head of state) of the Bogd Khanate of Mongolia from 29 December 1911 until his death.
9th Jebtsundamba Khutughtu		Jambalnamdolchoyjijantsan (Jampal Namdrol Chokye Gyeltsen) 'Jam dpal rnam grol chos kyi rgyal mtshan	1936 – 1 March 2012	Born 1933; from 1991, recognized by the 14th Dalai Lama; exiled in Tibet to 1959, then in India; died in Ulaanbaatar.
10th Jebtsundamba Khutughtu		A. Altannar	8 March 2023 – present	In November 2016, during a visit to Mongolia, the 14th Dalai Lama announced his belief that the 10th Jebtsundamba Khutughtu had been reborn in Mongolia and that a process for identifying him had begun. On 8 March 2023, at a ceremony in Dharamsala, the Dalai Lama announced the presence at the ceremony of the 10th Jebtsundamba Khutuktu.
