= Battles of Choir and Zamyn-Üüd =

1921 battles in eastern Mongolia

- Part of the Occupation of Mongolia and Russian Civil War
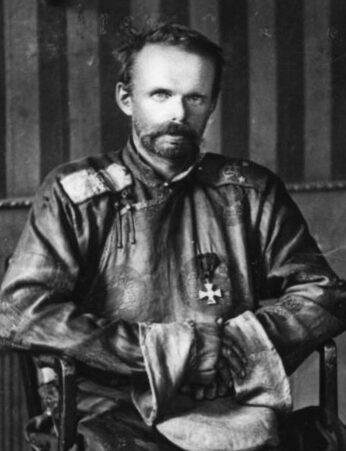
- Roman Ungern, the commander that lead his army in these battles
Date	March 1921
Location	Choir, Zamyn-Üüd, Mongolia
Result	Russian victory: Ungern's troops capture Choir and Zamyn-Üüd; Withdrawal of Chinese troops

Belligerents
(Russia) White movement	Republic of China

Commanders and leaders
(Russia) Roman von Ungern-Sternberg	Unknown

Units involved
(Russia) Asiatic Cavalry Division	Unknown

Strength
(Russia) 900 soldiers	1,500 defenders In Choir; Unknown in Zamyn-Üüd

The Battles of Choir and Zamyn-Üüd happened during March 1921, when Ungern successfully captured Choir and Zamyn-Üüd.

== Background ==
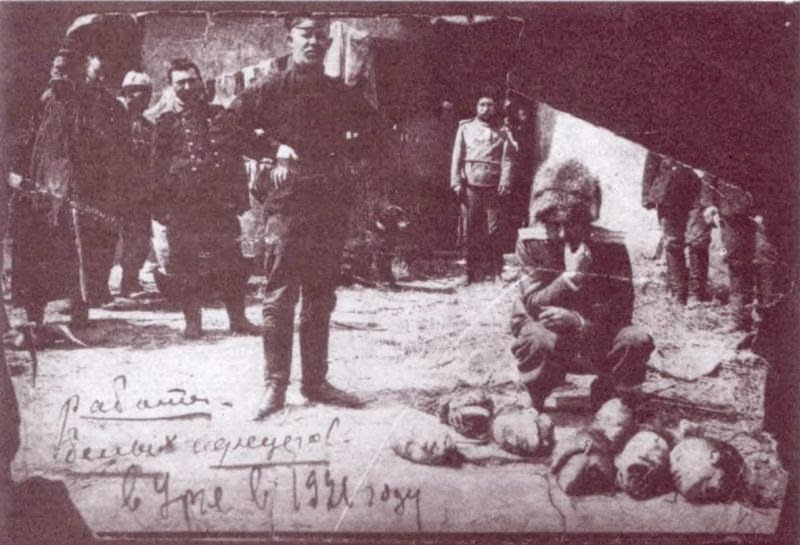
Russian soldiers in Urga after its capture

After Ungern and his troops captured Maimaicheng, they attacked Chinese troops at the Consular Settlement. After Chinese troops counterattacked, Ungern's soldiers retreated. Ungern then launched another attack with support of a Cossack and Mongolian detachment, which came from the northeast and northwest while Ungern's troops moved westwards in Urga, pursuing retreating Chinese soldiers. The capital was finally captured on 4 February. Russian settlers who supported the Red Army moved from Urga together with Chinese soldiers who were retreating. During the Battle of Urga, the Chinese suffered 1,500 casualties while Ungern's forces suffered only around 60 casualties. After the capture of Urga, Ungern's troops started killing Russian Jews. Ungern personally ordered Jews to be killed. This pogrom effectively eliminated the Jewish community in Urga.

== Capture of Choir and Zamyn-Üüd ==
Between 11 and 13 March, Ungern and his soldiers captured the Chinese base at Choir. Ungern's army had 900 troops while Chinese defenders had about 1,500. After Ungern successfully captured Choir, he returned to Urga. His detachments moved southward to Zamyn-Üüd, a frontier settlement that had another Chinese base. The defending Chinese soldiers abandoned Zamyn-Üüd without a fight.

== Sources ==
- Jennings, John M. (2022). "Roman Fedorovich von Ungern-Sternberg". In Jennings, John M.; Steele, Chuck (eds.). The Worst Military Leaders in History. London: Reaktion Books. ISBN 9781789145830.
- Kuzmin, Sergei L., ed. (2004). Legendarnyi Baron: Neizvestnye Stranitsy Grazhdanskoi Voiny (in Russian). Moscow: KMK Sci. Press. ISBN 978-5-87317-175-0.
  - Tornovsky, M. G. "Events in Mongolia-Khalkha in 1920–1921". In Kuzmin (2004).
- Kuzmin, Sergei L. (2011). The History of Baron Ungern. An Experience of Reconstruction. Moscow: KMK Sci. Press. ISBN 978-5-87317-692-2.
