= Boris Rezukhin =

Russian major general (1886–1921)

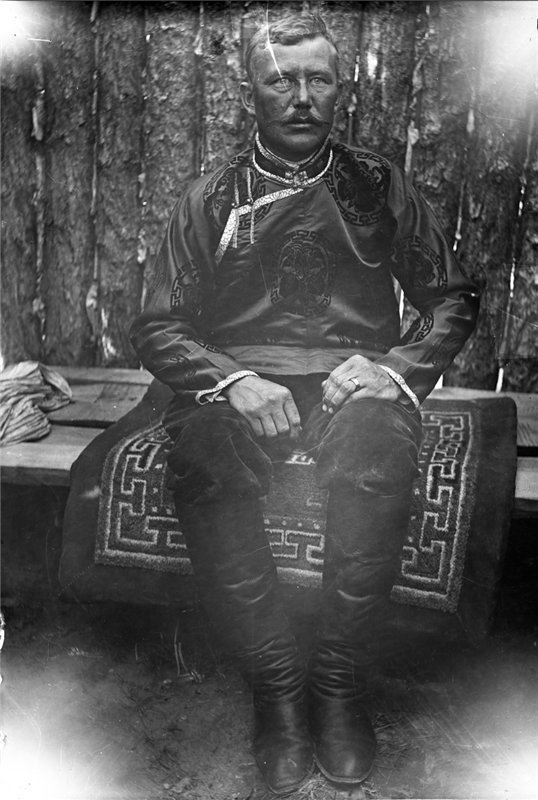
- Born: March 6, 1886
- Died: August 16, 1921; Bogd Khanate of Mongolia
- Military career
- Allegiance: Russian Empire; Bogd Khanate of Mongolia
- Branch: Imperial Russian Army (Russia) White movement
- Conflicts: World War I Russian Civil War Mongolian Revolution of 1921; Soviet intervention of Mongolia †

Boris Petrovich Rezukhin (Russian: Борис Петрович Резухин; March 6, 1886—August 16, 1921) was a Russian officer, participant in World War I and the Russian Civil War, and major-general (from 1920). He fought for the White movement in Mongolia and Transbaikal.

== Biography ==
He was born on March 6, 1886, the son of a Stabskapitän. He graduated from the Yaroslavl Cadet Corps and the Yelisavetgrad Cavalry School.

In 1907 he became a khorunzhy of the 1st Argun Regiment of the Transbaikal Host. In 1911 he was promoted to sotnik. During World War I he commanded the 1st Verkhneudinsk Regiment, and in 1915 was promoted to podyesaul.

After the Civil War began, he joined Ataman Grigory Semyonov. He commanded the Tatar Regiment and the 2nd Cavalry Brigade of Roman von Ungern-Sternberg's Asiatic Cavalry Division, as well as being its deputy commander. Following the Asiatic Cavalry's February 1921 liberation of Urga from Republican Chinese forces, the Bogd Khan of Mongolia awarded him the title of "qinwang" (Chinese: 親王; lit. 'beloved prince'). On July 8, 1921, he and Ungern-Sternberg led an attack on Ulan-Ude. However, they were defeated, and Rezukhin was killed by his own soldiers on August 16, 1921, after he refused to retreat to Manchuria with the rest of the division.
