= Tiflis Geographical Society =

Russian geographic society

Tiflis Geographical Society was a geographical society in Russia during the late 19th and early 20th centuries. It was associated with progressive and liberal causes. Although it was originally organized in Tbilisi, Russia, it became commonly known in English-speaking circles as the "Tiflis Geographical Society."

== Activity ==
General Zelensy, in an 1885 address to the society, mentioned and elaborated on the first railway established to Ashgabat.

Theodor Leonhard Rudolph Freiherr von Ungern-Sternberg, the father of anti-Communist general Roman von Ungern-Sternberg, collaborated with the society. After his expedition to Mount Elbrus, he wrote to them: "At the last height we passed through a terrific snowstorm. Breathing was not attended with any great difficulty. The health of my men has been good."

In 1913, anarchist Peter Kropotkin noted that the society's efforts in the liberation of slaves in the Caucasus were exceptional and impressive.

In 1927, the society was listed as a reputable source of information on "A Record of Mountain Adventure and Scientific Observation."

The society's work has been reused and republished in academic circles as recently as 1985, particularly regarding its studies on family life in Syria.
