= Iron Storm (2002 video game) =

- Developers: 4X Studio (original); Rebellion Developments (PS2); Reef Interactive (remake)
- Publishers: Windows; EU: Wanadoo Edition; NA: Dreamcatcher Interactive World War Zero; PlayStation 2; EU: Ubisoft Windows; EU: Reef Interactive
- Platforms: Microsoft Windows; PlayStation 2
- Release: Windows; NA: 21 October 2002; EU: 25 October 2002 World War Zero; PlayStation 2; EU: 6 August 2004 Windows; EU: 14 October 2005
- Genre: First-person shooter
- Modes: Single-player; multiplayer

Iron Storm is a first-person shooter video game developed by 4X Studio and released for Microsoft Windows in October 2002. An updated version of the game called World War Zero was later released for the PlayStation 2 and Windows in 2004 and 2005 respectively. An Xbox version was also planned but never released. Set in an alternate history in which World War I never ended, the game takes place in 1964, the 50th year of the war, and focuses on an Allied soldier's mission to stop the Russo-Mongolian Empire from developing nuclear weapons and his later efforts to end the war.

== Gameplay ==
Gameplay in Iron Storm

Iron Storm displays a mix between World War I siege tactics, such as trench warfare and the use of mustard gas, and some World War II-style weapons such as machine guns, mortars, tanks, and rocket launchers of that era, as well as more contemporary technology such as helicopters, wireless communication, spy satellites, anti-personnel mines, and unmanned turrets.

The player character cannot take much damage before dying, and there are many enemies equipped with powerful weapons such as sniper rifles or anti-tank rifles. Several in-game glitches and vague mission objectives could often force players to replay one level multiple times before finally succeeding. Enemies also behave erratically, as seen when several attempt to walk through walls, or when the player shoots a particular enemy multiple times and yet the enemy remains unscathed.

== Setting ==
The game is set in an alternate year of 1964, in which World War I never ended. The Baron Nikolai Alexsandrovich von Ugenberg seized Mongolia in 1921 in an uprising following the Russian Revolution, and later invaded Russia itself to crush the Bolsheviks. His plan was to establish a Russo-Mongolian Empire stretching from the Pacific Ocean to the Atlantic. With the help of the United States, the Allied nations of Europe were reformed as the United States of Western Europe, or the Alliance, in 1933 to counter Ugenberg's plan.

Instead of the Great War ending in 1918, it was continued for almost half a century, with the battlelines drawn down Europe's center in 1929 shifting little for either side for the next several decades. As the USWE could no longer independently contribute to the war, the Alliance army was introduced into the American stock market, allowing private investors to speculate on the lives of the soldiers who carried on the war. The outcome of the war now depended almost entirely on the economy of the Alliance's member nations.

The player takes on the role as U.S. Army Lieutenant James Anderson, only 19 when he joined the Alliance in 1943, and now a legend among the soldiers in the field. Anderson is recruited for a possibly suicidal mission: to breach enemy defenses and stop the Russo-Mongolians from developing a deadly weapon that could devastate the world. Captain Cecile Newcastle of the Royal Highlands Regiment is Anderson's immediate supervisor and is responsible for guiding him through his mission. Colonel Mitchell is the commander of the operation, but has an ulterior motive for wanting the mission to succeed.

== World War Zero ==
Iron Storm was re-released in 2004 in the UK market for the PlayStation 2 console under the name World War Zero: Iron Storm. While few things were added to the actual gameplay, the graphics were updated and many bugs from the PC version were fixed, and some new weapons were introduced, such as the flamethrower and the minigun. The PlayStation 2 version of Iron Storm was then ported back to the PC in 2005 as World War Zero and published by Reef Entertainment. This version of the game was released only in the UK and Russia. The additions in this third version consisted of support for anti-aliasing and anisotropic filtering, new save points, support for widescreen displays, and bloom lighting. Multiplayer modes were completely cut out along with the majority of the cutscenes, the quick-save feature, and third-person mode. Support for the native resolution of 17" and 19" TFT screens (1280x1024) was also dropped. The levels were reworked and simplified, and character models were also improved.

== Reception ==
Reception

Aggregate score
Aggregator	Score
Metacritic	69/100

Review scores
Publication	Score
Computer Games Magazine	2.5/5
Computer Gaming World	2/5
Eurogamer	(PS2) 6/10
GameSpot	7/10
GameSpy	2/5
GameZone	7.2/10
IGN	8/10
Jeuxvideo.com	15/20
Joystick	7/10
PC Gamer (US)	75%

The original Iron Storm received "average" reviews according to the review aggregation website Metacritic. IGN cited impressive overall gameplay and a unique storyline, but criticized the game's many glitches, overly-linear levels, and lackluster multiplayer mode.

Eurogamer thought the PS2 version of World War Zero was unoriginal and contained elements from many other video games. It was still regarded as a fun game, however, and the multiplayer element was said to be "highly commendable", though reminiscent of Red Faction II.

== Sequels ==
The first-person shooter Bet On Soldier: Blood Sport has been described as a spiritual sequel to Iron Storm by the game's developers. Many of the people who worked on Bet on Soldier had previously worked on Iron Storm. Although it is never explicitly stated that the two games take place in the same fictional universe, they share many of the same themes and plot elements, and even similar character and weapon designs. Also Bet on Soldier takes place in 1998, making it an alternate history, and it is never described how the world of Bet on Soldier came about in the game except that the world had been at war for eighty years.

Concept art from 2003 indicates that Iron Storm 2 was originally planned to be released. It depicts four levels: the Paris Gun – a super railway gun next to a military train station, a European stock exchange hub, a broken tanker in Alaska next to a base, and a heavily guarded Alaskan oil pipeline.
