= Men Bingyue =

Chinese general (1891-1944)

Men Bingyue (traditional Chinese: 門炳岳; simplified Chinese: 门炳岳; pinyin: Mén Bǐngyuè; Wade–Giles: Men Ping-yueh; 24 June 1891 - 12 August 1944) was a general in the Chinese National Revolutionary Army during the Second Sino-Japanese War.

== Biography ==
Men was born in Dongguang County, Hebei. He graduated the Baoding Military Academy in 1914. He commanded a cavalry division in the Battle of Urga. He served the Beiyang government before joining the National Revolutionary Army.

As commander of the 7th Cavalry Division he participated in the Suiyuan campaign in 1936, defeating the Japanese backed Inner Mongolian Army. After the beginning of the Second Sino-Japanese War in 1937 he was made Commander of the 6th Cavalry Army, fighting in the Battle of Taiyuan defending Suiyuan. In 1940 he was made Deputy Commander in Chief of the 17th Army Group. In 1941, he was made commander of the 7th Cavalry Army.

In 1944, Men went to India as a Chinese military representative in a joint strategic meeting between China, the United Kingdom, the United States and the Soviet Union. On 12 August 1944, he died of a heatstroke while travelling back to Bishan, Chongqing.
