= Bet On Soldier: Blood Sport =

2005 video game

- Developer: Kylotonn
- Publishers: GER: Frogster Interactive; FRA: Focus Home Interactive; NA/UK: Digital Jesters
- Designer: Clément Beurais
- Platform: Windows
- Release: GER: 25 August 2005; FRA: 14 September 2005; NA: 26 September 2005; UK: 30 September 2005
- Genre: First-person shooter
- Modes: Single-player, multiplayer

Bet On Soldier: Blood Sport is a first-person shooter video game developed by French developer Kylotonn and published in the North American and UK market by Digital Jesters. The story revolves around an unknown world war where elite soldiers meet each other in a battle to the death in one-on-one deathmatches. These deathmatches are broadcast all over the world as a televised sport named "Bet On Soldier" and since has become the favorite form of entertainment with many viewers betting on soldiers.

The game is billed as a spiritual sequel to the alternate history first-person shooter Iron Storm and heavily relies on assets recycled from the cancelled sequel. As a result, although it is not explicitly stated that the games take place in the same fictional universe, they share many of the same themes, plot elements, character and level designs, weapons, and even insignia of the fictional west European union.

== Setting ==
Bet On Soldier is set on an alternate Earth in the year 1998, during a war that has lasted for 80 years and shows no signs of ever stopping. Every aspect of society revolves around warfare. Everyone earns their income through war; all men are paid soldiers, and women and the elderly work in the weapons manufacturing industry. The world is in a perpetual state of war between two competing power blocs: from the West, the Western Republic Federation (WRF), and from Asia, the United Asian Nations (UAN). The populace seeks solace from this grim world mainly through escapist television entertainment, with the most popular programming being "Bet On Soldier", in which elite soldiers face off against each other in one-on-one deathmatches, and where viewers can wager on the outcome of the fights.

== Gameplay ==
Bet On Soldier differs from traditional first-person shooters as the player must select equipment before entering combat (much like Counter-Strike) and will be using that equipment throughout the mission. The player cannot change their inventory during a mission, or pick up weapons or ammo that either allies or enemies have dropped. In order to acquire more ammo or replenish their supply of armor, the player must spend money at various "purchase terminals" located throughout the levels. Money is earned by killing enemies, with more spectacular kills (i.e. headshots or deaths caused by exploding barrels) earning more cash.

The player can also hire up to two A.I.-controlled mercenaries that follow them throughout the level and assist them in combat. These mercenaries can be issued basic orders, such as to wait at a certain location or to follow the player.

At certain points in each level, the player is pitted in a one-on-one deathmatch against an enemy B.O.S. champion. The amount of money the player earns from these fights depends on how quickly they can kill their opponent.

== Plot ==
=== Story ===
The player assumes the role of Nolan Daneworth, a WRF soldier, who is suffering from amnesia. Following the unknown injury that caused it, Nolan decides to retire from the war and settle down as a farmer. He marries a nurse named Julianne, however, his world is turned upside down when three men come to his farmhouse and burn it down, killing Julianne. Although he doesn't recognize their leader, the two other men turn out to be B.O.S. champions; the Boryenka brothers, Mika (younger) and Igor (older), who are the highest-ranking soldiers in the league. Daneworth re-enlists in the WRF, and enters the B.O.S. tournament in order to confront the Boryenka brothers and exact his revenge.

Midway through the game, Daneworth is captured by a group called the Resistance, led by Hang Shaiming. The Resistance claims that the entire war is controlled by a secret organization known as the Syndicate, a military-industrial complex that controls the weapons manufacturing and distribution for both the WRF and the UAN, and thus continuously profits from the perpetual war. The Syndicate uses the media to maintain its control over the world, encouraging jingoism and war-mongering through the news, while satisfying the populace's need for spectacle with programs like Bet On Soldier.

Shaiming claims that Daneworth was a soldier for the Syndicate prior to his amnesia, and was tasked with hunting down Shaiming and the Resistance. However, Daneworth doesn't believe Shaiming, stating that the Syndicate is a hoax. Shaiming lets Daneworth go, but gives him a transmitter to call for the Resistance's help if he ever needs it.

Daneworth fights through several battlefields across the globe and kills several B.O.S. champions, finally making his way to the very top of the league and a final confrontation with Igor Boryenka. Daneworth defeats Boryenka, and interrogates him for information.

Boryenka confirms that the Syndicate exists, and that they ordered the attack on Daneworth's farmhouse, in the hopes of shaking Daneworth out of his amnesia. Before Boryenka can reveal more, Syndicate soldiers arrive on the scene and capture them both. Daneworth is brought before the leader of the Syndicate, Vincente Adriano, whose right-hand man, Max Balding, is revealed as the man who led the attack on Daneworth's farm and killed Daneworth's wife.

Daneworth lost his memories after an attack by the Resistance, and the Syndicate wants those memories restored because Daneworth is the only person who knows the location of the Resistance's secret base. Vincente also reveals that Daneworth's wife, Julianne, wasn't actually killed, and is still alive and in Syndicate custody. Daneworth is given a choice: either reveal the location of the Resistance headquarters and help the Syndicate destroy it, or Julia will be killed for real, and Daneworth will die on national television.

At this point, the player is given the choice of either siding with the Resistance, or the Syndicate.

If the player sides with the Resistance, Daneworth activates his secret transmitter, and he and Julianne are rescued by Hang Shaiming and the Resistance, and taken to the Resistance's secret HQ at a remote monastery in Tibet. However, the Syndicate somehow learns the location of the HQ and attacks. In the fight, Hang Shaiming is killed by Max Balding. Daneworth fights and kills Max Balding.

If the player sides with the Syndicate, Daneworth leads a Syndicate strike force against the Resistance HQ. Daneworth kills Hang Shaiming, but Max Balding arrives and states that he has been ordered to dispose of Daneworth, who has outlived his usefulness. Daneworth fights and kills Max Balding.

Regardless of the player's choice, the ending is the same. Julianne appears and reveals that she was a Syndicate operative all the time. Her mission was to get close to Daneworth and try to shake him out of his amnesia. When that failed, she and Max Balding faked her own death in the hopes that Daneworth's quest for revenge would lead him to the Resistance. With the Resistance destroyed, Daneworth has outlived his usefulness. Julianne aims her gun at an injured Daneworth, the screen goes black, and a gunshot is heard.

The game ends with the following quotation:

"An eye for an eye leaves the whole world blind" – Mahatma Gandhi

== Reception ==
Reception

Aggregate score
Aggregator	Score
Metacritic	56/100

Review scores
Publication	Score
Computer Games Magazine	1.5/5
Edge	3/10
Eurogamer	5/10
GamePro	3.5/5
GameSpot	3.1/10
IGN	7/10
PALGN	3.5/10
PC Format	67%
PC Gamer (US)	50%
X-Play	3/5

The game received "mixed" reviews according to the review aggregation website Metacritic.

== Expansions ==
Digital Jesters went into bankruptcy shortly after publishing Bet On Soldier. The series did enjoy some success in the European market, however, and two expansion packs have been released for the French, German and Polish markets. These expansion packs, Blood of Sahara and Black-out Saigon, are prequels to the main Bet On Soldier story and follow the activities of Max Balding and Hang Shaiming respectively, two of the original game's secondary characters.
