= Asiatic Cavalry Division =

White Army cavalry division during the Russian Civil War

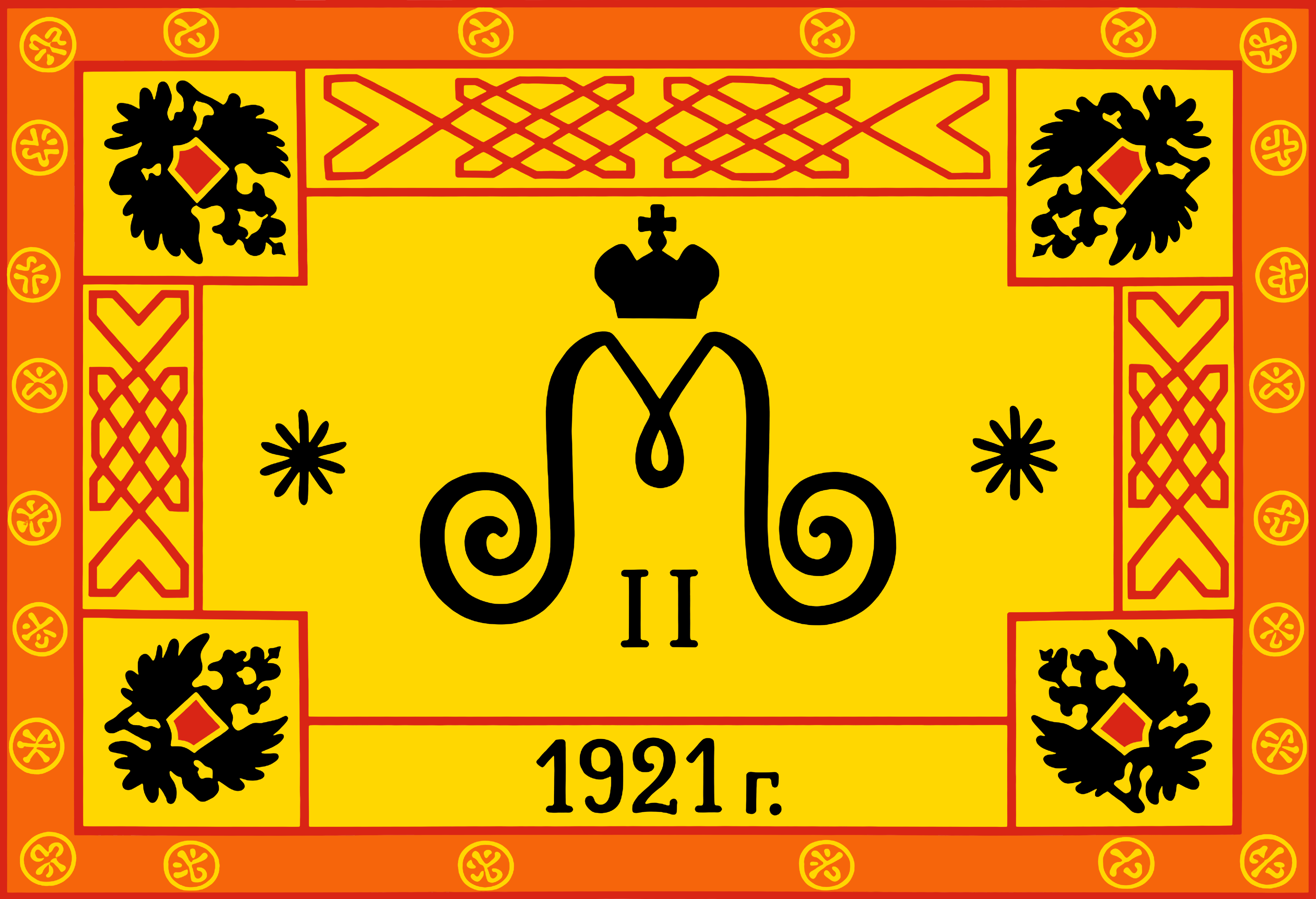
- Active: 28 May 1919 – August 1921
- Country: White Russia (until 29 September 1920); Bogd Khanate of Mongolia (after 29 September 1920)
- Size: 8,000 (May 1919); 900 (Oct. 1920); 3,500 (June 1921)
- Engagements: Russian Civil War: Soviet intervention in Mongolia; Mongolian Revolution of 1921; Occupation of Mongolia: Battle of Urga; Battles of Choir and Zamyn-Üüd

Commanders
- Notable commanders: Roman von Ungern-Sternberg; Grigory Semyonov

The Asiatic Cavalry Division (Russian: Азиатская конная дивизия, romanized: Aziatskaya konnaya diviziya) was a White Army cavalry division during the Russian Civil War. The division was composed of Buryats, Tatars, Bashkirs, Mongols of different tribes, Chinese, Manchu, Cossacks, Polish exiles and many others.

== Formation ==
The division was formed in Transbaikal by Baron Roman von Ungern-Sternberg on 28 May 1919. It consisted of the remnants from the White Army's disbanded Native Horse Corps. It was 8,000-man strong.

== History ==
Since 18 March 1920, it was directly subordinate to the Commander-in-Chief of all the Russian Eastern Regions' armed forces, Ataman Grigory Semyonov, and from 21 May 1920, in the Far Eastern Army.

After Kolchak's defeat at the hands of the Red Army and Japan's subsequent decision to withdraw its expeditionary troops from Transbaikal, Semyonov, unable to withstand the pressure of Bolshevik forces, planned a retreat to Manchuria.

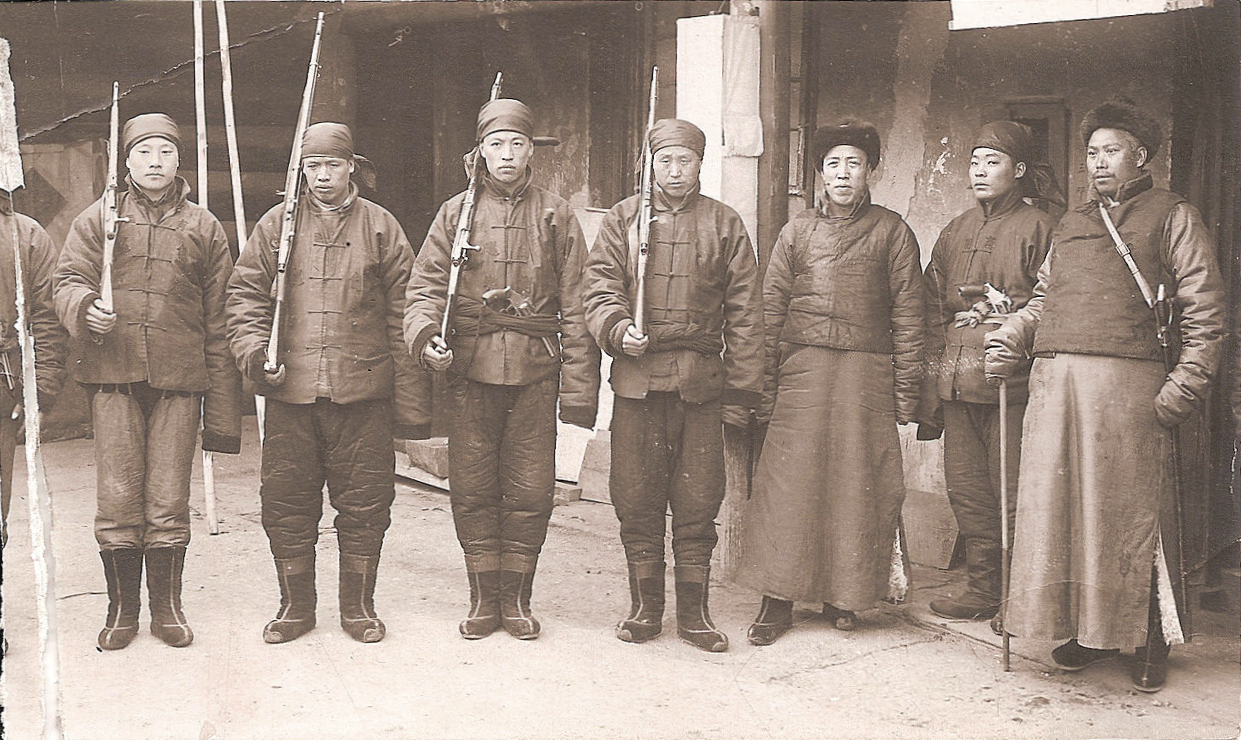
Soldiers of the Buryat-Mongolian Regiment of the Asian Cavalry Division

Ungern, however, saw it as an opportunity to implement his monarchist plan. On 7 August 1920, he broke his allegiance to Semyonov and transformed his Asiatic Cavalry Division into a guerrilla detachment. Later that same month, the unit crossed the Mongolia–Russia border due to the Red Army's and the Far Eastern Republic's People's Revolutionary Army's attacks. This move to Mongolia was unauthorized by Semenov. In Mongolia, the detachment united with other White Army forces, e.g. the units of Colonels N. N. Kazagrandi and A. P. Kaigorodov, in order to combat the Chinese and Red forces. On September 29, the division was excluded from Semenov's Far Eastern Army. During the evacuation of the Far Eastern Army from Transbaikal to Primorye along the CER, the division went a different route.

On 2 October 1920 the division, totalling 900 men, with its four regiments and artillery, entered Mongolia when Bogd Khan agreed to von Ungern-Sternberg's offer to liberate Mongolia from the Chinese occupiers. The division's fighting core were eight Transbaikal Cossack squadrons. The division freed the Mongolian capital Urga from the Chinese and tried twice to break through in Transbaikal, but suffered heavy losses. In June 1921, the division consisted of 3,500 men, but lost up to 66% of them in the battle of Troitskosavsky. In the final clash, von Ungern's forces numbered about 1,000 soldiers. During the retreat, outraged by their commander's cruel treatment, the officers expelled Ungern, and the division, in 2 brigades under the command of Esaul Makeev and then Colonel Ostrovsky (under the actual leadership of Colonel M.G. Tornovsky), moved to Manchuria where in August 1921 the division was disarmed.
