= Battle of Urga =

1921 battle in Urga, Mongolia

- Part of the Occupation of Mongolia
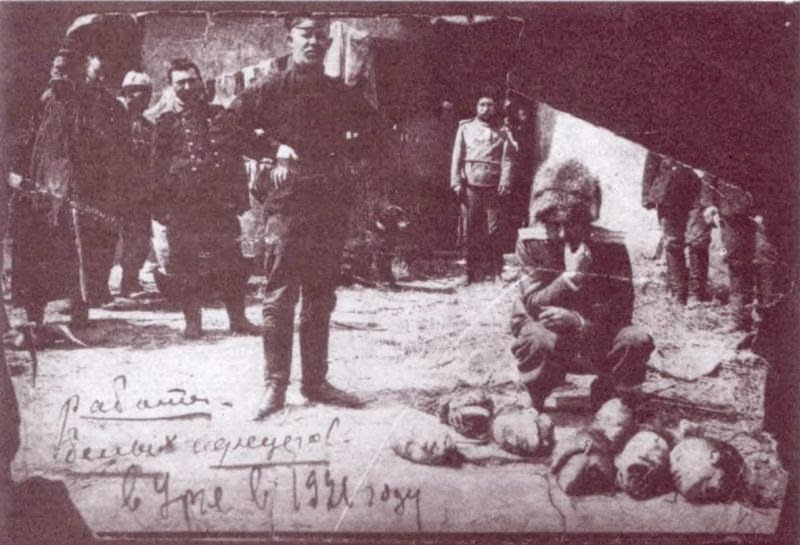
- The executed Honghuzi after the fall of the city
Date	1 – 4 February 1921
Location	Urga, Mongolia
Result	Russian victory
Territorial changes	Mongolia becomes independent

Belligerents
(Russia) White movement	Republic of China

Commanders and leaders
(Russia) Baron Ungern (Russia) Boris Rezukhin	Chu Qi Jian; Men Bingyue

Units involved
Asiatic Cavalry Division	Urga garrison

Strength
(Russia) 1,460 men 12 machine guns 4 guns	10,000 men 72 machine guns 18 guns

The Battle of Urga was a battle in the Russian civil war. During 1 to 4 February 1921, White Russian soldiers under Baron Roman von Ungern-Sternberg defeated the numerically superior Chinese garrison and subsequently liberated Mongolia from Chinese occupation.

== Background ==
In July 1919, Chinese troops under the command of General Xu Shuzheng occupied Urga, the capital of the Bogd Khanate of Mongolia, which had declared independence from China in 1911. Mongolia had officially been under Chinese control since the Kyakhta Treaty of 1915, but China had not previously been able to assert control over the territory, and Mongolia continued to act as an independent state with the Bogd Khan as its leader. In 1919, the khanate's autonomy was eliminated, the Mongolian national government was dissolved, and Bogd Khan was placed under house arrest.

In the autumn of 1920, General Ungern-Sternberg's Asiatic Cavalry Division, pressed by the Red Army, entered Mongolia from Dauria. Ungern-Sternberg, having not received a pass from the Chinese to march on Troitskosavsk, decided to immediately storm the city. The first unsuccessful assault took place between 26–27 October and 1–4 November 1920, when the Chinese garrison, seizing the initiative from the attackers and taking advantage of significant numerical superiority and better material support, managed to disperse the division that had retreated to the Tereljiin Gol River in the upper reaches of Tuul, and then to Kerulen. Ungern-Sternberg, however, did not abandon the plan to capture the capital.

== Battle ==
=== Preparing for storming ===
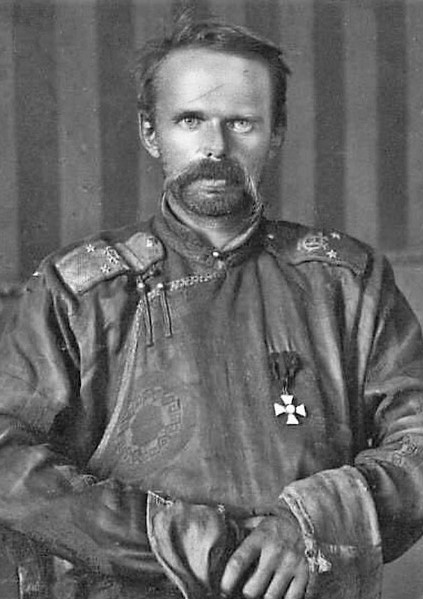
General Ungern-Sternberg 8 months after the capture of Urga

In the two months since the previous assault, the Asian Division had almost doubled (to 1,460 men) and was partially reorganized; it had 12 machine guns and 4 guns. The Mongolian population spread rumors that Ungern-Sternberg was forming a large Mongolian army of up to 5,000 people, which became known to the Chinese command, which had not carried out any fortification work during the entire occupation and could not confirm the accuracy of this information due to the lack of an established intelligence service.

For the new assault, Colonel Dubovik developed a detailed plan for the capture of the city, approved by the highest officers of the division and communicated in detail to the senior and junior command staff.

On 26 January 1921, two reconnaissance detachments of 500 and 200 men were sent to the north and southwest of Urga. They eliminated the threat of counterattacks from the rear and seized weapons, equipment and horse herds of the Chinese who did not take the fight.

On 29 January, an "important lama" arrived from the capital to Ungern-Sternberg in the U-Bulan valley (south-east of Urga), who brought him a khadak letter from the Bogd Khan with a blessing for the expulsion of the Chinese from Mongolia. The lama conveyed to Ungern-Sternberg the plan for the preliminary abduction of Bogd Khan from house arrest in his residence.

Military units	Asiatic Cavalry Division	Chinese garrison
Infantry and cavalry	1st Tatar Cavalry Regiment (yesaul Parygin) — 350 men. 2nd Cavalry Regiment (esaul Khobotov) — 300 men. Mongolian division — 180 people. Chakhar division (Found-gun) — 180 people. Separate (Buryat-Tibetan) division (Cornet Tubanov) — 170 people. Japanese cavalry company — 40 people.	3 infantry regiments of 9 companies — 4,000 people (Gen. Zhang Jinghui) Cavalry Division (General Meng Bingyue, 门炳岳) - 2,900 men.
Machine guns and cannons	Artillery Division (Captain Dmitriev) — 4 guns Machine gun crew (Captain Evfaritskiy) — 12 machine guns	3 batteries of 6 guns — 18 guns 3 machine gun companies — 72 machine guns

=== Storming of Urga ===
On the afternoon of 1 February 1921, the main forces of the division under the command of General Rezukhin reached the Madachan defile and in the evening drove the Chinese from the hill near the village of Nizhny Madachan between the Bogdo-ula and Bayanzurkh mountains. Yesaul Khobotov drove the Chinese out of the Khujir-Bulan barracks.

Early in the morning of 2 February, Lieutenant Plyasunov's hundred bypassed the Chinese battery on the southeastern slope of Bogdo-ula from the north and opened fire on them, which forced the Chinese to abandon their positions and clear the village of Bolshoy Madachan, stormed by Rezukhin. During these battles, Ungern-Sternberg's detachment, having previously destroyed the Chinese security patrols on Bogdo-ul, went along the Tuul River to the palace where Bogd Khan was under arrest, dispersed the Chinese guards, freed Bogd Khan and his wife and took them to the Manjushri monastery by the same road. The news of the abduction greatly demoralized the Chinese garrison.

On the night of 4 February, Rezukhin crossed the Tuul and, having eliminated the guards, at 5.30 a.m. he stormed the Chinese barracks located east of the city. Taking advantage of the complete unpreparedness of the Chinese to attack, Rezukhin's 900 cavalrymen completed the assault on the barracks by dawn. After that, Rezukhin headed for the Urginsky Chinatown (Maimachen), and the yesauls Khobotov and Arkhipov went to the Mongolian barracks south of the city. Having smashed the gates of the fortified quarter, Rezukhin's regiments launched an attack and defeated the three thousandth garrison of Maimachen in street battles, suffering relatively heavy losses; most of the garrison fled, and about 500 people were captured. The Chinese who remained in the city, both military and most of the civilians, fled for their lives. At 2 p.m., Ungern-Sternberg drove through the streets of Urga with a convoy, which marked the end of the assault.

The retreat of the Chinese was of a panicked nature; the highway leading from Urga to Troitskosavsk, along which the Chinese fled, was strewn with clothes, shoes and food. February 5, Gen. Rezukhin, at the head of the 1st Tatar Regiment, and Chakharov went out to pursue the deserting Chinese. The retreating troops hoped to enter Manchuria through Transbaikalia, but the Soviet government allowed only Chen Yi and his entourage to enter.

== Aftermath ==
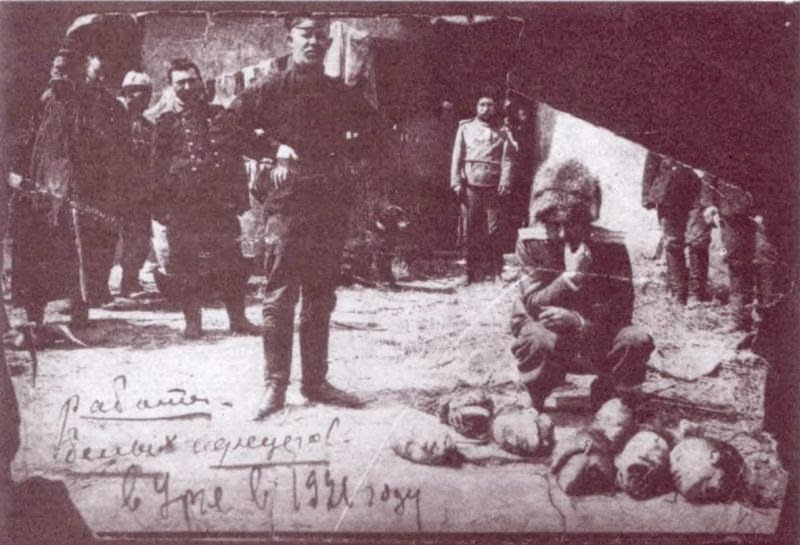
Russian soldiers after the capture of Urga

The independence of Outer Mongolia was restored; the power of Bogd Khan was restored and the Mongolian government was recreated. The actual ruler of the city was Ungern-Sternberg for some time; his subordinates organized a "purge" of the Russian colony of Urga from "Bolshevik supporters."

The Asian division was significantly replenished at the expense of the Russian colonists in Urga and captured rich trophies.: 16 guns, 60 machine guns, 5,000 rifles and 500,000 rounds of ammunition; and also received a springboard for an offensive against Red Army-occupied Buryatia. Ungern-Sternberg's personal authority among the Mongolian population had grown enormously. Bogd Khan granted Ungern-Sternberg the title of Darkhan-hoshoy-chin-wang in the degree of khan; many of the baron's subordinates received posts of Mongol princes. However, as a result, Ungern-Sternberg did not become either the dictator or the khan of Mongolia: he acted with the sanction of the monarch, did not interfere in the administration of the country; he received only a Mongolian title, but not a land allotment and the corresponding power.
