= Occupation of Mongolia =

1919–1921 Republic of China occupation of Outer Mongolia

Outer Mongolia 外蒙古 ᠭᠠᠳᠠᠭᠠᠳᠤ ᠮᠣᠩᠭᠣᠯ
- 1919–1921
- Flag Coat of arms
- Anthem: 《中華雄立宇宙間》 "China Heroically Stands in the Universe"
- Map of the Republic of China (excluding the de facto independent Tibet) and its occupation of the Outer Mongolia and Uryankhay Krai regions (shown in light green).
- Status: Military occupation by the Republic of China
- Capital: Niislel Khüree (now Ulaanbaatar)
- Common languages: Mongolian; Tuvan
- Religion: Tibetan Buddhism
- Government: Direct control from China^{a}
- Bogd Khan
- History
  - Chinese troops occupy Urga: October 1919
  - Battle of Urga: February 1921
  - Chinese troops defeated at Maimachin^{b}: March 1921
Preceded by	Succeeded by
Bogd Khanate of Mongolia; Uryankhay Krai	Bogd Khanate of Mongolia; Uryankhay Krai
- 1. Subsequently under Baron Ungern.; 2. By White Russian forces under Ungern and subsequently by Mongolian People's Party and Russian Red Army forces.

The occupation of Outer Mongolia (also known as the Chinese invasion of Mongolia) by the Beiyang government of the Republic of China after the revocation of Outer Mongolian autonomy (Chinese: 外蒙古撤治) began in October 1919 and lasted until 18 March 1921, when Chinese troops in Urga were routed by Baron Roman von Ungern-Sternberg's White Russian (Buryats, Russians etc.) and Mongolian forces. These, in turn, were defeated by the Red Army and its Mongolian allies by June 1921.

Although the Beiyang government abolished the autonomy of the Bogd Khanate in Outer Mongolia and then expanded its occupation to include Uryankhay Krai (Tuva), it was unable to consolidate its rule over both regions.

== Background ==
In December 1911, during the Xinhai Revolution, Outer Mongolia declared independence from the Qing dynasty in the Mongolian Revolution of 1911. Mongolia became a de facto absolute theocratic monarchy led by the Bogd Khan. However, the newly established Republic of China claimed inheritance of all territories held by the Qing dynasty and considered Outer Mongolia as part of its territory. This claim was provided for in the Imperial Edict of the Abdication of the Qing Emperor signed by the Empress Dowager Longyu on behalf of the six-year-old Xuantong Emperor: "the continued territorial integrity of the lands of the five races, Manchu, Han, Mongol, Hui, and Tibetan into one great Republic of China." The Provisional Constitution of the Republic of China adopted in 1912 specifically established frontier regions of the new republic, including Outer Mongolia, as integral parts of the state.

In the 1915 tripartite Kyakhta Agreement, the Russian Empire (which had strategic interests in Mongolian independence but did not want to completely alienate China), the Republic of China and the Bogd Khanate of Mongolia agreed that Outer Mongolia was autonomous under Chinese suzerainty. However, in the following years Russian influence in Asia waned due to the First World War and, later, the October Revolution. Since 1918, Outer Mongolia was threatened by the Russian Civil War, and in summer 1918 asked for Chinese military assistance, which led to the deployment of a small force to Urga. Grigory Semyonov led the Buryats and Inner Mongols in spearheading a plan to create a pan-Mongol state. Meanwhile, some Mongol aristocrats had become more and more dissatisfied with their marginalization at the hands of the theocratic Lamaist government, and, also provoked by the threat of the Outer Mongolia's independence from the pan-Mongolist movement of Grigory Semyonov in Siberia, were ready to accept Chinese rule by 1919. According to an Associated Press dispatch, some Mongol chieftains signed a petition asking China to retake administration of Mongolia and end Outer Mongolia's autonomy. Since they opposed the Bogd Khan and his clerics, Mongol nobles agreed to abolish Mongol autonomy and reunite with China under an agreement with 63 stipulations signed with Chen Yi (Chinese: 陈毅) in August–September 1919. The pan-Mongolist initiative of Grigory Semyonov led by Buryats and Inner Mongols was rejected by the Khalkha Mongol nobles of Urga, so the Khalkha nobles instead assured the Chinese under Chen Yi that they were against it. The prospect of ending Mongol autonomy and having Chinese troops stationed in Niialel Khuree, Altanbulag, Uliyasutai, and Khovd was permitted by the Mongolian government in response to the Japanese-backed Buryatia pan-Mongol movement.

An ally of the Chinese government, the Qinghai-born Monguor Gelugpa Buddhist Lama leader Sixth Janggiya Khutughtu was against the autonomy of Outer Mongolia.

== Causes ==
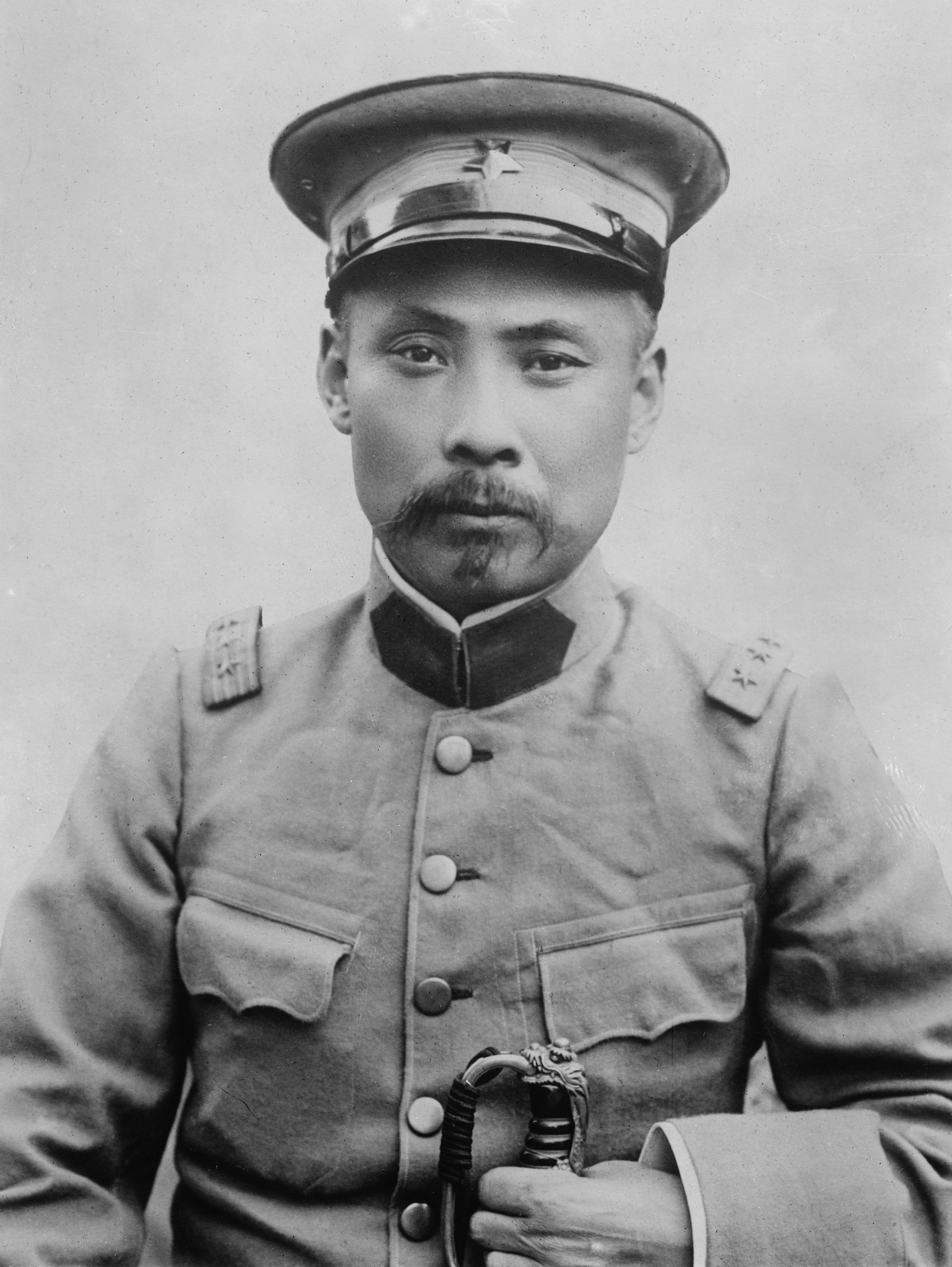
Duan Qirui

The invasion of Mongolia was the brainchild of Chinese Prime Minister Duan Qirui, who engineered China's entry into World War I. He took out several large loans from the Japanese government, including the Nishihara Loans. He used the money to create the "War Participation Army", ostensibly to battle the Central Powers. His rivals knew that the purpose of the army was really to crush internal dissent. It existed outside the Ministry of the Army and was controlled by the "War Participation Bureau", which he led, and it was staffed entirely by his Anhui clique. President Feng Guozhang, Duan's rival, had no control, despite constitutionally being commander-in-chief. When the war ended without a soldier stepping foot abroad, his critics demanded the disbanding of the War Participation Army. Duan had to find a new purpose for his army. Mongolia was chosen for several reasons:

- Duan's envoys to the 1919 Paris Peace Conference were unable to prevent the German concession in Shandong (Kiautschou Bay Leased Territory) being transferred to Japan, which caused the Chinese nationalist May Fourth Movement to target his policies. His reputation as a patriot was discredited. Reintegrating Mongolia would reverse the situation.
- The Constitutional Protection War was fought to a bloody standstill in Hunan. Using his army for another risky attempt to retake southern China from the rebels was undesirable.
- The Russian Civil War left Mongolia without a foreign protector. An easy victory would boost Duan's stature.
- The longstanding Prime Minister of Mongolia, Tögs-Ochiryn Namnansüren, died in April 1919 and left the country's ruling elite deeply divided over a successor. Other Mongolian elites, such as Sodnomravdan, Gombosüren, Chagdarjav, Gonchigsüren, Dashnyam and Handdorj had also died of unknown causes.

== Invasion ==
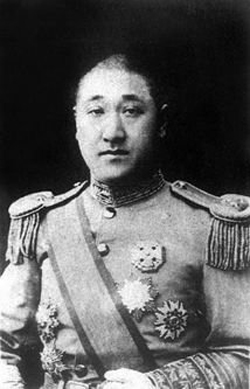
Xu Shuzheng

The pro-Japanese Anhui clique leader Xu Shuzheng led the military occupation of Mongolia in violation of Chen Yi's agreement signed with the Mongol nobles because he wanted to use Mongolia as his own fief. Anhui clique was also known as Anfu group. Some authors believe that the Anfu Club was bribed by Japan to implement in Mongolia the strategies of Japan.

The War Participation Army was renamed the Northwestern Frontier Army. Duan gave control of it to his right-hand man, Xu Shuzheng, a member of the pro-Japanese Anhui clique in the Chinese government. They announced that the expedition was at the invitation of several Mongolian princes to protect Mongolia from Bolshevik incursions. It was supposed to begin in July 1919, but the train broke down. In October, Xu led a spearhead group of 4,000 that quickly captured Niĭslel Khüree without resistance. Another 10,000 troops followed to occupy the rest of the country. The successful invasion was met with acclaim throughout China, even by Duan's rival Sun Yat-sen leader of the southern government, although Sun's telegram could be interpreted sarcastically. It is supposed that the Japanese were the ones who ordered the pro-Japanese Chinese warlords to occupy Mongolia to halt a possibly revolutionary spillover from the Russian revolutionaries into Mongolia and Northern China; after the Chinese had completed the occupation, the Japanese abandoned them and left them on their own. This data is not confirmed by archival documents, though, which indicate that the occupation of Outer Mongolia was an initiative of the Anhui-led Chinese government caused by the weakening of Russia by the Russian Revolution and civil war. Manlaibaatar Damdinsüren said that, "I can defend Mongolia from China and Red Russia."

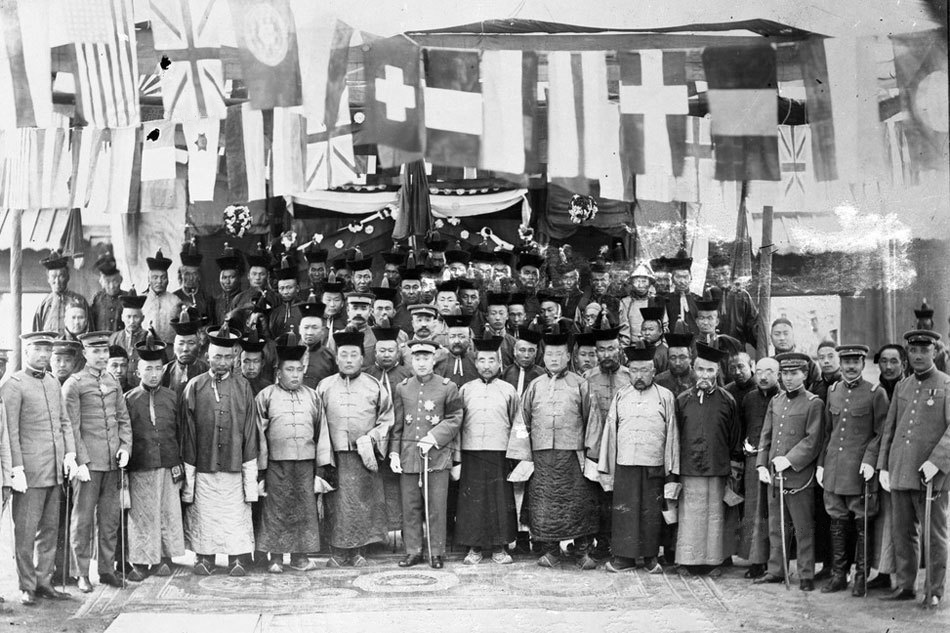
Xu Shuzheng and Mongolian Noyons in Khüree

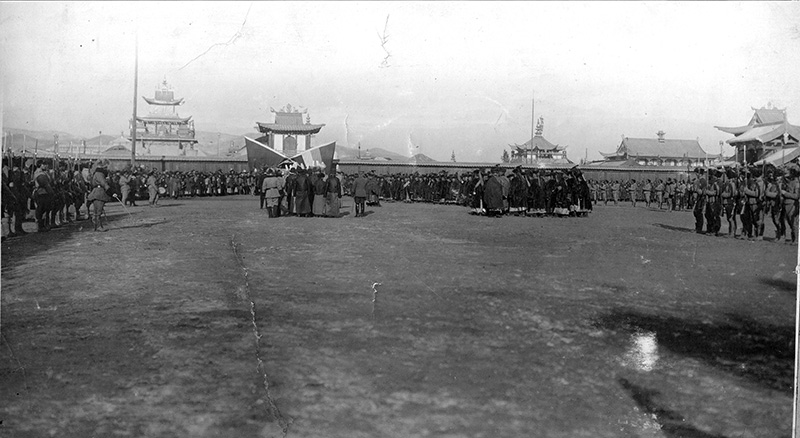
Ceremony of the destruction of Mongolia's autonomy in 1920, in front of the Yellow Palace

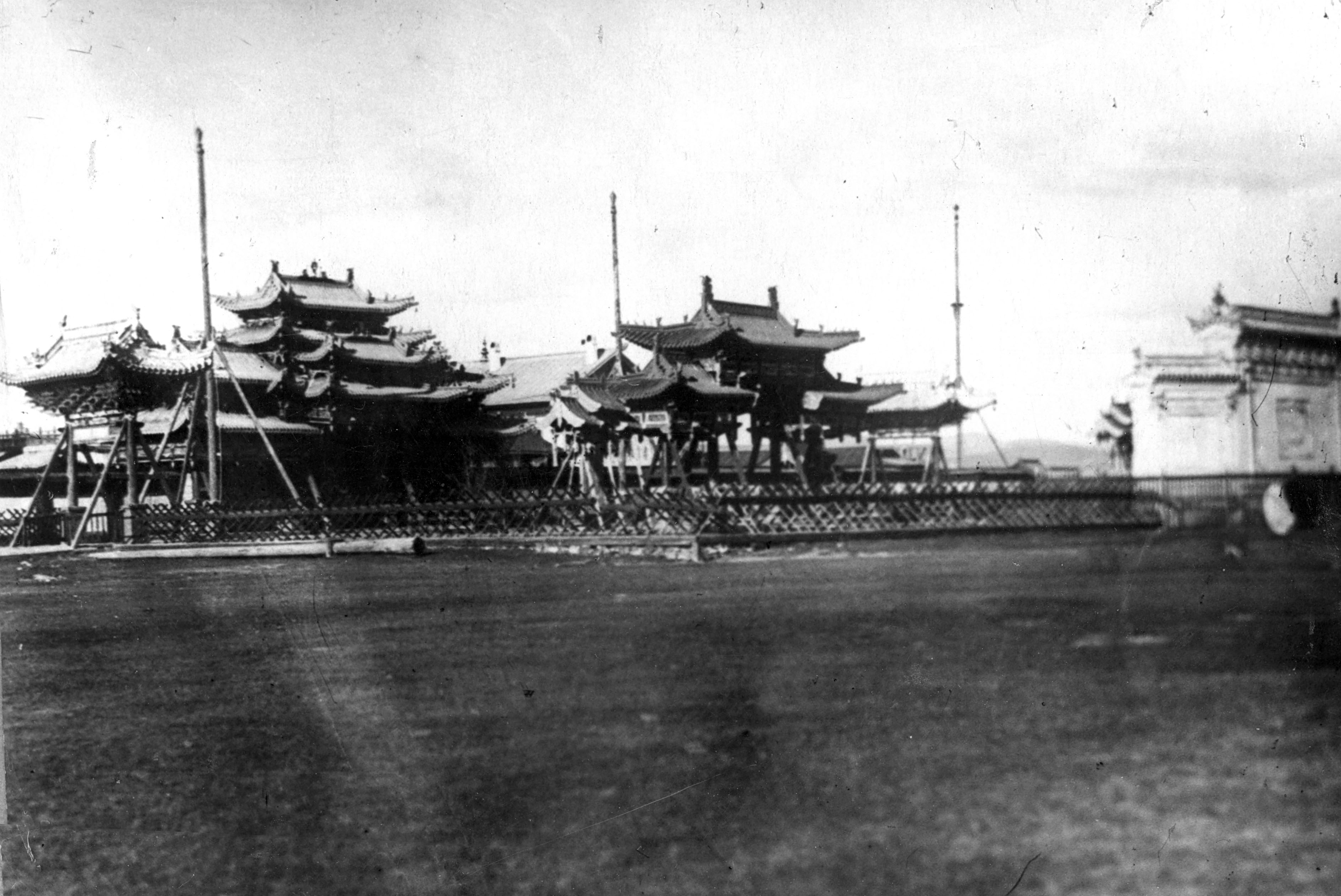
Green Palace in 1920s

In 1919, the Mongolian Council of Khans was addressed to by Xu Shuzheng in a condescending speech. In February 1920, Xu presided over a very humiliating ceremony in which the Bogd Khan and other leaders were forced to kowtow before him and the Five Races Under One Union flag. That event marked the beginning of active resistance against Chinese rule, which coalesced into the Mongolian People's Party.

Domestic politics in China soon changed the situation dramatically. The invasion had caused alarm for Zhang Zuolin, the powerful warlord of Manchuria, who was upset that such a large army was moved so close to his territory. He joined the chorus of critics such as Cao Kun and Wu Peifu calling for the removal of the Anhui clique. In July, they forced President Xu Shichang to remove Xu Shuzheng from his position. In response, Xu Shuzheng moved the bulk of his forces to confront his enemies in China. Both he and Duan Qirui were defeated in the ensuing Zhili–Anhui War. That left only a few Chinese troops in Mongolia without their leadership.

Many of the Chinese troops during the occupation were Tsahar (Chahar) Mongols from Inner Mongolia, which was a major cause for animosity between Outer Mongols (Khalkhas) and Inner Mongols. But the main animosity was directed to Chinese soldiers who were not suitably paid by the Chinese Government. This led to profound looting and murdering of Mongols by Chinese troops in Urga and elsewhere.

The Tüsheet Khan Aimag's Prince, Daichin Chin Wang, was a supporter of Chinese rule, but his younger brother Tsewang was a supporter of Ungern.

The Chinese sent a honghuzi-led band of Chahar Inner Mongols to fight against the Outer Mongols, but the Tushegoun Lama killed them. Both the Chinese army and Ungern's force contained Chahar Inner Mongol soldiers, who participating in kidnapping local Outer Mongol women in addition to looting and mutilating the Outer Mongols. The plundering Inner Mongol Chahars were recruited by the Chinese High Commissioner Wu Tsin Lao with the deliberate knowledge that they would engage in looting. Deserters, including Russians, from Ungern's forces were punished or killed by the Chahar Inner Mongols in Ungern's army. The Soviet Red Army crushed the Chahar Mongol unit of Ungern's forces.

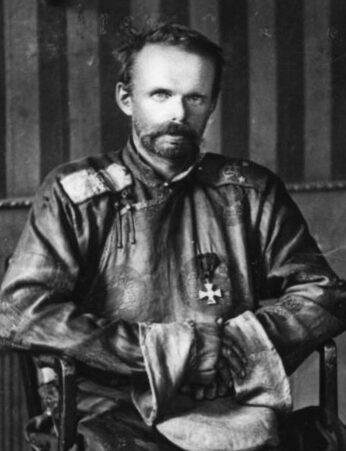
Roman von Ungern-Sternberg

In October, the White Russian Baron Roman von Ungern-Sternberg swept into Mongolia from the north, fought many battles against the Chinese garrison stationed in Urga, and captured it in February 1921. There, he defeated the Chinese forces and restored Bogd Khan as monarch. Around the same time, the MPP engaged in its first battle against Chinese troops. After the defeat of the Chinese army, 2000 Chinese petitioned the Living Buddha to enlist in his legions. They were accepted and formed into two regiments, which wore as insignia the old Chinese silver dragons.

The reconquest of Outer Mongolia was assigned to Zhang Zuolin. A joint MPP-Red Army expedition led by Soviet Red commanders and Damdin Sükhbaatar defeated Ungern in August. One of Soviet regiments against Ungern was led by Konstantin Konstantinovich Rokossovsky. Tensions leading up to the First Zhili–Fengtian War and the apparent victory of the Bolsheviks in the Russian Civil War led to the end of China's involvement. Reincarnations, abbots and lamas were imprisoned or executed by the Mongolian People's Party led by the Soviet Bolsheviks. China rejected the Soviet intervention.

The Transbaikalia Cossack Ataman was Semyonov. A Mongol–Buryat republic was declared in January 1919 by Semyonov. A "Buryat National Department" was created by Semyonov and the Buryat elite like intelligentsia, lamas and noyons and summoned by Semyonov and the Japanese in February 1919. The aim was to unite Buryatia, Tuva, Outer Mongolia, and Inner Mongolia into one Mongol state, discussed at the February 1919 Chita "Pan-Mongol" congress led by Semyonov's Transbaikal Buryats. A "Provisional Government" was set up after the February 1919 meeting. Russian officered Chahars and other Mongols served in Semyonov 's army. Inner Mongols made up a division. There were Chahars, Tungus, Buryats, Tatars, Bashkirs, and others in the army. The Inner Mongols numbered around 2,000 and were placed in the "Wild Division" of OMO, led by General Levitskii. The White Army cavalry of Semyonov drafted 1,800 Buryats while Buryats were also recruited by the Bolsheviks. In Trans-Baikalia, Semyonov was joined by Kappel, who commanded Aleksandr Vasil'evich Kolchak's rearguard. Semyonov and Kolchak were allied. From 1916 to 1919, the Buryats were subjected to Japanese propaganda. The Paris Peace Conference was attended by representatives from the "Dauria Government" of the pan-Mongol initiative established in February 1919 by Semyonov.

Fushenge led the Bargut and Karachen (Karachin) Mongol soldiers and entrusted the training of them to Ungern. The Pan Mongolist Inner Mongolian commander Fushenge was participating in the Pan-Mongol conference with Ungern when they sent representatives to Versailles, but Ungern developed a distaste for the idea of the pan-Mongolian movement due to participation of the Buryat national democrats, and he was not participated in this movement. The Bogd Khan rejected the idea of a pan-Mongol state since he did not want to lose his power to the Japanese and Semenov. Since did not want to provoke China, he rejected a delegation from Dauria in which Fushenge participated. Ungern's Russian officers in Dauria were drilling the Inner Mongol soldiers of Fushenge and Buriat soldiers, but hostility was developing between the Inner Mongols and the Buriats. Fushenge and his soldiers wanted to kill buryats and return to Inner Mongolia. The plot was uncovered, and in a short fight Fushenge and most of conspirators were killed by Russian soldiers.

== Aftermath ==
After the Asiatic Cavalry Division drove out the Chinese troops occupying Urga, Mongolia had regained its independence in February 1921. The Chinese Army and the Soviet Red Army defeated the rest of the White Russians like Kazagrandi and Suharev as they fled and abandoned Ungern. The Chinese Army in June 1921 defeated a 350 strong White Russian unit, led by Colonel Kazagrandi, most of whom died in battle although 42 became prisoners.

With the support of the Bolsheviks, Mongolian revolutionaries successively eliminated the Russian White Army and the Chinese Army in Outer Mongolia and a new people's government was established. After a brief period of constitutional monarchy, the Mongolian People's Republic was established in 1924 and would last until 1992.

It was proposed for Zhang Zuolin's domain (the Chinese "Three Eastern Provinces") to take Outer Mongolia under its administration by the Bogd Khan and Bodoo in 1922 after pro-Soviet Mongolian Communists seized control of Outer Mongolia.

For China, the occupation indirectly led to the permanent breakup of the Beiyang Army and the fall of strongman Duan Qirui. That marked the period of high warlordism, as the former officers of Yuan Shikai battled one another for many years to come. Many White Russian guerrillas became mercenaries in China after the occupation. Along with the Siberian Intervention, that was the only foreign military expedition carried out by the Beiyang government. The Republic of China that ruled mainland China at the time claimed Mongolia as part of its territory until 1946. The Nationalist government of China officially recognized the independence of Mongolia in January 1946 after the 1945 Mongolian independence referendum which voted for independence, but the Kuomintang government in Taiwan retracted its recognition of Mongolian independence in 1953 over Soviet assistance of the Communists in the Chinese Civil War.

In 2002, the Government of the Republic of China announced that it now recognized Mongolia as an independent country again, excluding Mongolia from the official maps of the Republic of China and requiring Mongolian citizens visiting Taiwan to produce passports. Informal relations were established between Mongolia and Taiwan via trade offices in Ulaanbaatar and Taipei but without formal diplomatic recognition. The One-China policy makes Mongolia recognize only the People's Republic of China. In 2012, the Mainland Affairs Council issued a statement saying that "Mongolia (formerly known as Outer Mongolia in Taiwan) has never been part of its constitutionally claimed territory."

Many Buryats had served in Ungern's army and with Stalin's ensuing persecutions, Mongolia became a refuge for many fleeing Buryats. The Soviets divided the Mongols away from the Tuvan and the Buryat peoples, though they had been separate during the preceding Russian Empire and the time of the Uryankhay Republic. During Soviet rule, Bolshevik officials conducted an anti-Buddhist campaign in Buryatia, executing many in a cultural and intelligentsia purge. The Soviets faced opposition in their anti-religious campaign from Buryat clerics. Mongol nationalism in Transbaikalia and Buryatia was equated with Grigory Semenov by the Mongolian communists and the Soviets. The Buryat-Mongolia Communist Party First Secretary Verbanov was executed in Stalin's purge. Buryatia and Tuva are today part of the Russian Federation, with ethnic Russians making up most of Buryatia's population since the turn of the 20th century.

== See also ==
- List of states and regions involved in the Russian Civil War
- Bibliography of the Russian Revolution and Civil War
- Outline of the Russian Revolution and Civil War
- Bogd Khanate of Mongolia
- State of Buryat-Mongolia
- Mongolian Revolution of 1921
- Soviet intervention in Mongolia
- Tibet (1912–1951)
