= Soviet intervention in Mongolia =

Event during the Russian Civil War

- Part of the Russian Civil War and Mongolian Revolution of 1921
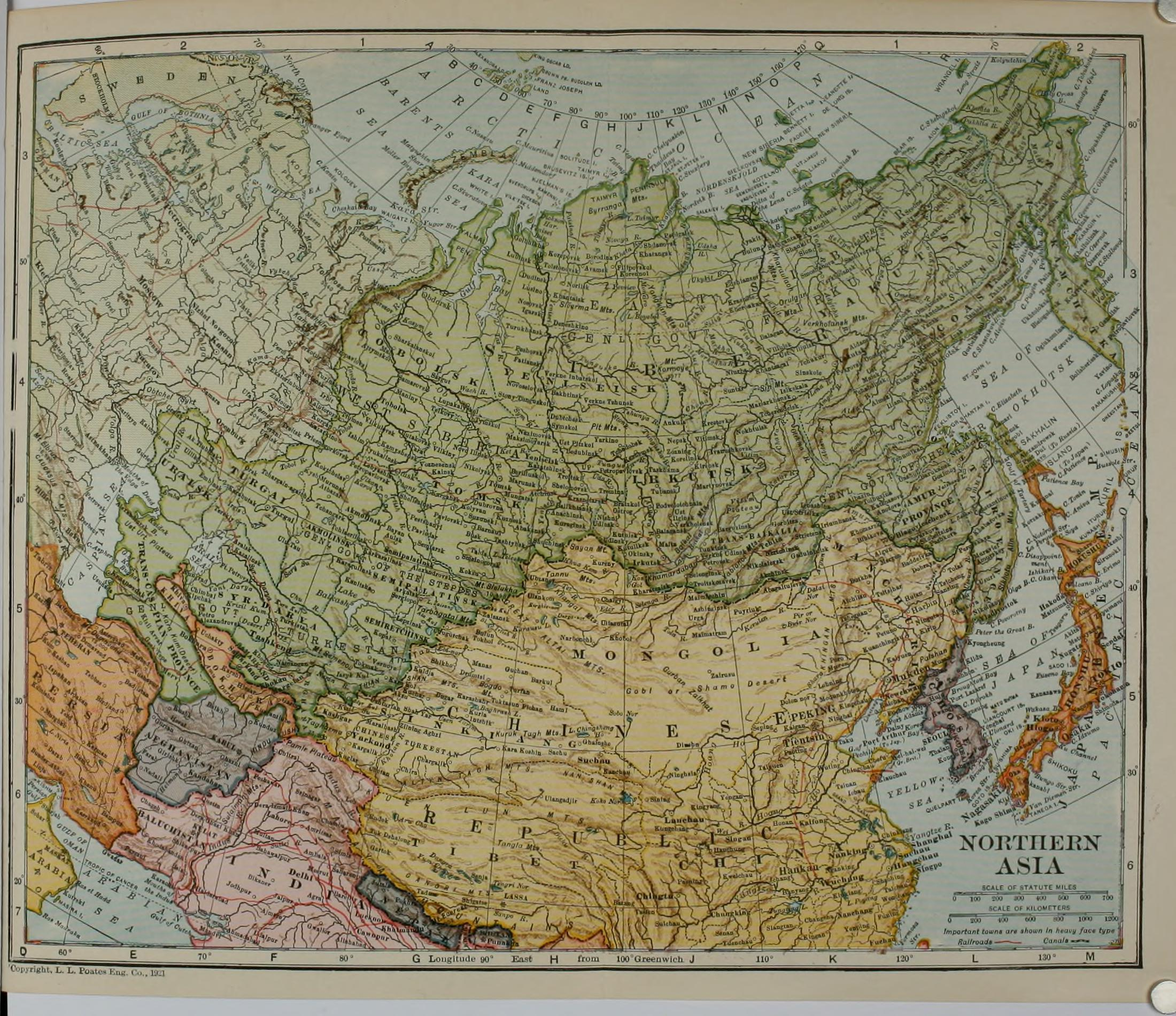
- Outer Mongolia in 1921, shown as part of the Republic of China
Date	1 May – 31 August 1921
Location	Outer Mongolia
Result	Red Army victory: Provisional Mongolian People's Government under control of the Bolsheviks

Belligerents
Russian SFSR; Mongolian People's Revolutionary Party	Mongolia

Commanders and leaders
Mikhail Matiyasevich; Konstantin Neumann; Ivan Smirnov; Damdin Sükhbaatar; Khorloogiin Choibalsan	Baron Ungern (executed); Boris Rezukhin †

Strength
7,600 bayonets 2,500 sabers	4,000 sabers

The Soviet intervention in Mongolia was when Soviet troops fought in 1921 at the request of the communist government of the Mongolian People's Party against the anti-communist government of White Russian general Baron Ungern and occupied the entirety of Mongolia. Later there was the establishment of the Mongolian People's Republic, and the formation of modern ideas of Mongolian nationalism, which fully pulled Mongolia out of the influence of the Beiyang government of China and under the influence of Soviet Russia.

== Background ==
In December 1911 during the Xinhai Revolution, Outer Mongolia declared independence from the Qing dynasty of China in the Mongolian Revolution of 1911. Mongolia became a de facto absolute theocratic monarchy led by the Bogd Khan. However, the newly established Republic of China claimed inheritance of all territories held by the Qing dynasty and considered Outer Mongolia a part of its territory. This claim was made in the Imperial Edict of the Abdication of the Qing Emperor signed by the Empress Dowager Longyu on behalf of the six-year-old Xuantong Emperor: "[...] the continued territorial integrity of the lands of the five races, Manchu, Han, Mongol, Hui, and Tibetan into one great Republic of China" ([...] 仍合滿、漢、蒙、回、藏五族完全領土，為一大中華民國). The Provisional Constitution of the Republic of China adopted in 1912 specifically established frontier regions of the new republic, including Outer Mongolia, as integral parts of the state.

The new government under the Bogd Khan tried to seek international recognition, particularly from the Russian government. The Russian tsar however, rejected the Mongolian plea for recognition, due to a common Russian Imperial ambition at the time to take over the central Asian states, and Mongolia was planned for further expansion. However, the Russian Empire could not act on the ambition due to internal struggles, so they recognised the autonomy of the region, which allowed Russia to claim that Mongolia was under her protection. The ongoing struggle of Mongolian nationalists against the Chinese continued through the First World War, until 1917 when Mongolian princes accepted Chinese control over the region.

=== Chinese and White Russian invasion ===
In 1917, the Russian Revolution began. During most of the war, Russian colonies in central Asia and along the Mongolian frontier fell under control of the White movement. As more and more of the White Movement began to move east, like the Czechoslovak Legion, Mongolia began to worry about a possible invasion by White Russian troops. The White high command did think that an invasion of Mongolia could be worthwhile. The region was largely unpopulated and had large reserves of iron and coal. These resources were vital to the White movement, especially as the western industrial bases like Moscow and Petrograd were taken by the Soviets. Within Mongolia, from October 1919 Chinese troops under command of Xu Shuzheng nullified treaties and began sending in troops to assert Chinese control over the region, under the pretext of protection from spillover from the Russian Civil War.

This led to the creation of the Mongolian People's Party as a revolutionary group fighting against the Chinese. As the Soviets began the hard push eastward against the White Russians, White high command demanded that the Chinese government do something about their struggle. After Chinese refusal of the plans, The Russian Asiatic cavalry under General Roman von Ungern-Sternberg invaded in October 1920, pushing out undersupplied Beiyang troops in February 1921, who had mostly headed south, as the first stages of the Chinese Civil War began playing out. Over the course of the three-month invasion, Sternberg pushed the Chinese out and declared Bogd Khan monarch of a once again independent Mongolia.

==== Sternberg government ====
Sternberg began an immediate concentration of power around himself. Though de jure power was held by Bogd Khan, Sternberg acted as the true head of state and began insisting that he was the saviour of the lands of Mongolia and that he would bring the Mongols to justice. Sternberg began fusing traditional Mongolian beliefs with those of strong Russian nationalism, insisting that the Bolsheviks must be stamped out, due to their Jewish nature, and that the world was falling into "mad revolution". He created grand battle strategies of a new push westward, to crush the Bolshevik movement, and tried to centre White command around himself, trying to get the disparate commanders who were attempting defence against the Bolsheviks to unite and move east. These plans, however, failed, and the White movement began losing more and more ground to the Bolsheviks.

== Soviet invasion of Mongolia ==
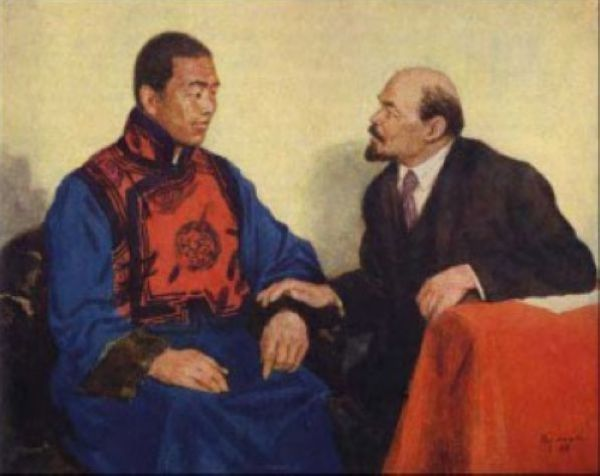
Sükhbaatar meets with Lenin, a poster of Russian Communist Party (Bolsheviks)

In May 1921, the Asian Horse Division attacked border troops of the Red Far Eastern Republic. After initial success against a detachment of some 250–300 Red Army soldiers, Ungern's army slowly advanced to the Russian town of Troitskosavsk (present-day Kyakhta in Buryatia). Meanwhile, the Reds moved large numbers of troops towards Mongolia from different directions. They had a tremendous advantage in equipment and number of troops. As a result, Ungern was defeated in battles that took place between 11–13 June by joint actions of the 35th Division of the 5th Red Army (commander Mikhail Matiyasevich), Far Eastern Republic and Mongolian People's Party troops, and was forced to retreated to Mongolia. Combined Bolshevik and Red Mongol forces entered Mongolia and captured Urga on 6 July 1921, after a few skirmishes with Ungern's troops.

Although they had captured Urga, the Red forces failed to defeat the main forces of the Asiatic Division (Ungern's and Rezukhin's brigades), which had regrouped in the area of Akhai-gun-hure on the Selenga River. From July 18 to July 21, the Red expeditionary corps fought bitter battles against the Whites, but the latter, thanks to the mobility of their cavalry, managed to break away from them. On July 24, troops of the White Guards and Mongolian feudal lords again penetrated Soviet territory in the region north of Lake Gusinoye, but on August 3, upon learning of the approach of superior Red Army forces, they began to retreat.

Ungern wanted to continue the war with the Reds, but most of his White Guards troops wanted to go to Manchuria. An insurrection occurred in the Asian division, as a result of which Rezukhin was killed on August 18, and Ungern was captured on August 20 by the Red partisans. Most of the division reached the Hailar District in Manchuria.

== Aftermath ==
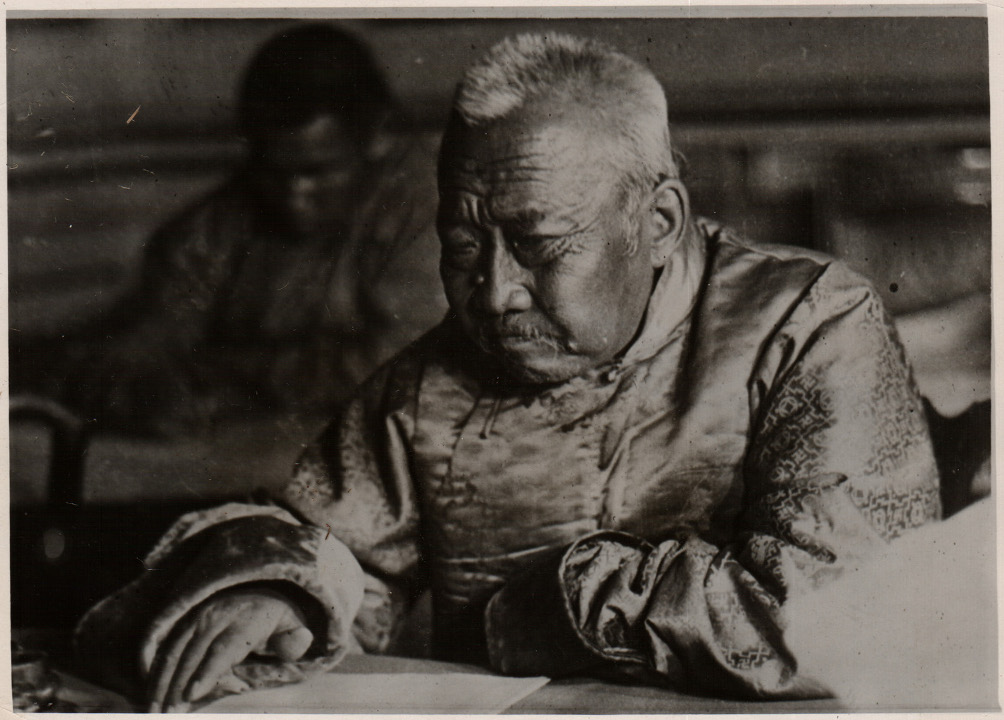
Tserendorj, head of the Mongolian delegation in Moscow, signing treaty between Mongolia and the Russian Soviet Government.

As a result of the operation, Baron Ungern was captured and executed on 15 September 1921, the white Russian and Mongolian feudal troops were defeated, and the power of the Bogd Khanate of Mongolia was eliminated. A Provisional People's Government under the control of the Bolsheviks was established, which would become the Mongolian People's Republic in 1924.

== Sources ==
- БСЭ (3-е издание)
- Kuzmin S. L. History of Baron Ungern. Reconstruction experience. M., ed. KVM, 2011.

== See also ==
- List of states and regions involved in the Russian Civil War
- Bibliography of the Russian Revolution and Civil War
- Outline of the Russian Revolution and Civil War
- Occupation of Mongolia
- Soviet invasion of Xinjiang
- Soviet occupation of Manchuria
