= Roman von Ungern-Sternberg =

Russian general and warlord (1886–1921)

Baron Roman von Ungern-Sternberg
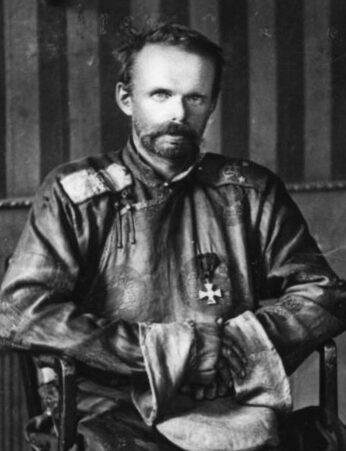
- Ungern-Sternberg in Irkutsk under interrogation at the headquarters of the 5th Red Army, 1921
- Born: Nikolai Robert Maximilian Freiherr von Ungern-Sternberg; 10 January 1886; Graz, Austria-Hungary
- Died: 15 September 1921 (aged 35); Novonikolayevsk, Russian SFSR
- Cause of death: Execution by firing squad
- Spouse: Elena Pavlovna "Ji" (m. 1919; div. 1920)
- Military career
- Allegiance: Russia (1906–1917); Bogd Khanate of Mongolia (1917–1921)
- Branch: Imperial Russian Army; White Army
- Service years: 1906–1921
- Rank: Lieutenant general
- Nicknames: The Mad Baron; The Bloody Baron
- Commands: Asiatic Cavalry Division
- Conflicts: World War I; Russian Civil War; Mongolian Revolution of 1921; Battle of Urga; Battles in Choir and Zamyn-Üüd; Soviet intervention in Mongolia (executed)
- Awards: St. George of the 4th grade; St. Vladimir of the 4th grade; St. Anna of the 3rd and 4th grades; St. Stanislas of the 3rd grade; Russo-Japanese War Medal

Baron Nikolai Robert Maximilian Freiherr von Ungern-Sternberg (Russian: Роман Фёдорович фон Унгерн-Штернберг, romanized: Roman Fyodorovich fon Ungern-Shternberg; 10 January 1886 – 15 September 1921), often referred to as Roman von Ungern-Sternberg or Baron Ungern, was a Russian military leader of German descent who served in the Russian Civil War and later became an independent warlord who intervened in Mongolia against China.

Part of the Russian Empire's Baltic German minority, Ungern was an ultraconservative monarchist who aspired to restore the Russian monarchy after the 1917 Russian Revolution and to revive the Mongol Empire under the rule of the Bogd Khan. His attraction to Vajrayana Buddhism and his eccentric, often violent, treatment of enemies and his own men earned him the sobriquet "the Mad Baron" or "the Bloody Baron".

In February 1921, at the head of the Asiatic Cavalry Division, Ungern expelled Chinese troops from Mongolia and restored the monarchic power of the Bogd Khan. During his five-month occupation of Outer Mongolia, Ungern imposed order on the capital city, Ikh Khüree (now Ulaanbaatar), by fear, intimidation and brutal violence against the Bolsheviks and Chinese. In June 1921, he travelled to eastern Siberia to support anti-Bolshevik partisan forces and to head off a joint Red Army-Mongolian rebel invasion. That action ultimately led to his defeat and capture two months later. He was taken prisoner by the Red Army and, a month later, was put on trial for counter-revolution in Novonikolayevsk, now Novosibirsk. He was found guilty after a six-hour show trial, and on 15 September 1921 he was executed.

== Early life ==
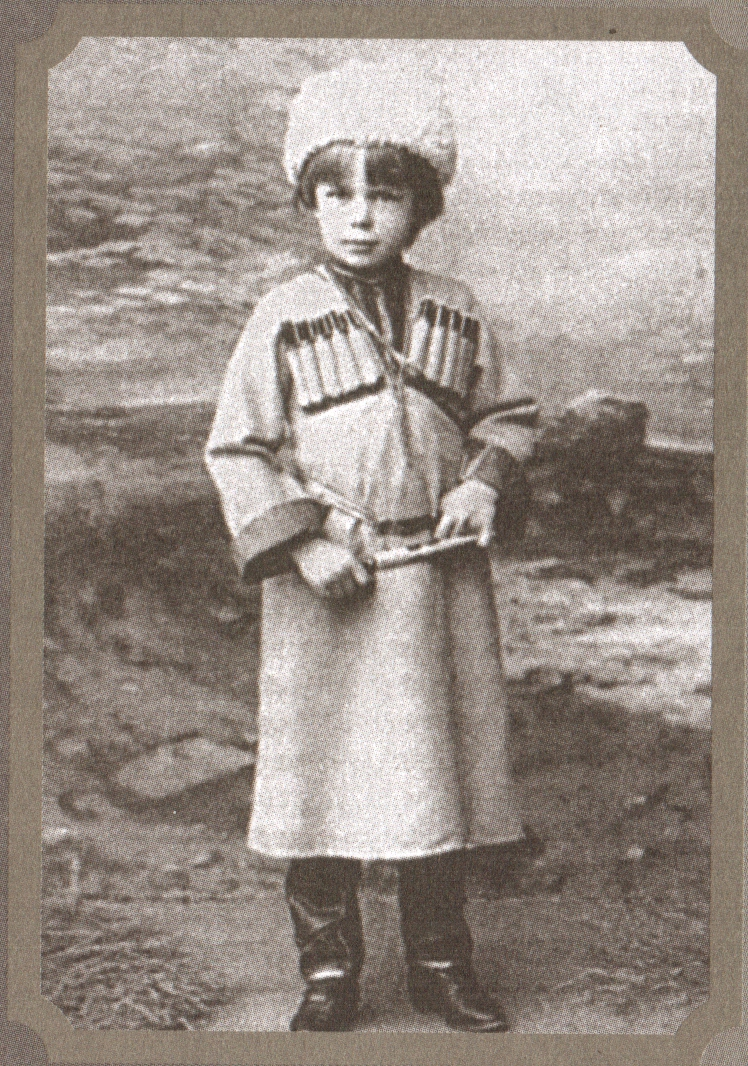
Ungern-Sternberg as a child.

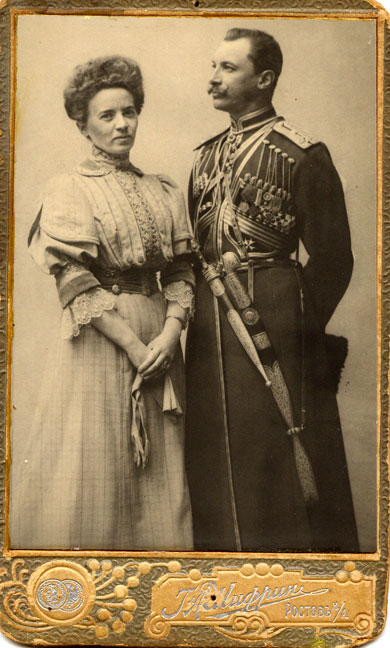
Sophie Charlotte von Wimpffen and Theodor Leonhard Rudolph Freiherr von Ungern-Sternberg

Nikolai Robert Maximilian Freiherr von Ungern-Sternberg was born in Graz, Austria, on 10 January 1886 [O.S. 29 December 1885] to a noble Baltic German family. The Ungern-Sternberg family had settled in present-day Estonia during the Middle Ages. Ungern-Sternberg's first language was German, but he became fluent in French, Russian, English and Estonian. His mother was a German noblewoman, Sophie Charlotte von Wimpffen, later Sophie Charlotte von Ungern-Sternberg. His father was Theodor Leonhard Rudolph Freiherr von Ungern-Sternberg (1857–1918). He also had Hungarian roots and claimed descent from Batu Khan, Genghis Khan's grandson, which played a role in his dream of reviving the Mongol Empire.

In 1888 his family moved to Reval (Tallinn), the capital of the Governorate of Estonia in the Russian Empire. His parents divorced in 1891. In 1894 his mother married the Baltic-German nobleman Oskar Anselm Hermann Freiherr von Hoyningen-Huene. Ungern-Sternberg grew up in the Governorate, with his home being the Hoyningen-Huene estate at Jerwakant (modern Järvakandi, Estonia), deep in the forests, about 65 kilometres (40 miles) from Reval. In the summer, Ungern-Sternberg lived on the Baltic island of Dagö (now Hiiumaa), which he liked to boast had belonged to his family for over 200 years.

As a boy, Ungern-Sternberg was noted for being such a ferocious bully that even the other bullies feared him and several parents forbade their children from playing with him as he was a "terror". Ungern was well known for his love of torturing animals, and at the age of 12 he tried to strangle to death his cousin's pet owl. Ungern-Sternberg had extreme pride in his ancient, aristocratic family and later wrote that his family had over the centuries "never taken orders from the working classes" and it was outrageous that "dirty workers who've never had any servants of their own, but still think they can command" should have any say in the ruling of the vast Russian Empire.

Ungern-Sternberg, although proud of his German origin, identified himself very strongly with the Russian Empire. When asked whether his "family had distinguished itself in Russian service", Ungern proudly answered: "Seventy-two killed in wartime!". Ungern-Sternberg believed that return to monarchies in Europe was possible with the aid of "cavalry people" – meaning Russian Cossacks, Buryats, Tatars, Mongols, Kyrgyz, Kalmyks, etc.

In 1898, his father was briefly imprisoned for fraud before being committed to the local insane asylum the following year. From 1900 to 1902 Ungern attended the Nicholas I Gymnasium in Reval. His school records show an unruly, bad-tempered young man who was constantly in trouble with his teachers because of frequent fights with other cadets and breaking other school rules: smoking in bed, growing long hair, leaving without permission, etc.

In February 1905, the schoolmaster wrote to his stepfather and mother, asking them to withdraw him from the school or he would be expelled. They chose withdrawal, and Ungern joined the fighting in eastern Russia during the Russo-Japanese War. It is unclear whether he saw action against the Japanese or if all military operations had ceased before his arrival in Manchuria, although he was awarded the Russo-Japanese War Medal in 1913.

During the 1905 Russian Revolution, Estonian peasants went on a bloody jacquerie against the Baltic-German nobility, who owned most of the land. Aristocrats were lynched and their estates burned down, among them the one at Jerwakant where Ungern-Sternberg had grown up. These events were traumatic for Ungern-Sternberg, confirming his belief that the Estonian peasants who worked on his family's lands were all "rough, untutored, wild and constantly angry, hating everybody and everything without understanding why".

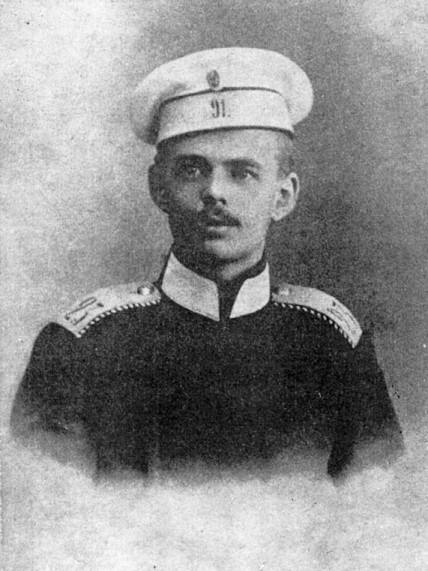
R.F. Ungern in the uniform of the 91st Infantry Dvinsky Regiment

In 1906, Ungern was transferred to the Pavlovsk Military School, in St. Petersburg, as a cadet of ordinary rank. As an army cadet, he proved to be a better student than he ever was as a naval cadet, and he actually studied his course material, but in the words of Palmer, he was a "mediocre student" at best. During the same period, Ungern-Sternberg became obsessed with the occult and developed an interest in Buddhism. His cousin Count Hermann von Keyserling, who later knew him well, wrote that the baron was very curious from his teenage years onward with "Tibetan and Hindu philosophy" and often spoke of the mystical powers possessed by "geometrical symbols". Keyserling called Ungern-Sternberg "one of the most metaphysically and occultly gifted men I have ever met" and believed that the baron could read minds.

Later, in Mongolia, Ungern became a Buddhist but did not leave the Lutheran faith. There is a widespread view that he was viewed by Mongols as the incarnation of the "God of War", the figure of Jamsaran in Tibetan and Mongol folklore. Comparison of old narrations collected by B. Rinchen with scattered memoir data and memories preserved in Mongolia suggested that Ungern could be associated with Gesar, who in some Buddhist representations of the Mongols was considered the God of war and associated with Jamsaran. Although many Mongols may have believed him to be a deity or at the very least a re-incarnation of Genghis Khan, Ungern was never officially proclaimed to be any of those incarnations.

After graduating, he specifically asked to be stationed with a Cossack regiment in Asia, to learn more about Asian culture. His request was granted, and he served as an officer in eastern Siberia in the 1st Argunsky and then in the 1st Amursky Cossack regiments, where he became enthralled with the lifestyle of nomadic peoples, such as the Mongols and Buryats.

Ungern-Sternberg was notorious for his heavy drinking and exceptionally cantankerous moods. In one such brawl, his face was scarred when the officer that he fought struck him with his sword. It was rumored that brain damage from the injury had affected his sanity. A special study found that Ungern-Sternberg was sane, although the wound affected his irritability.

In 1913, at his request, he transferred to the reserves. Ungern moved to Outer Mongolia to assist the Mongols in their struggle for independence from China, but Russian officials prevented him from fighting on the side of Mongolian troops. He arrived in the town of Khovd, in western Mongolia, and served as an out-of-staff officer in the Cossack guard detachment at the Russian consulate.

== First World War ==
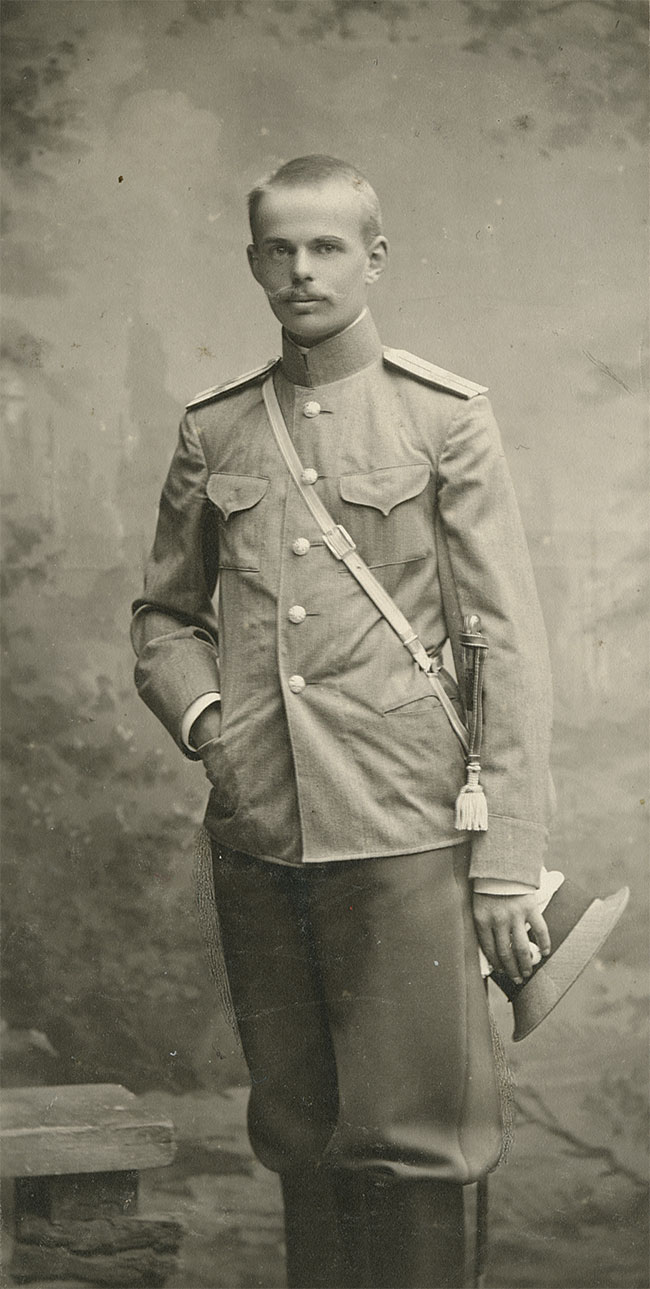
Ungern-Sternberg circa 1909

On 19 July 1914, Ungern joined frontline forces as part of the second-turn 34th Regiment of Cossack troops stationed on the Austro-Hungarian frontier in Galicia. He took part in the Russian offensive in East Prussia. From 1915 to 1916, he participated in rear-action raids on German troops by the L.N. Punin Cavalry Special Task Force. Ungern served in the Nerchinsk Regiment.

On the Eastern Front, he gained a reputation as an extremely brave but somewhat reckless and mentally unstable officer. Showing no fear of death, he seemed happiest leading cavalry charges and being in the thick of combat. General Pyotr Wrangel mentions Ungern's determination in his memoirs. He received the orders of St. George of the 4th grade, St. Vladimir of the 4th grade, St. Anna of the 3rd and 4th grades and St. Stanislas of the 3rd grade. These decorations were offset by disciplinary issues: he was eventually discharged from one of his command positions for attacking another officer and a hall porter during a drunken rage in October 1916, for which he was sentenced to two months in prison after a court martial.

After his release, in January 1917, Ungern was transferred to the Caucasian Theatre of the conflict, where Russia was fighting against the Ottoman Empire. The February Revolution that ended the rule of the House of Romanov was an extremely bitter blow to the monarchist Ungern-Sternberg, who saw it as the beginning of the end of Russia. In the Caucasus, Ungern-Sternberg first met Cossack Captain Grigory Semyonov, later one of the most well-known Russian anticommunist warlords in Siberia.

In April 1917, Ungern, together with Semyonov, started to organise a volunteer Assyrian Christian unit near Urmia, Iran. The Assyrian genocide under the Ottoman Empire led to thousands of Assyrians fleeing to the Russian lines. Ungern and Semyonov organised Assyrian troops to serve as an example for the Russian army, generally demoralised by the revolutionary mood. The Assyrians scored some minor victories over the Turks, but their contribution to Russia's war effort was limited. Afterwards, the Assyrian scheme led Semyonov to the idea of placing Buryat troops in Siberia. The Kerensky government gave its approval, and Ungern-Sternberg soon headed east to join his friend in raising a Buryat regiment.

== Russian Civil War ==
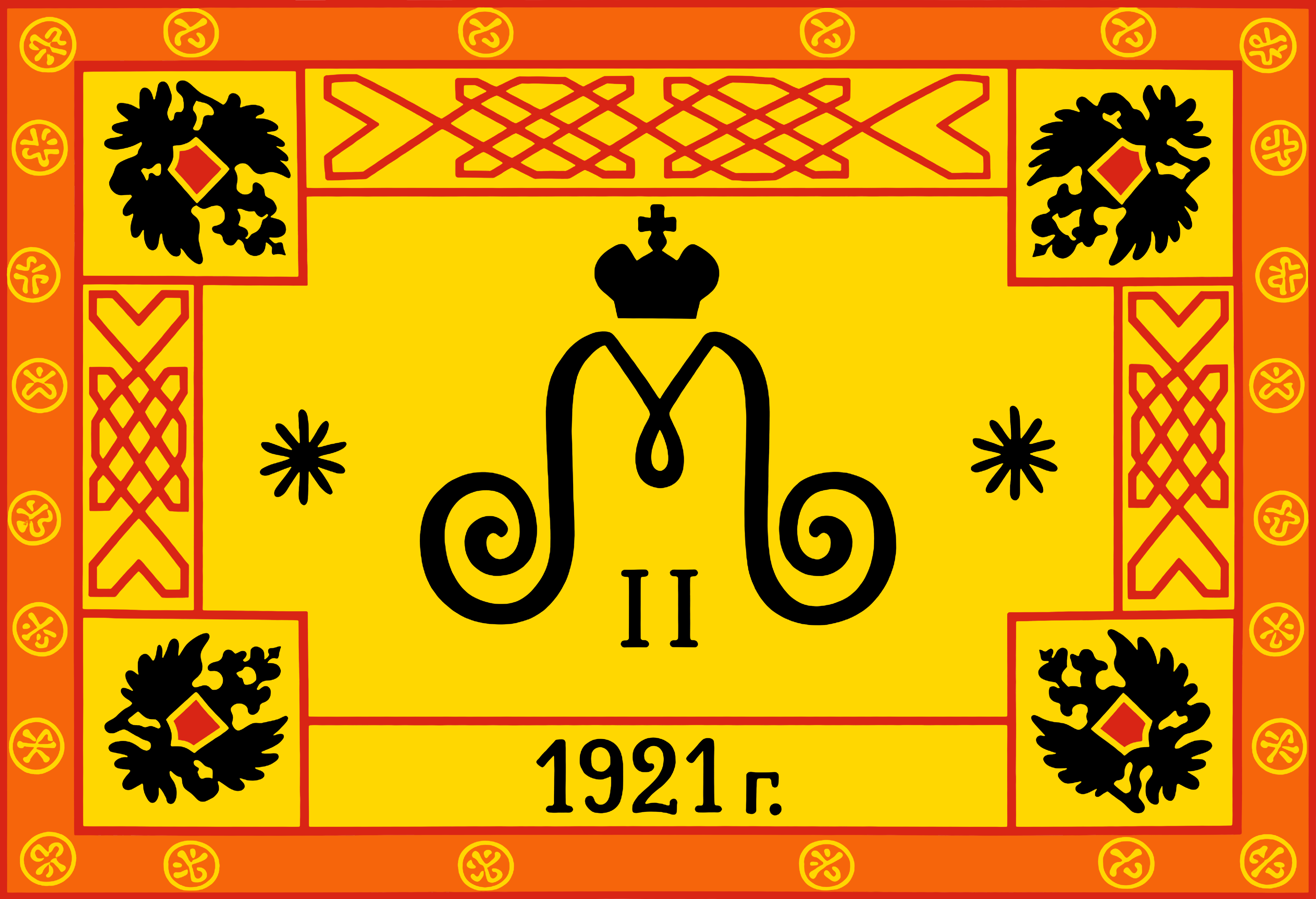
Flag of Baron Ungern's Asian Cavalry Division

After the Bolshevik-led October Revolution in 1917, Semyonov and Ungern declared their allegiance to the Romanov dynasty, making themselves part of the White Army, vowing to fight the revolutionaries' Red Army. Late that year, they and five Cossacks peacefully disarmed a group of about 1,500 Reds at a railway station in Manchuria on the Far Eastern Railway (FER) in China, near the Russian border. They maintained it as a stronghold in their preparations for war in the Transbaikal region, raising troops in a Special Manchurian Regiment, the nucleus of forces led by Grigory Semyonov.

After the White troops defeated the Reds on a section of the FER line in Russia, Semyonov appointed Ungern commandant of troops stationed in Dauria, a railway station in a strategic position east-southeast of Lake Baikal. Semyonov and Ungern, though fervently anti-Bolshevik, were not typical of the figures to be found in the leadership of the White movement, as their plans differed from those of the main White leaders. Semyonov refused to recognize the authority of Admiral Alexander Kolchak, the nominal leader of the Whites in Siberia. Instead, he acted independently and was supported by the Japanese with arms and money.

For White leaders like Kolchak and Denikin, who believed in a "Russia strong and indivisible", that represented high treason. Ungern, nominally subordinate to Semyonov, also often acted independently. Kolchak was a conservative but not a monarchist, and he promised that after the victory of the Whites he would reconvene the Constituent Assembly, disbanded by the Bolsheviks in January 1918, which would then decide the future of Russia, including the question of whether to restore the monarchy.

Ungern, to the contrary, believed that monarchs were accountable only to God, and the monarchy was the political system that God had chosen for Russia and so it was self-evident that it should be restored as it had been before the October Manifesto of 1905. For Ungern, the opinions of the people of Russia were irrelevant, as monarchs were not accountable to them.

Because of his successful military operations in Hailar and Dauria, Ungern received the rank of major-general. Semyonov entrusted him with forming military units to battle Bolshevik forces. They enrolled Buryats and Mongols in their national military units.

During this time, Semyonov and Ungern grew personally distant although neither admitted it publicly. Ungern, whose interest in Buddhism had led him to follow an increasingly ascetic personal lifestyle, was disgusted by his mentor's corruption and debauchery. In particular, the virulently antisemitic Ungern was so outraged by Semyonov's public affair with a Jewish cabaret singer that he named one of his horses after her. Semyonov was also uninterested in ensuring that his subordinates followed his orders. Combined with Ungern's tendency to act on his own, this greatly impaired their combined military effectiveness.

In Dauria, Ungern formed the volunteer Asiatic Cavalry Division (ACD), creating a fortress where he launched attacks on Red forces. Under his rule, Dauria became a well-known "torture centre" filled with the bones of dozens of Ungern's victims, who were executed as Reds or thieves. Ungern's chief executioner had been a Colonel Laurentz, but in Mongolia, Ungern had him executed because he lost Ungern's trust under unclear circumstances.

Like many other White units, Ungern's troops used "requisitions" of freight on Manchuria-bound trains passing through Dauria as supplies. Their confiscations did not significantly diminish the supplies of Kolchak's forces, but private Russian and Chinese merchants lost considerable property.

In 1919, taking advantage of the instability in Russia, the Chinese government, established by members of the Anhui military party, sent troops, led by General Xu Shuzheng, to join Outer Mongolia to China. This action violated the terms of a tripartite Russian-Mongolian-Chinese agreement concluded in 1915 that secured Mongolian autonomy and did not allow the presence of Chinese troops except minimal consular guards. Although the Anhui party was supported by Japan, indications of Japan-inspired Chinese occupation of Outer Mongolia have not yet been confirmed by documents.

After the fall of Anhui party rule in China, Chinese soldiers in Mongolia found themselves effectively abandoned. They rebelled against their commanders, plundering and killing Mongols and foreigners. Some of the Chinese troops during the occupation were Tsahar (Chahar) Mongols from Inner Mongolia, a major cause of animosity between Outer Mongols (Khalkhas) and Inner Mongols.

As part of his plans, Ungern travelled to Manchuria and China between February and September 1919, establishing contacts with monarchist circles and making preparations for Semyonov to meet the Manchurian warlord Marshal Zhang Zuolin, the "Old Marshal".

In July 1919, Ungern married the Manchurian princess Ji, who was just 19, in an Orthodox ceremony in Harbin. The princess was given the name Elena Pavlovna; she and Ungern communicated in English, their only common language. The marriage had a political aim, as Ji was a relative of General Zhang Kuiwu, the commander of Chinese troops at the western end of the Chinese-Manchurian Railway and the governor of Hailar.

== Restoration of Outer Mongolian independence ==
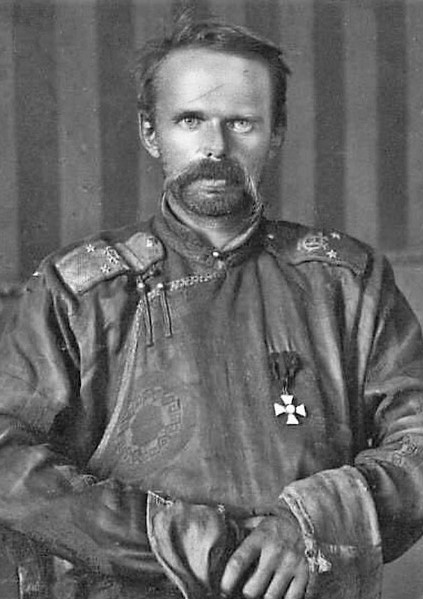
Ungern-Sternberg in a Mongolian deel uniform with a Russian Order of St. George 4th Class

After Kolchak's defeat by the Reds and Japan's subsequent decision to withdraw its expeditionary troops from the Transbaikal, Semyonov, unable to withstand the pressure of Bolshevik forces, planned a retreat to Manchuria. Ungern saw it as an opportunity to implement his monarchist plan. The ACD was then approximately 1,500 men, mostly Russian Cossacks, but with Buryat, Chinese and a few Japanese, all under Russian command, with rifles, machine guns and four artillery pieces.

Ungern drove them mercilessly in training, maintaining even stricter discipline than he had previously. Minor offences were punished by lashings with bamboo. Soldiers committing more serious violations were usually executed. On 7 August 1920, he broke his allegiance to Semyonov and transformed the ACD into a guerrilla detachment. After crossing the Outer Mongolian border on 1 October, they moved southwest, then moved westwards to the Mongolian capital of Urga (officially Niislel Khuree, now Ulaanbaatar). There, he entered into negotiations with Chinese occupying forces. All of his demands, including the disarmament of Chinese troops, were rejected.

On 26–27 October and again on 2–4 November 1920, Ungern's troops assaulted Urga but suffered disastrous losses. After the defeat, his forces retreated to the upper currents of the Kherlen River, in Setsen-Khan Aimag, a district ruled by princes with the title Setsen Khan, in eastern Outer Mongolia. He was supported by Mongols who sought independence from Chinese occupation, especially the spiritual and secular leader of Mongols, the Bogd Khan, who secretly sent Ungern his blessing for expelling Chinese from Mongolia.

Ungern's devotion to harsh discipline remained unabated. After learning that a lieutenant he had initially favored and put in command of the medical division had, during the retreat, sexually assaulted the nurses (many of whom were married to other officers), looted settlements the unit passed through and ordered all the wounded fatally poisoned because they were "a nuisance", Ungern ordered the man flogged and then burned at the stake.

The Chinese had tightened their control of Outer Mongolia by then, by strictly regulating Buddhist services in monasteries and imprisoning Russians and Mongols whom they considered "separatists". According to the memoirs of M. G. Tornovsky, the ACD numbered 1,460 men, while the Chinese garrison was 7,000 strong. The Chinese had the advantage in artillery and machine guns and had built a network of trenches in and around Urga.

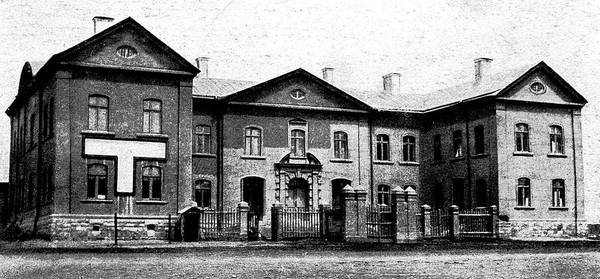
The Mongolor Building of Urga in which the Chinese made their last stand and Ungern made his headquarters

Ungern's troops began moving from their camp to Urga on 31 January. On 2 February, they battled for control of Chinese front lines and secured parts of Urga. His detachment, led by B. P. Rezukhin, captured Chinese front-line fortifications near Small Madachan and Big Madachan settlements in the southeastern vicinities of Urga. During the battle Ungern's special detachment of Tibetans, Mongols, Buryats, and Russians rescued the Bogd Khan from house arrest and transported him through the Bogd Uul to Manjushri Monastery. At the same time, another detachment moved to the mountains east of Urga.

The following day, he gave his soldiers a respite. Borrowing a tactic from Genghis Khan, he ordered his troops to light a large number of campfires in the hills surrounding Urga and to use them as reference points for Rezukhin's detachment. That made the town appear to be surrounded by an overwhelming force.

Early on 4 February, Ungern launched an assault on the Chinese White barracks from the east, captured them and divided his forces into two parts. They first launched a major assault on the remaining Chinese positions in the Chinese trade settlement (Chinese: 買賣城, Maimaicheng, "buy-sell-city"). The second moved westwards towards the Consular Settlement. Upon reaching the Maimaicheng, Ungern had his men storm their way in by blasting the gates with explosives and improvised battering rams. After breaking in, a general slaughter set in, as both sides fought with sabres.

After the capture of Maimaicheng, Ungern joined his troops attacking Chinese troops at the Consular Settlement. After a Chinese counterattack, Ungern's soldiers retreated a short distance northeast and then launched another attack with the support of another Cossack and Mongolian detachment, which began an attack from the northeast and northwest. Ungern's troops gradually moved westwards in Urga, pursuing retreating Chinese soldiers.

The capital city was finally taken on the evening of 4 February. Chinese civilian administrators and military commanders abandoned their soldiers and fled northwards from Urga in 11 cars in the night of 3–4 February. Chinese troops fled northward on 4 and 5 February. They massacred any Mongolian civilians they encountered along the road from Urga to the Russian border.

Russian settlers who supported the Reds moved from Urga, together with the fleeing Chinese troops. During the capture of Urga, the Chinese lost about 1500 men, and Ungern's forces suffered about 60 casualties.

After the battle, Ungern's troops, initially welcomed as liberators by a populace tired of living under Chinese rule, began plundering Chinese stores and killing Russian Jews who were living in Urga, as the Cossacks had also been set against the Jews. Ungern himself ordered the Jews to be killed except for those who had notes from him sparing their lives. It has been estimated by surviving archival documents and memoirs that 43–50 Jews were killed during Ungern's stay in Mongolia, about 5–6% of all those executed under his orders. This pogrom effectively eliminated Urga's entire Jewish community at the time.

Several days later, Ungern stopped the looting, but his secret police bureau, led by Colonel Leonid Sipailov, who had already developed a reputation for serious brutality under Ungern in Russia, continued searching for "Reds". Between 11 and 13 March, Ungern captured a fortified Chinese base at Choir, between the Otsol Uul and Choiryn Bogd Uul Mountains, south of Urga. Ungern had 900 troops and the Chinese defenders about 1500. After capturing Choir, Ungern returned to Urga. His detachments, consisting of Cossacks and Mongols, moved southward to Zamyn-Üüd, a frontier settlement and another Chinese base. The defending Chinese soldiers abandoned Zamyn-Üüd without a fight.

When the remaining Chinese troops, having retreated to northern Mongolia near Kyakhta, attempted to go around Urga to the west to reach China, the Russians and the Mongols feared that they were attempting to recapture Urga. Several hundred Cossack and Mongol troops were dispatched to stop the several thousand Chinese in the area of Talyn Ulaankhad Hill near the Urga–Uliastai road in central Mongolia. After a battle that raged from 30 March to 2 April in which more than a thousand Chinese and approximately 100 Mongols, Russians and Buryats were killed, the Chinese were routed and chased to the southern border of the country. Thus Chinese forces left Outer Mongolia.

== Mongolia and Ungern (February to August 1921) ==
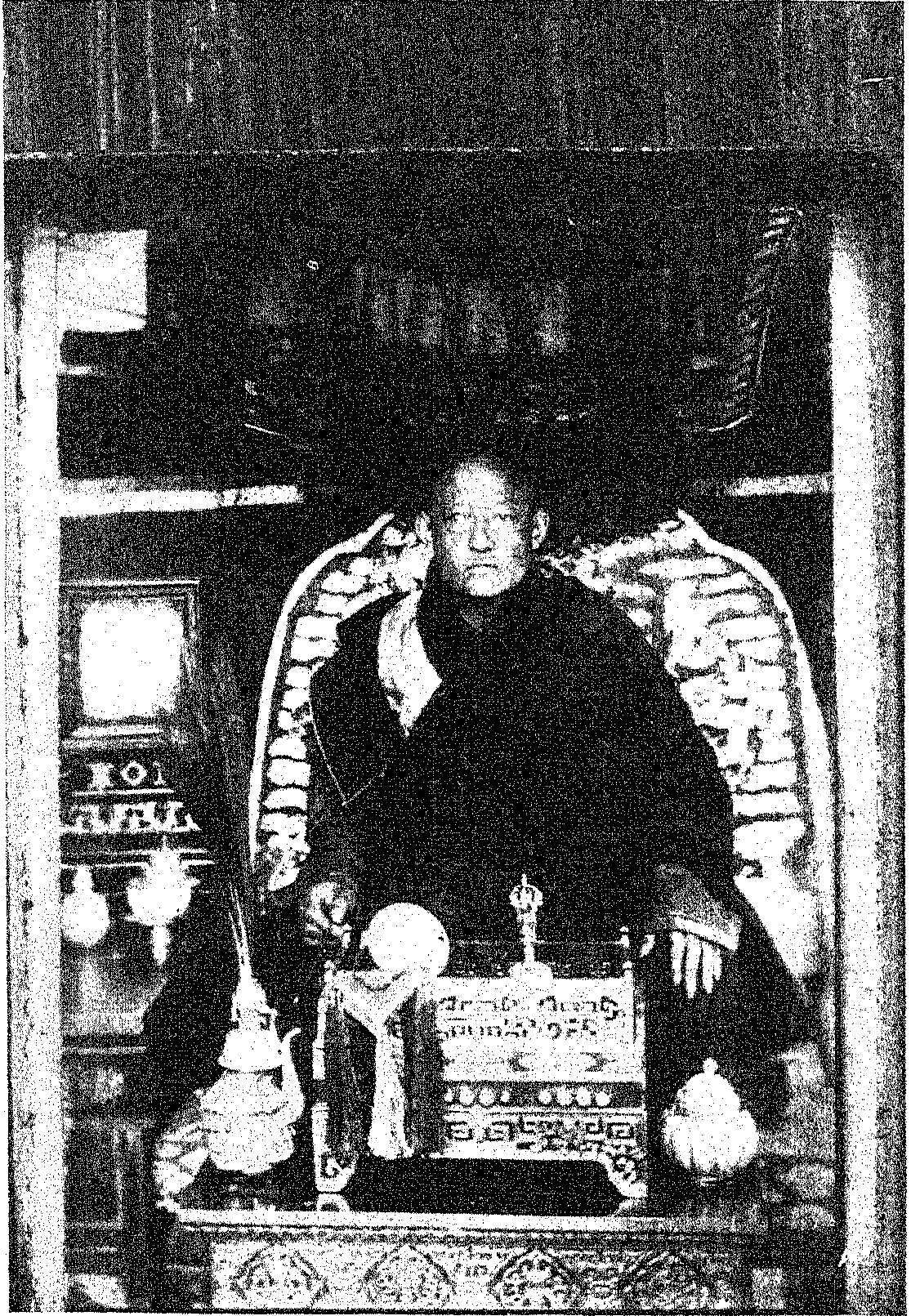
The Bogd Khan (1869–1924) in the Khan's Green Palace

Ungern, Mongolian lamas and princes brought the Bogd Khan from Manjusri Monastery to Urga on 21 February 1921. On 22 February, a solemn ceremony took place to restore the Bogd Khan to the throne. As a reward for ousting the Chinese from Urga, the Bogd Khan granted Ungern the high hereditary title darkhan khoshoi chin wang in the degree of khan, and other privileges. Other officers, lamas and princes who had participated in these events also received high titles and awards.

On 22 February 1921, Mongolia was proclaimed an independent monarchy. Supreme power over Mongolia belonged to the Bogd Khan, or the 8th Bogd Gegen Jebtsundamba Khutuktu.

Ossendowski had served as an official in Kolchak's government and, after its collapse, fled to Mongolia. He became one of Ungern's very few friends, and in 1922, published a best-selling book in English, Beasts, Men and Gods, about his adventures in Siberia and Mongolia. Comparison of Ossendowski's diary with his book and documents on Mongolia revealed that his reports on Mongolia at Ungern are largely true, except for a few stories. Ossendowski was the first to describe Ungern's views in terms of Theosophy, but Ungern himself had never been a Theosophist.

A similar novel, Asian Odyssey, written by Dmitri Alioshin, who was a soldier in Ungern's forces, describes the millenarist beliefs common among Ungern's supporters:

The whole world is rotten. Greed, hatred and cruelty are in the saddle. We intend to organize a new empire; a new civilization. It will be called the Middle Asiatic Buddhist Empire, carved out of Mongolia, Manchuria and Eastern Siberia. Communication has already been established for that purpose with Djan-Zo-Lin, the war lord of Manchuria, and with Hutukhta, the Living Buddha of Mongolia. Here in these historic plains we will organize an army as powerful as that of Genghis Khan. Then we will move, as that great man did, and smash the whole of Europe. The world must die so that a new and better world may come forth, reincarnated on a higher plane.

According to the interrogation protocol, which is given in the book "Baron Ungern in Documents and Memoirs," he never sought the independence of Mongolia:

I didn't even think about sovereignty of Mongolia. I spoke of independence in the sense that it was just a slogan. I imagined Mongolia's fate as being subservient to the Manchu Khan... I believed that under the leadership of the Manchu Khan, a circle such as Mongolia, Tibet, China, and all the nomadic peoples of Siberia and the Central Asian lands would be created. All my correspondence with the outside world was aimed at establishing this order. I wrote about this several times to the Chinese monarchist generals Li Zhangkui (Zhang Kun) and others, proving to them the need to begin saving humanity from destruction by reviving a strong stronghold of culture - the kings.

Hutukhta did not share Ungern's enthusiasm for re-establishing monarchy across the continent, knowing that his small army would likely be vanquished by the Soviets or Chinese long before any of these ambitions could be realized. In April 1921 he wrote to Beijing distancing Outer Mongolia from Ungern's vision and asking if the Chinese government would be interested in resuming the dominant relationship it had under the former emperors. Ungern began seeking other sources of support. Japan, believed by the Soviets to be supporting Ungern extensively, instead doubted the capability of the ACD and considered the mercurial Ungern harder to work with than Semyonov had been. The Chinese warlords Ungern reached out to also rejected his plans, even Zhang Zuolin, then in control of most of Manchuria, to whom Ungern offered the throne of a hypothetical empire that would stretch to Central Asia.

Ungern did not interfere in Mongolian affairs and assisted Mongols only in some issues according to orders of the Bogd Khan. Russian colonists, on the other hand, suffered cruelties from Ungern's secret police bureau led by Sipailov. A list of people known to have been killed on Ungern's orders or by others on their pretext, both in Russia and Mongolia, confirms the deaths of 846 people, approximately 100–120 from Urga, about 3–8% of the total foreign colony population. Ungern's unrelenting harshness contributed to discontent that later erupted in mutiny among his troops.

Dozens of Tibetans also served as part of his troops. They might have been sent by 13th Dalai Lama, with whom Ungern communicated, or the Tibetans may have belonged to the Tibetan colony in Urga.

The presence of the Japanese unit in the division is often explained as evidence that Japan stood behind Ungern in his actions in Mongolia. However, studies of their interrogations from Japanese archives revealed that they were mercenaries serving on their own, like other nationals in the division, and that Ungern was not managed by Japan.

Owen Lattimore used the words "a strange, romantic and sometimes savage figure" for the Mongol Sandagdorjiyn Magsarjav (1877–1927). Magsarjav had served under Ungern-Sternberg. In Uriankhai, Kazakh bandits who were captured had their hearts cut out and sacrificed by Magsarjav.

== Defeat, capture and execution ==
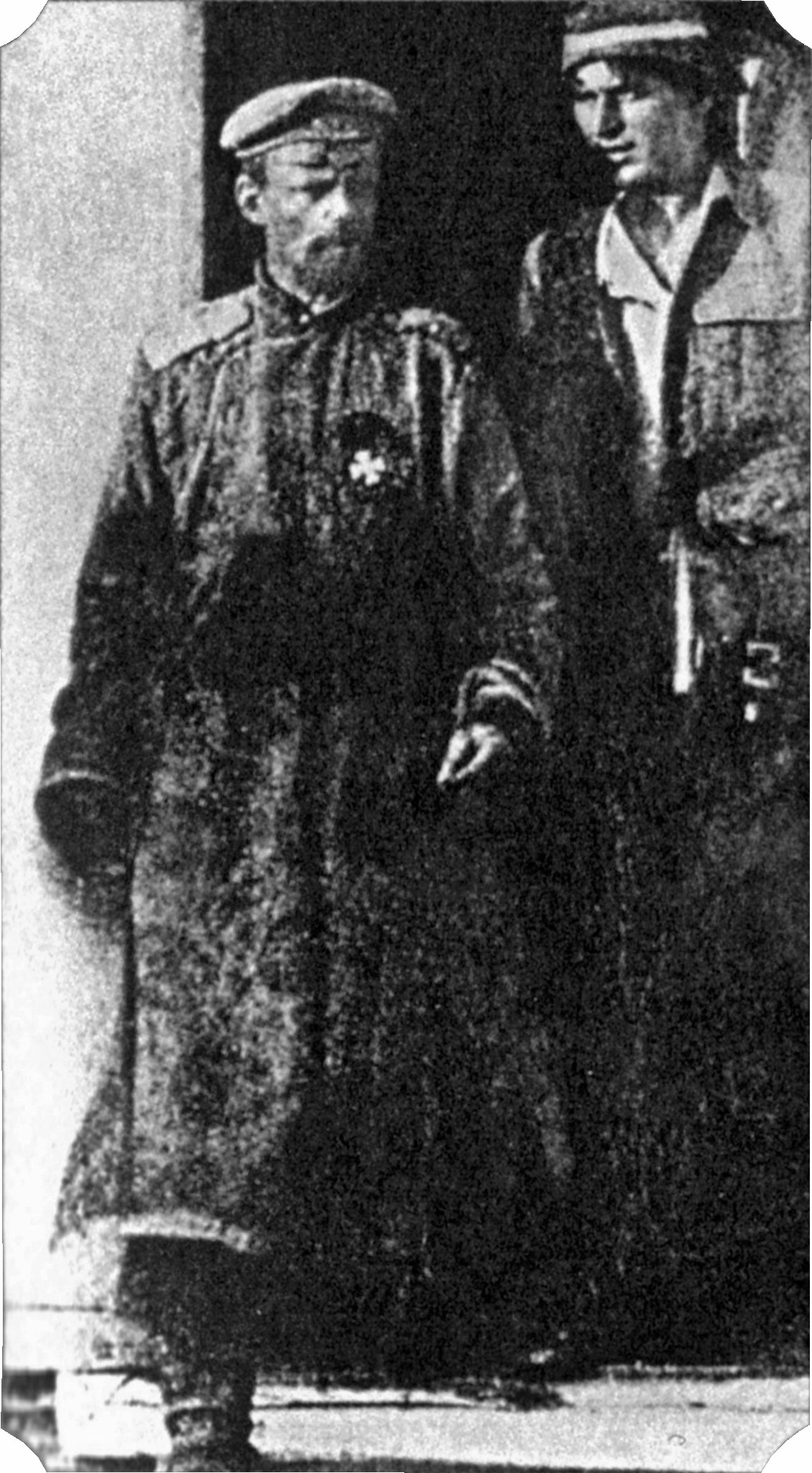
Ungern-Sternberg captured in 1921, with Pyotr Shchetinkin

The Bolsheviks started infiltrating Mongolia shortly after the October Revolution, long before they took control of the Russian Transbaikal. In 1921, various Red Army units belonging to Soviet Russia and to the Far Eastern Republic invaded the newly independent Mongolia to defeat Ungern. The forces included the Red Mongolian leader Damdin Sükhbaatar. The Soviets also began supporting the newly formed Mongolian People's Party and its partisans in actions against Ungern and the government.

Spies and various smaller diversionary units went ahead to spread terror to weaken Ungern's forces. Ungern organised an expedition to meet these forces in Siberia and to support ongoing anti-Bolshevik rebellions. (Note: There was also the possibility of joining a White remnant in the Primorye, but that would have required briefly marching across China, where local troops might not have received Ungern well in the wake of his slaughter of the Chinese troops in Urga, and in any event the remaining Whites did not share Ungern's desire to restore the monarchy) Believing that he had the unwavering popular support of locals in Siberia and Mongolia, Ungern failed to strengthen his troops properly, although he was vastly outnumbered and outgunned by the Red forces. He did not know that the Reds had successfully crushed uprisings in Siberia and that Soviet economic policies had temporarily softened in Lenin's New Economic Policy. Upon Ungern's arrival in Siberia, few local peasants and Cossacks volunteered to join him.

In the spring, the Asiatic Cavalry Division was divided into two brigades: one under the command of Lieutenant General Ungern and the second under Major General Rezukhin. In May, Rezukhin's brigade launched a raid beyond the Russian border, west of the Selenga River. Ungern's brigade left Urga and slowly moved to the Russian town of Troitskosavsk (present-day Kyakhta in Buryatia).

Meanwhile, the Reds moved large numbers of troops towards Mongolia from different directions. They had a tremendous advantage in equipment (armoured cars, aeroplanes, rail, gunboats, ammunition, human reserves etc.) and the number of troops. As a result, Ungern was defeated in battles that took place between 11 and 13 June, and he failed to capture Troitskosavsk. Combined Bolshevik and Red Mongol forces entered Urga on 6 July 1921 after a few small skirmishes with Ungern's guard detachments.

Chinese forces slaughtered most of a 350-strong White Russian force in June 1921 under Colonel Kazagrandi in the Gobi desert, with only two batches of 42 men and 35 men surrendering separately as Chinese were wiping out White Russian remnants following the Soviet Red army defeat of Ungern-Sternberg. Other Buryat and White Russian remnants of Ungern-Sternberg's army were also massacred by Soviet Red Army and Mongol forces that same summer. In Uliastai, Mongols beat Colonel Vangdabov's Buryats to death with clubs for being loyal to Ungern-Sternberg.

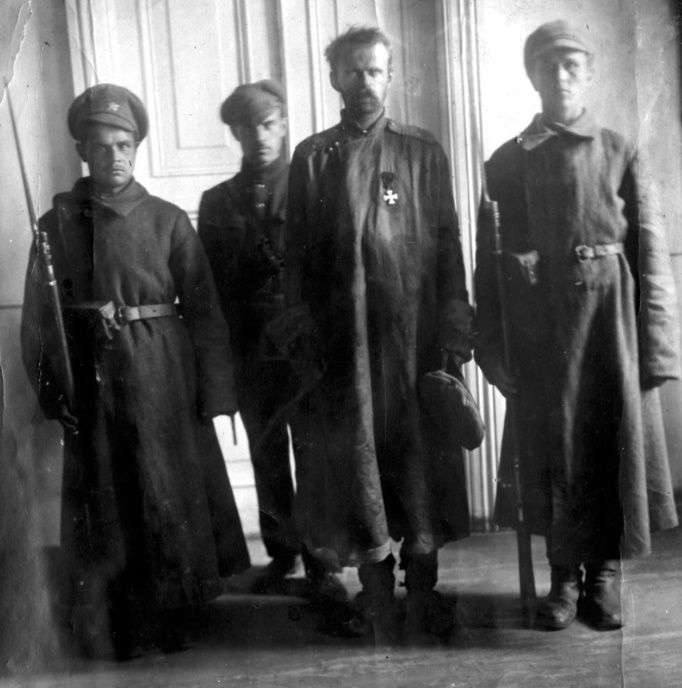
Ungern-Sternberg before his execution, September 1921

Although they had captured Urga, the Red forces failed to defeat the main forces of the Asiatic Division (Ungern's and Rezukhin's brigades). Ungern regrouped and attempted to invade Transbaikal, across the Russo-Mongolian border. To rally his soldiers and local people, he quoted an agreement with Semyonov and pointed to a supposed Japanese offensive that was to support their drive, but neither Semyonov nor the Japanese were eager to assist him.

After several days of rest, the Asiatic Division started its raid into Soviet territory on 18 July. The eyewitnesses Kamil Giżycki and Mikhail Tornovsky gave similar estimates of their numbers: about 3000 men in total. Ungern's troops penetrated deep into Russian territory.

The Soviets declared martial law in areas where the Whites were expected, including Verkhneudinsk (now Ulan-Ude, the capital of Buryatia). Ungern's troops captured many settlements, the northernmost being Novoselenginsk, which they occupied on 1 August. By then, Ungern had understood that his offensive was ill-prepared, and he had heard about the approach of large Red forces. On 2 August 1921, he began his retreat to Mongolia, where he declared his determination to fight communism.

While Ungern's troops wanted to abandon the war effort, head towards Manchuria and join with other Russian émigrés, it soon became clear that Ungern had other ideas. He wanted to retreat to Tuva and then to Tibet. Troops under both Ungern and Rezukhin effectively mutinied and hatched plots to kill their respective commanders.

On 17 August, Rezukhin was murdered. A day later, conspirators attempted to assassinate Ungern. Ungern managed to evade the conspirators twice and retreated to a detachment made up exclusively of local Mongol soldiers. They did not want to take on the mutineers nor side with Ungern, and did not want to kill Ungern himself, so they left him immobilized and fled. The rest of the brigade broke apart during its retreat towards the Chinese border (with the ultimate aim being the Far Eastern Republic). On 20 August, Ungern was captured by a Soviet detachment, led by guerrilla commander Petr Shchetinkin, who was later a member of the Cheka. After a show trial of 6 hours and 15 minutes on 15 September 1921, prosecuted by Yemelyan Yaroslavsky, Ungern was sentenced to execution by firing squad. The sentence was carried out that night in Novonikolayevsk (now Novosibirsk).

When the news of the execution reached the Bogd Khan, he ordered services to be held in temples throughout Mongolia.

== Religious thoughts ==
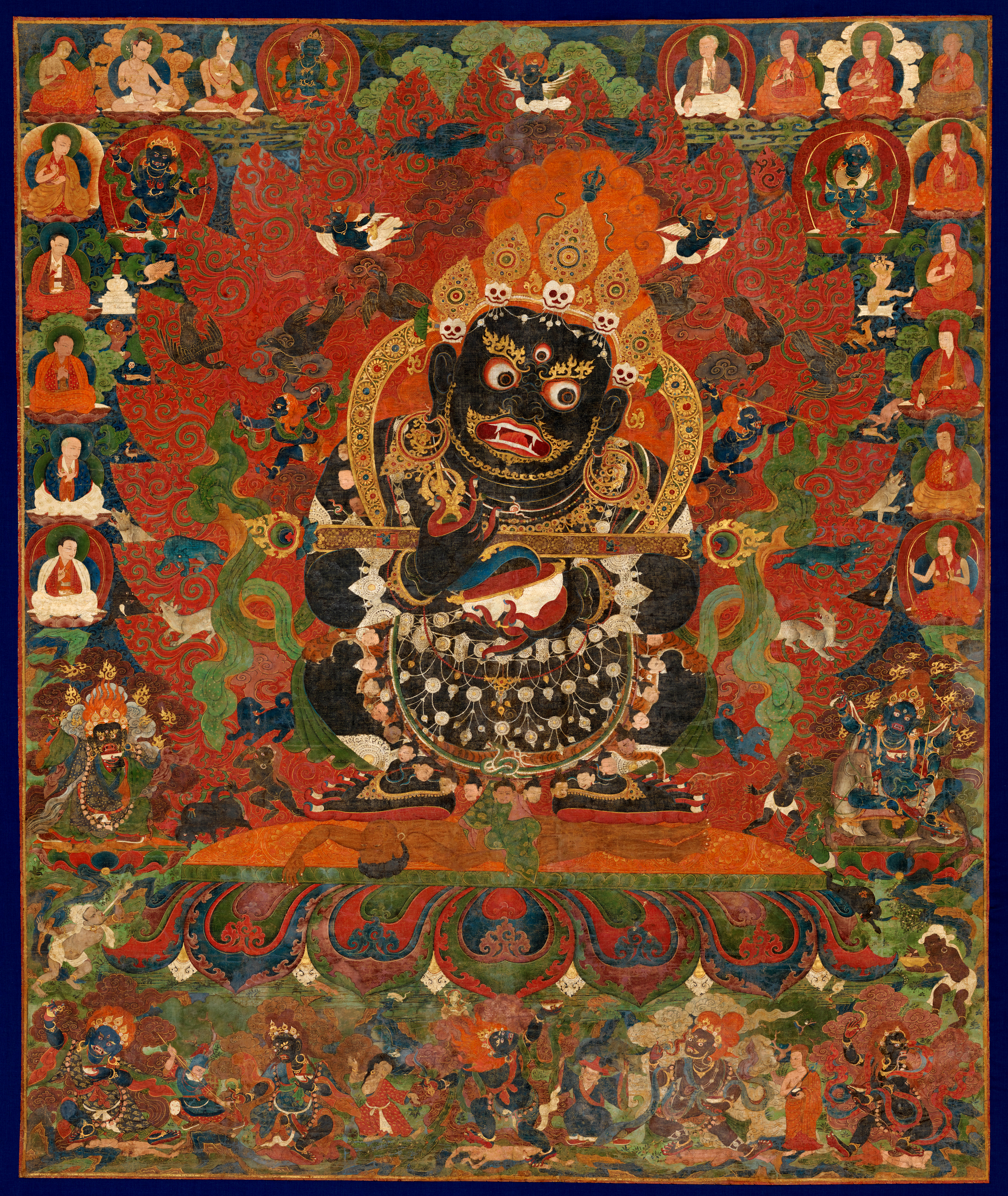
Ungern von Sternberg sought to be recognized as a reincarnation of a Mahākāla.

Although he was raised as a Lutheran, his mysticism and interest in Eastern esotericism led him to explore various religions. He was, however, antisemitic, and likely a reader of the Protocols of the Elders of Zion. He was fascinated by the beliefs and religions of the Far East, such as Buddhism, and his philosophy was an exceptional blend of Russian nationalism with Mongolian and Chinese beliefs. He attempted to be accepted as a reincarnation of Mahākāla, a dharmapāla of Vajrayana Buddhism.

== Legacy ==
=== Geopolitical impact ===
In 2022, John Jennings, a history professor at the United States Air Force Academy, argued that Ungern was one of the worst military leaders ever. His campaigns in Mongolia were, at best, quixotic efforts to re-establish dead empires, marked by brutality and violence directed at not only his own troops but the local populace. They, ironically, made it easier for the Reds to further the reach of Soviet communism, a goal Ungern bitterly opposed. His expedition to Mongolia and conquest of Urga, by driving the Chinese out the country, also eliminated the one force in the region which might have been a match for the Red Army and made it inevitable that the Soviets would invade. The establishment of the Mongolian People's Republic, the first Soviet satellite nation, after the death of the Bogd Khan in 1924 could not have happened without Ungern, Jennings writes.

=== 2020 statue controversy in Estonia ===
In late-2020, members of Blue Awakening, the former youth wing of the Conservative People's Party of Estonia (EKRE) and the current Estonian Nationalists and Conservatives (Estonian: Eesti Rahvuslased ja Konservatiivid, abbr. ERK), formed an NGO called Ungern Khaan with the goal of promoting von Ungern-Sternberg's memory. The group was subsequently granted €45,000 in funding by the three parties in the Estonian coalition government in power at the time, EKRE, the Estonian Centre Party, and Isamaa, to build a statue of von Ungern-Sternberg. After the funding was met with a backlash, the group announced that it would turn down the funding and rely on private donations instead.

=== In popular culture ===
- In 1938, Ungern-Sternberg was the protagonist of a novel published in Germany, Ich befehle! Kampf und Tragödie des Barons Ungern-Sternberg (I Order! The Struggle and Tragedy of Baron Ungern-Sternberg) by Berndt Krauthoff, which often glossed over his more brutal tactics in order to paint him in the best light.
- Ungern-Sternberg is featured in the 1974 graphic novel Corte Sconta detta Arcana by the Italian writer Hugo Pratt.
- The novels of the Russian surrealist writer Victor Pelevin often feature Ungern-Sternberg, most notably his 1996 novel Chapayev and Void.
- Ungern-Sternberg is often mentioned in the novels of the Spanish thriller writer Arturo Pérez-Reverte.
- "Ungern-Sternberg" is a 2001 song by the French punk rock group Paris Violence, which contains the lyrics "Ungern-Sternberg, chevalier romantique / Tu attends la mort comme un amant sa promise" ("Ungern-Sternberg, romantic knight / You wait for death like a lover [waits] for his fiancée").
- Ungern-Sternberg is the main villain in the 2002 video game Iron Storm.

== Works ==
- "Letters captured from Baron Ungern in Mongolia" (1921)

== See also ==
- Timeline of Mongolian history
- Amur Front
