= Battle of Khovd =

Final phase of the 1911 Mongolian Revolution

- Part of the Mongolian Revolution of 1911
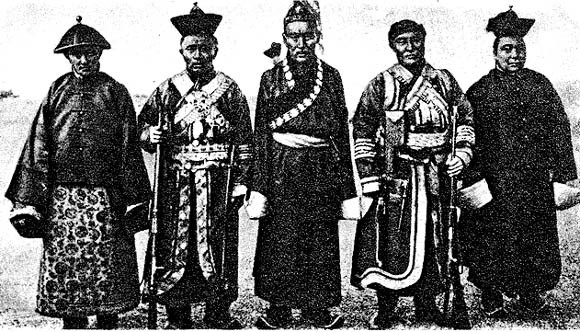
- From left to right: Dörbet Dalai Khan Tumendelgerjav, Zorigt Khan Navaantseren, Jalkhanz Khutagt Damdinbazar, Ja Lama, Zorigt Khan Sodnomjamts of Ulaangom
Date	21 June 1912 – 20 August 1912
Location	Khovd, Mongolia
Result	Mongolian victory; Expulsion of all remaining Qing forces from Western Mongolia; De facto independence of Outer Mongolia

Belligerents
Bogd Khanate of Mongolia; Supported by: Russia	Khovd Prefecture Government (Qing); Supported by: Republic of China

Commanders and leaders
Ja Lama; Manlaibaatar Damdinsüren; Khatanbaatar Magsarjav; Sodnomyn Damdinbazar; Tuvan commander Kuular Lopsan-Cheyzen	Puruan (surrendered)

Strength
5,000	3,000

Casualties and losses
45 deaths	200 deaths

The Battle of Khovd (Note: Mongolian: Ховдыг чөлөөлөх байлдаан, romanized: Khovdiig chuluulukh baildaan, lit. 'Battle for the Liberation of Khovd') was a military confrontation in 1912 during the Mongolian Revolution of 1911. After the battle, the Bogd Khanate of Mongolia expelled all remaining officers and troops of the Qing Empire and took control of the entire Outer Mongolia.

== Background ==
After the Xinhai Revolution in 1911, Russian troops entered Outer Mongolia in October. Local nobles and lamas who supported the 8th Jebtsundamba Khutuktu established a provisional government and on December 29th, Mongolia declared independence from the Qing Empire. Despite independence, much of Western Mongolia remained under Qing military control.

In January 1912, with the support of the Russian consul in Uliastai, Zasagtu Khan ordered the Qing Uliastai General Kuifang and others to hand over all warehouses, silver, silk, military uniforms, and other items to the Mongolian Counselor within seven days, and prepare their own funds to return to their homeland. Kuifang refused to comply but did not take any preventative measures. Finally, the Russian consul intervened, sending a troop of Cossack cavalry under the pretext of protecting Kuifang's safety to forcibly deport him.

== Campaign ==
In the spring of 1912, the Qing garrison at Khovd numbered fewer than 300 men. Forces from Dörbet Oirat under leaders such as Ja Lama and other Outer Mongolian princes planned to seize Khovd and sent envoys to demand surrender. The Qing Amban (high official) in Khovd, Puruan, refused to surrender and recruited about 1,000 Mongol soldiers to strengthen the town’s defenses. The Chinese republican government ordered the Xinjiang governor, Yang Zengxin, the Altai officer Balt, and the military commander at Ili to send troops. Balt dispatched one cavalry battalion; Yang sent one cavalry and one infantry battalion plus three additional units; the Ili commander also sent relief forces.

After Puruan refused to capitulate, Outer Mongolian forces attacked Khovd on 21 June 1912. Initially the attackers hesitated to storm the town, but reinforcements from Khüree (today Ulaanbaatar) arrived to assist. In late July Russian troops together with Outer Mongolian forces renewed the assault. On 2 August, when Altai relief forces approached to within about ten li of Khovd, they encountered more than 3,000 Outer Mongolian troops and were routed. In mid-August another 3,000 Outer Mongolian troops joined the siege of Khovd.

Because Khovd still held out, the Russian consul resorted to deception to remove Puruan from the town. The consul claimed to offer mediation and requested entry to discuss terms; on 20 August Puruan opened the city gates to receive him. The consul then led about 30 Russian soldiers and some 200 Outer Mongolian troops into Khovd and occupied it. By mid-September, Pu, his officers, and roughly 700 Chinese soldiers and civilian merchants from China proper were expelled from Outer Mongolia by forces despatched under the consul's direction.

== Aftermath ==
After this battle, the entire Outer Mongolia was liberated from the former Qing regime. On 11 January 1913, representatives from Mongolia and Tibet signed a treaty in Urga, proclaiming mutual recognition and their independence from China. Mongolia also sent notes of their independence to the following nations of: Belgium, France, British Empire, Japan, German Empire, United States, Denmark, Netherlands and Russia.

== In media ==
- Khatan-Bator, a 1981 Mongolian film about Khatanbaatar Magsarjav
