= Tannu Uriankhai =

1757–1911 Tuvan region of the Qing dynasty

Tannu Uriankhai Таңды Урянхай (Tuvan) 唐努烏梁海 (Chinese)
- 1757–1914
- Left: Flag of the Qing dynasty (1889–1912); Right: Personal banner of the Ambyn-Noyan

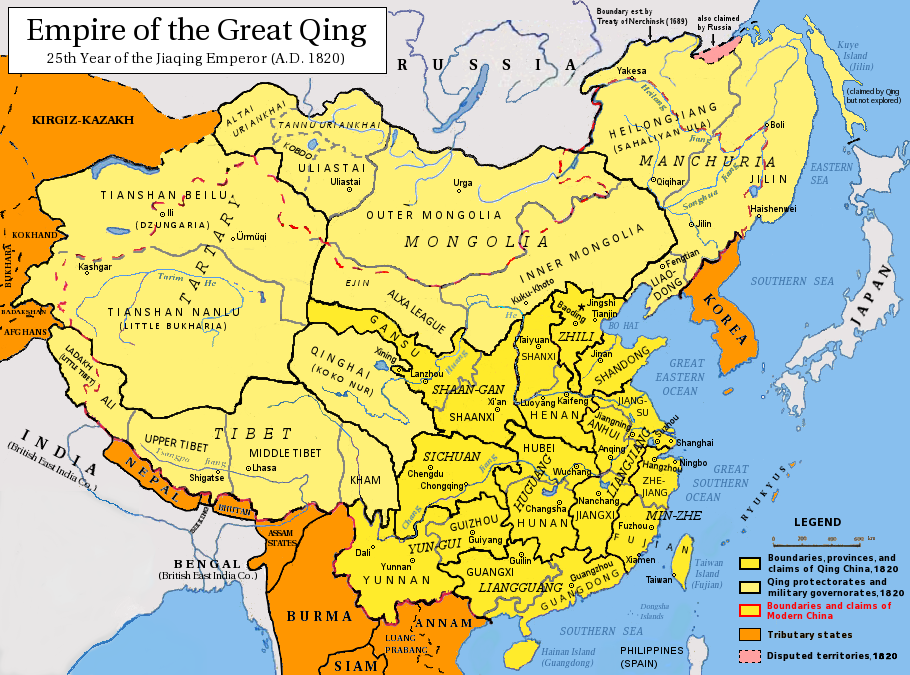
- Tannu Uriankhai within Qing China
- Status: Unorganized autonomous region of the Qing dynasty (1757–1911)
- Common languages: Tuvan, Mongolian, Chinese, Russian
- Religion: Tibetan Buddhism, Shamanism
- Government: Feudal state
- Amban Noyan
  - 1762–1769 (first): Manadzhab
  - 1899–1914 (last): Oyun Kombu-Dorzhu
- History
  - Established: 1757
  - Disestablished: December 1914
| Preceded by | Succeeded by |
| Khotgoid Khanate; Dzungar Khanate | Uryankhay Krai |
- Today part of: Russia; Mongolia

Tannu Uriankhai (Tuvan: Таңды Урянхай, [taŋˈdɤ urʲanˈχaj]; Mongolian: Тагна Урианхай, romanized: Tagna Urianhai, [ˈtʰaɢəɴ ʊrʲæŋˈχæɪ̯]; simplified Chinese: 唐努乌梁海; traditional Chinese: 唐努烏梁海; pinyin: Tángnǔ Wūliánghǎi) was a historical region of the Mongol Empire, its principal successor, the Yuan dynasty, and later the Qing dynasty. The territory of Tannu Uriankhai largely corresponds to the modern-day Tuva Republic of the Russian Federation, neighboring areas in Russia, and a small part of the modern state of Mongolia.

Tannu designates the Tannu-ola Mountains in the region, and Uriankhai was the Mongolian name for the Tuvans (and accordingly their realm), which meant "the people living in the woods" (Chinese: 林中百姓; pinyin: Línzhōng Bǎixìng).

After Mongolia (Outer Mongolia) declared independence from the Qing dynasty and the Republic of China in the early 20th century, the region of Tannu Uriankhai increasingly came under Russian influence and finally became an independent communist state, the Tuvan People's Republic, which was annexed by the Soviet Union in 1944.

Sovereignty over the area has not been officially renounced by the Republic of China since 1949. However, the Mainland Affairs Council issued a statement saying that "Outer Mongolia has never been part of its constitutionally claimed territory."

The 2001 Sino-Russian Treaty of Friendship states that the People's Republic of China (PRC), which controls Mainland China, and the Russian Federation, which controls Tuva, "have no remaining territorial claims". The PRC has official contacts with Tuva and regards it as part of Russia.

== History ==
With the fall of the Yuan dynasty in China, Tannu Uriankhai was controlled by the Oirats (western Mongols, also known as Zungars) until the end of the 16th and early 17th centuries. Thereafter, the history of western Mongolia, and by extension Tannu Uriankhai, is centred around the complex military relations between the Altan Khanate (Khotogoit tribe) and the Oirots, both competing for supremacy in western Mongolia.

The Qing dynasty established its dominion over Mongolia as a result of intervening in a war between the Oirots and the Khalkhas, the dominant tribe in the eastern half of Mongolia. In 1691 the Kangxi Emperor accepted the submission of the Khalkhas at Dolon Nor in Inner Mongolia, and then personally led an army into Mongolia, defeating the Oirots near Ulaanbaatar (the capital of present-day Mongolia) in 1696. Mongolia was now part of the Qing state, and the dynasty's rule over Tuva came not by conquest but by threat: In 1726 the Yongzheng Emperor ordered the Khotogoit Khan Buuvei Beise to accompany a high-ranking Qing official to "inform the Uriankhais of [Qing] edicts" in order to prevent "something untoward from happening".

== Qing administration ==
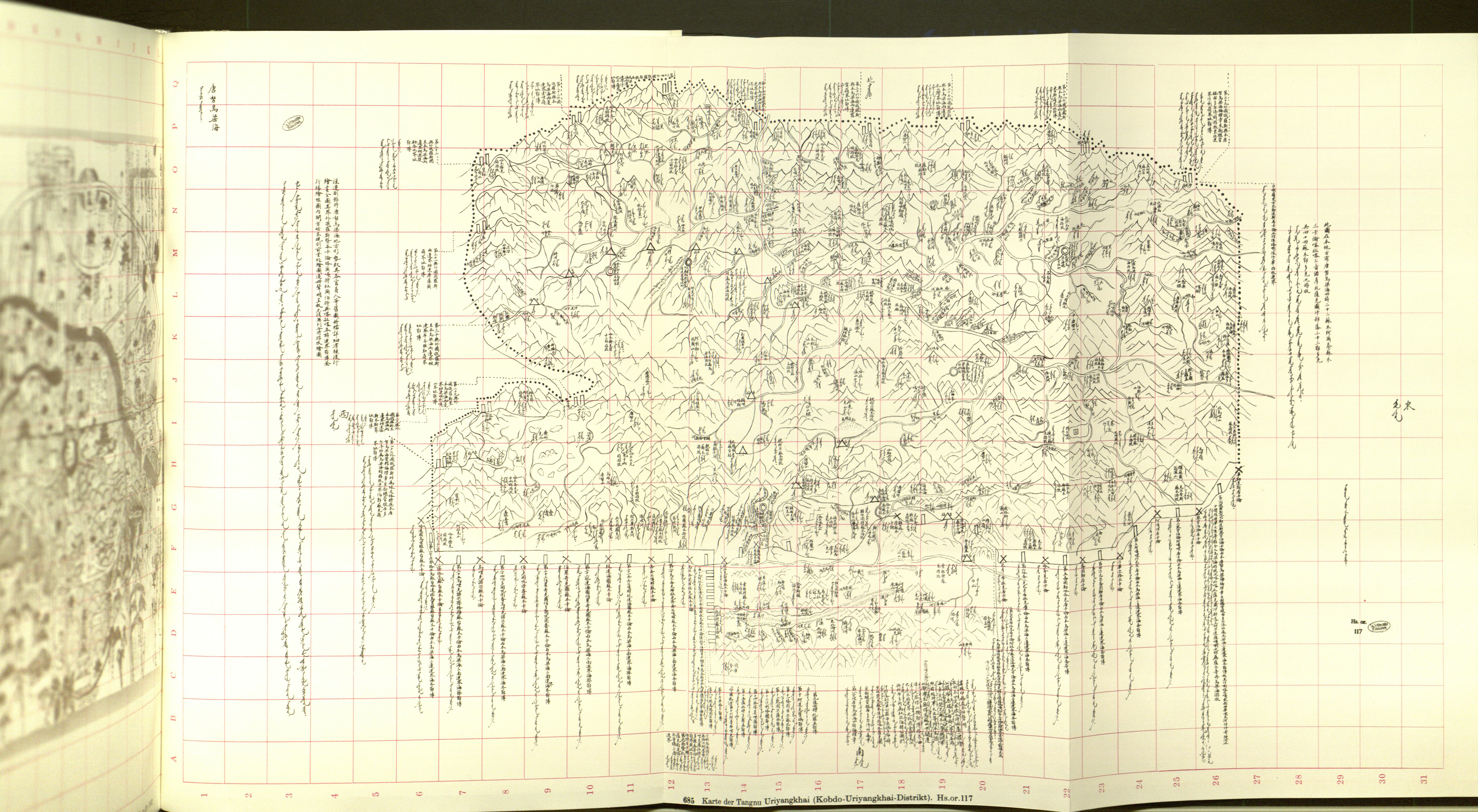
Tannu Uriankhai map under the rule of Qing China, in Mongolian and Chinese

The Tannu Uriankhai were reorganized into an administrative system similar to that of Mongolia, with five banners (khoshun, 旗) and 46 or 47 arrows (sum, 佐領); Chinese and Russian sources differ on the number of khoshuns and sums. Each khoshun was governed by a magistrate (not hereditary) nominally appointed by the Qing military governor at Uliastai. In the latter half of the 18th century, the magistrate of Tannu Banner was placed in charge of the others as governor ("amban-noyon", 四旗總管) in recognition of his military service to the dynasty, until 1872.

- Tannu Banner (唐努旗)
- Salajik Banner (薩拉吉克旗)
- Tojin Banner (托錦旗)
- Khövsgöl Nuur Banner (庫布蘇庫勒諾爾旗、庫蘇古爾旗)
- Khemchik Banner (克穆齊克旗)
- Uliastai General (Amban) 25 sums (烏里雅蘇臺將軍所屬烏梁海二十五佐領)
- Zasagtu Khan 5 sums (札薩克圖汗部所屬烏梁海五佐領)
- Sain Noyan Hošo Prince 13 sums (賽音諾顏部額魯特前旗所屬十三佐領)
- Jebtsundamba Khutugtu's Shabinar 3 sums (哲布尊丹巴呼圖克圖所屬沙比納爾三佐領)

Tannu Uriankhai, as well as Altai and Altainor Uriankhai, occupied a unique position in the Qing dynasty's frontier administration system. If Qing statutes rigorously defined procedures to be followed by the nobles of Outer and Inner Mongolia, Zungaria, and Qinghai for rendering tribute, receiving government stipends, and participating in imperial audiences, they were silent regarding Tannu Uriankhai. After the demarcation of the Sino-Russian border by the Treaty of Kyakhta (1727), the Qing inexplicably placed border guards ("yurt pickets", Mongolian: ger kharuul) south of the Tannu-ola Mountains separating Tannu Uriankai from Outer Mongolia, not along the Sayan Mountains separating the region from Russia. This act was used by 19th-century Russian polemicists, and later Soviet writers, to prove that Tuva had historically been "disputed" territory between Russia and China. The Qing military governor at Uliastiai, on his triennial inspection tours of the 24 pickets under his direct supervision, never crossed the Tannu-ola mountains to visit Uriankhai. When problems occurred meriting official attention, the military governor sent a Mongol from his staff rather than attend to the matter himself.

There is no evidence that Tannu Uriankhai was ever visited by a senior Qing official (except perhaps in 1726). Chinese merchants were forbidden to cross the pickets, a law enforced until the turn of the 20th century. Instead, a few days were set aside for trade at Uliastai when Uriankhai nobles delivered their annual fur tribute to the military governor and received their salaries and other imperial gifts (primarily bolts of satin and cotton cloth) from the emperor. Thus, Tannu Uriankhai enjoyed a degree of political and cultural autonomy unequalled on the Chinese frontier.

== Russian settlement ==
Russian settlement of the region began in 1839 with the opening of two gold mines in the Sayan Mountains; in the following decades, other areas were exploited for mining, mainly in the northern part of Uriankhai. By 1883 the total number of Russian miners there reached 485.

Russian merchants from Minusinsk followed, especially after the Treaty of Peking in 1860, which opened China to foreign trade. They were lured by the "wild prices", as one 19th-century Russian writer described them, that Uriankhais were willing to pay for Russian manufactured goods—cloth, haberdashery, samovars, knives, tobacco, etc. By the end of the 1860s there were sixteen commercial "establishments" (zavedenie) in Tannu Uriankhai. The Uriankhais paid for these goods in livestock-on-the-hoof, furs, and animal skins (sheep, goat, horse, and cattle). But crossing the Sayan Mountains was treacherous; by 1880–85 there were perhaps no more than 50 (or fewer) Russian traders operating in Tannu Uriankhai during the summer, when trade was most active.

Russian colonization followed in 1856 with a sect of Old Believers called the "Seekers of White Waters", seeking a place, which according to their tradition was isolated from the rest of the world by impassable mountains and forests, provided refuge from government authorities, and where the Nikon rites of the Russian Orthodox Church were not practiced.

The formal beginning of Russian colonization in Tannu Uriankhai occurred in 1885 when a merchant received permission from the governor-general of Irkutsk to farm in present-day Turan. Other settlements were formed, and by the first decade of the 20th century there were perhaps 2,000 merchants and colonists.

By the late 1870s and in the 1880s the Russian presence had acquired a political content. In 1878 Russians discovered gold in eastern Uriankhai. There were rumors of fabulous wealth to be gained from this area, and the Russian provincial authorities at Yeniseisk were inundated with petitions from gold miners to mine, and permission to do was granted. Merchants and miners petitioned Russian authorities for military and police protection. In 1886 the Usinsk Frontier Superintendent was established; its primary function was to represent Russian interests in Tannu-Uriankhai with Uriankhai nobles (not Qing officials) and to issue passports to Russians traveling in the area. Over the years the office quietly but steadily claimed the power of government over at least the Russians in the region—taxation, policing, administration, and justice—powers that should have belonged to but were effectively relinquished by the Qing. Shortly after the office of Superintendent was created, the Sibirskaya gazeta brought out a special edition, congratulating the government on its creation, and predicting that all Tannu Uriankhai would someday become part of the Russian state.

== Qing reaction ==
The Qing government was not oblivious to the Russian presence. In the 1860s and 1870s the Uliastai military governor on a number of occasions reported to Peking on the movement of Russians into Uriankhai. Its suspicions were further aroused by other events. At negotiations between it and Russia resulting in the Tarbagatai Protocol of 1864, which defined a part of the Sino-Russian border, the Russian representative insisted that all territory to the north of the Qing frontier pickets fall to Russia. Moreover, the Uliastai military governor obtained a Russian map showing the Tannu-ola Mountains as the Sino-Russian border.

== End of Qing rule ==
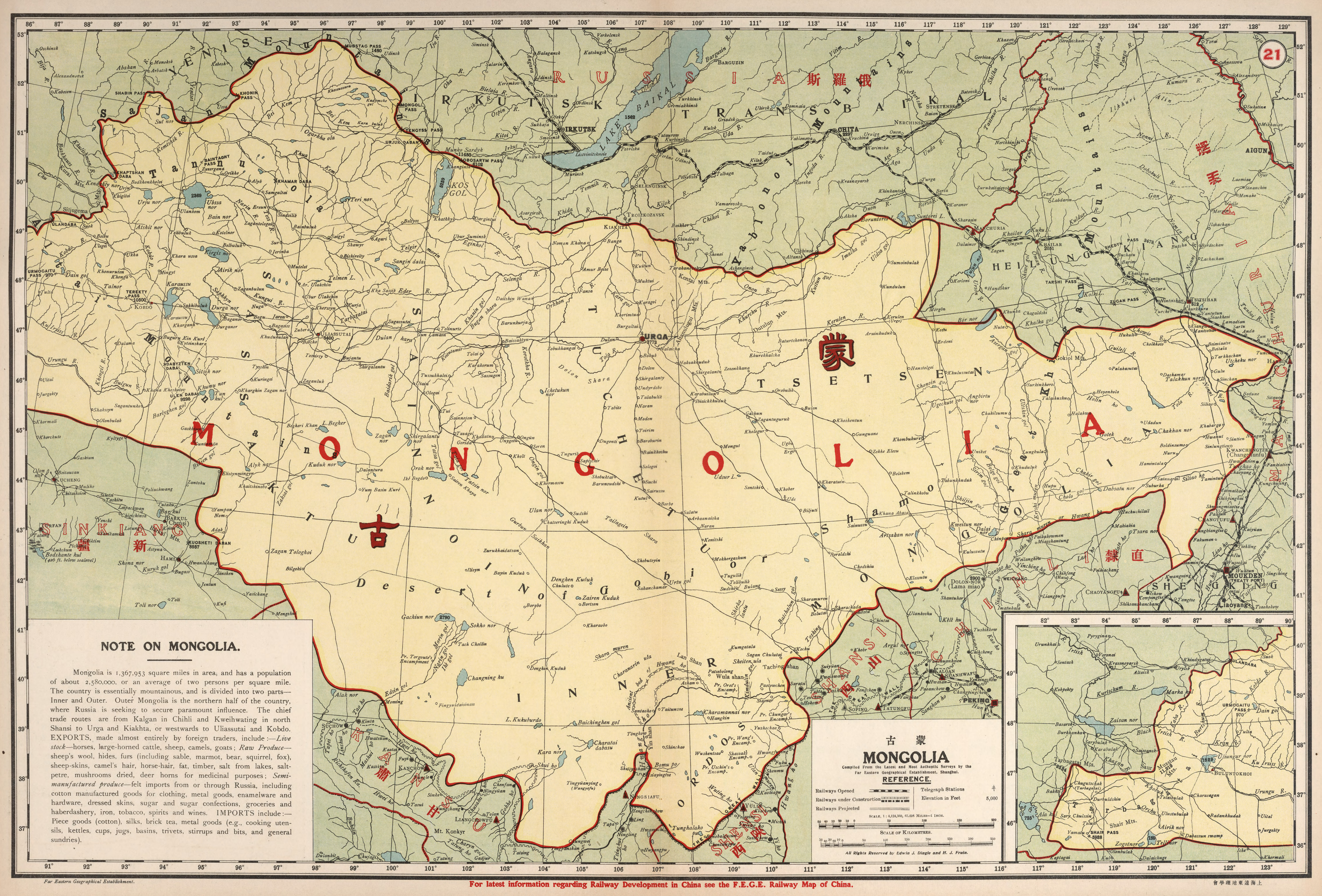
Map of Mongolia including Tannu Uriankhai in 1917

By the early 20th century, the Uriankhai economy had seriously deteriorated, resulting in its people becoming impoverished. The causes were varied: the declining number of fur-bearing animals likely from over-hunting by both Uriankhais and Russians; the declining number of livestock as a result of the export market to Siberia; and periodic natural disasters (especially droughts and plagues), which were detrimental to livestock herds. Additionally, Uriankhai trade with Russians was conducted on credit using a complex system of valuation principally pegged to squirrel skins. As the number of squirrels declined because of over-hunting, the price of goods increased. The Russians also manipulated the trade by encouraging credit purchases at usurious rates of interest. If repayment were not forthcoming, Russian merchants would drive off the livestock of either the debtor or of his relatives or friends, which led to retaliatory raids by the Uriankhai.

The situation worsened when the Han people arrived from China proper. Although the Qing had successfully kept Han traders out of Uriankhai (unlike in other parts of Outer Mongolia and other parts of the frontier), in 1902 they were allowed to cross the border to counter Russian domination of the Uriankhai economy. By 1910, there were 30 or so shops, all branches of Han-owned firms operating in Uliastai. For many reasons—more aggressive selling, easier credit terms, cheaper and more popular goods for sale—the Han people soon dominated commerce just as they had in Outer Mongolia. Soon, the Uriankhais, commoners and princes alike, had accumulated large debts to the Han.

The end of Qing rule in Tannu Uriankhai came quickly. On October 10, 1911, the Xinhai Revolution broke out, and soon afterwards Chinese provinces followed one another in declaring their independence. Mongolia (Outer Mongolia) declared its own independence from China on December 1, and expelled the Qing viceroy four days later.

Uriankhai nobles were divided on their course of political action. The Uriankhai governor, Oyun Kombu-Dorzhu, advocated becoming a protectorate of Russia, hoping that the Russians in turn would appoint him governor of Uriankhai. But the princes of two other banners preferred to submit to the new Bogd Khanate of Mongolia under the theocratic rule of the Jebstundamba Khutukhtu of Urga.

Kombu-Dorzhu sent a petition to the Frontier Superintendent at Usinsk, stating that he had been chosen as leader of an independent Tannu Uriankhai state. He asked for protection and proposed that Russian troops be sent immediately into the state to prevent China from restoring its rule over the region. There was no reply—three months earlier the Tsarist Council of Ministers had already decided on a policy of gradual, cautious absorption of Uriankhai by encouraging Russian colonization; precipitate action by Russia, the Council feared, might provoke China. This position changed as a result of pressure from commercial circles in Russia for a more activist approach, and a Russian sponsored "petition" from two Uriankhai khoshuns in the fall of 1913 requesting to be accepted as a part of Russia. Other Uriankhai khoshuns soon followed suit. In April 1914 Tannu Uriankhai was formally accepted as a protectorate of Russia.

== See also ==
- The Sixty-Four Villages East of the Heilong Jiang is another territory annexed by Russia, claimed by the Republic of China now based in Taiwan.
- Outer Northwest China
- Outer Manchuria
