= Oyun Kombu-Dorzhu =

Tuvan ambyn–noyan

Oyun Ölzey-Ochur oglu Kombu-Dorzhu Оюн Ѳлзей-Очурн оглу Комбу-Доржу 貢布多爾濟
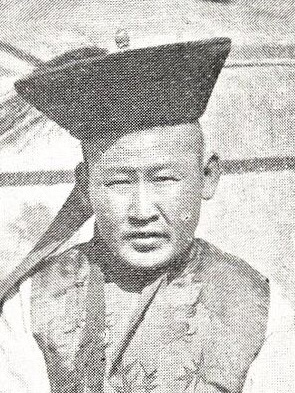

Ambyn–noyan of Tannu Uriankhai and Uryankhay Krai
- Reign: 1899 – 1915
- Predecessor: Ölzey-Ochur
- Successor: Irgit Agbaan-Demchi
- Born: Tannu Uriankhai, Outer Mongolia, Qing China
- Issue: Oyun Sodunam-Balchyr; Liktan-Surun Kombu-Dorzhu oglu
- House: Oyun

Oyun Ölzey-Ochur oglu Kombu-Dorzhu (Tuvan Cyrillic: Оюн Ѳлзей-Очурн оглу Комбу-Доржу, Chinese: 貢布多爾濟) was a Tuvan noble political leader who was the antepenultimate ambyn–noyan of what is now Tuva, ruling over the Qing territory of Tannu Uriankhai through its brief independence and vassalage to the Bogd Khanate of Mongolia, and the Russian protectorate of Uryankhay Krai until 1915. The leader of Uryankhay through the fall of the Qing dynasty, his influence as ambyn–noyan waned as his subordinate noyans became disloyal, notably over the geopolitical question of joining Mongolia or Russia.

== Early life ==
Oyun Kombu-Dorzhu was born to Shindazyn oglu Ölzey-Ochur, the ambyn–noyan of Tannu Uriankhai since 1865, who was a powerful leader that governed interferingly over the nine kozhuuns of the land. Due to the perceived Qing oppression, unrest was growing among the Tuvans at this time; there was even an ill-fated uprising, the Aldan-Maadyr rebellion (or Aldan Durgun) in the Khemchik kozhuun.

== Ambyn–noyan ==
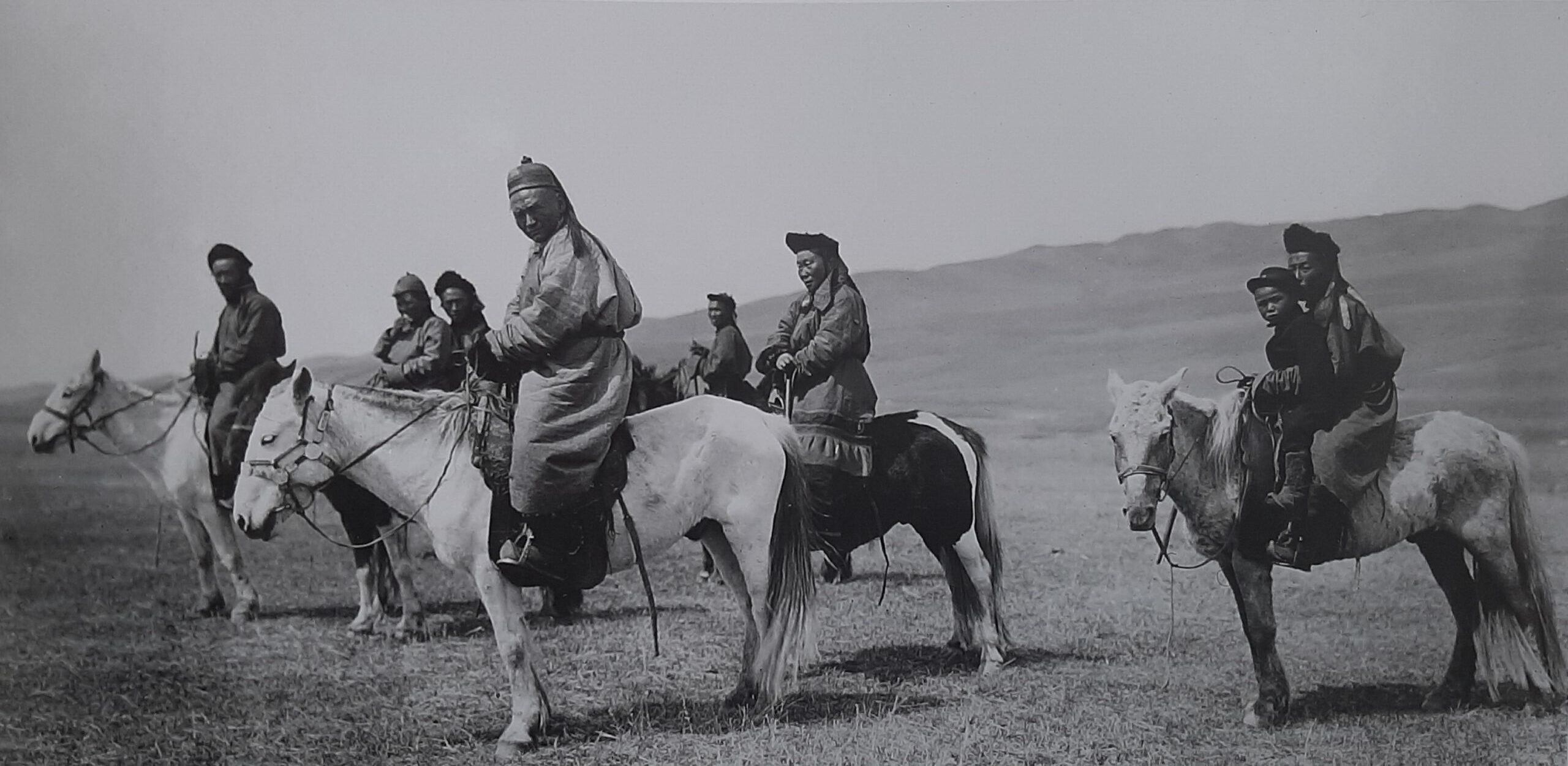
Oyun Kombu-Dorzhu on horseback, 1914.

Kombu-Dorzhu's reign as ambyn–noyan began in 1899, and, unlike that of his father, it was marked by the weakening of his position. A power struggle between him and the noyans of the kozhuuns came about; he eventually became unable to exert authority in any of the kozhuuns besides Oyunnar, which was his own. Khemchik broke away from his rule in 1908. Tannu Uriankhai became independent from China in 1911 as the Xinhai Revolution put an end to the Qing dynasty, coinciding with the secession of Uryankhay's southern neighbour, Outer Mongolia. The noyans' opinions on where to direct Tannu Uriankhai geopolitically were divided between those who wanted to join Mongolia and Russia. Kombu-Dorzhu proposed the establishment of a khanate ruled by him in a January 1912 meeting with Uryankhay's noyans and lamas, however this was not to be. He then looked to Russia for assistance with the aim of reasserting his control over Uryankhay, putting him in opposition to the pro-Mongolian noyans. He made a threat of Russian-backed military force to the noyans of Salchak and Tozhu, which did not stop their declarations of independence and plea to come under the Mongolian state, which was accepted. Khemchik, ruled by Mongush Buyan-Badyrgy, followed suit in submitting to Mongolia. With the pro-Russian side marginalized, the ambyn-noyan, still with the intention of unifying Uryankhay, joined the Bogd Khanate and requested for the return of Salchak, Tozhu, Khemchik and Khövsgöl to him. It then became apparent with Chinese intentions to annex Mongolia and Uryankhay that aligning with Russia was the only viable option. Uryankhay was declared a Russian protectorate—Uryankhay Krai—on April 4, 1914, after which Salchak and Tozhu were brought back to Kombu-Dorzhu's rule. The process of implementing the protectorate took six months.

== Post–rule ==
V. Yu. Grigoriev, the Russian commissar for affairs of Uryankhay Krai, ousted Kombu-Dorzhu from power in August 1915 due to disarray in Oyunnar that he found during his tour of the protectorate in February and May, which he ascribed to Kombu-Dorzhu's "weakness of character and connivance". Kombu-Dorzhu's son, Oyun Sodunam-Balchyr, was elected to succeed him, however he refused to take the position, considering himself to be young and inexperienced—he was 18 years old at the time. This allowed Grigoriev to install the Russophile Irgit Agbaan-Demchi as ruler of Oyunnar and ambyn–noyan of Uryankhay. Kombu-Dorzhu refused to comply with this transfer of power and conspired to retake his lost position, intending to grant it to Sodunam-Balchyr if successful. He fled to Mongolia, and upon his return to Uryankhay he rallied an army of 300 arats at Choduraa to depose Agbaan-Demchi between the 20th and 29 February 1916. Agbaan-Demchi was aware of what was going on; Cossack forces overran and dispersed Kombu-Dorzhu's army, as reported by A. A. Walter, the Russian consul in Uliastai, on May 31, 1916. Kombu-Dorzhu fled once again to Urga, but, in the midst of financial strain and poor relations with the Mongolian authorities, he returned, willing to live under Russian supervision. He made a proposal to have Sodunam-Balchyr appointed as a figurehead ruler. Agbaan-Demchi had arranged for negotiations with his predecessor, which provided an opportunity for Kombu-Dorzhu to have him assassinated; he was shot in late July 1916. It was decided, with the intention of putting an end to the political unrest, that Sodunam-Balchyr, now loyal to Tsarist Russia, would succeed him as ambyn–noyan.

== Family ==
The tamga of the Oyun dynasty

Oyun Kombu-Dorzhu was part of a lineage of Tuvan rulers that began with Dazhy in 1787. His sons were the aforementioned Oyun Sodunam-Balchyr and Liktan-Surun Kombu-Dorzhu oglu (1900–1974), a rich man who was exiled to Chernogorsk for seven years after being tried due to his noble descent.
