= Khatanbaatar Magsarjav =

Mongolian general

Ardyn Khatanbaatar Sandagdorjiin Magsarjav
- Хатанбаатар Магсаржав ᠬᠠᠲᠤᠨ ᠪᠠᠭᠠᠲᠤᠷ ᠮᠠᠭᠰᠠᠷᠵᠠᠪ
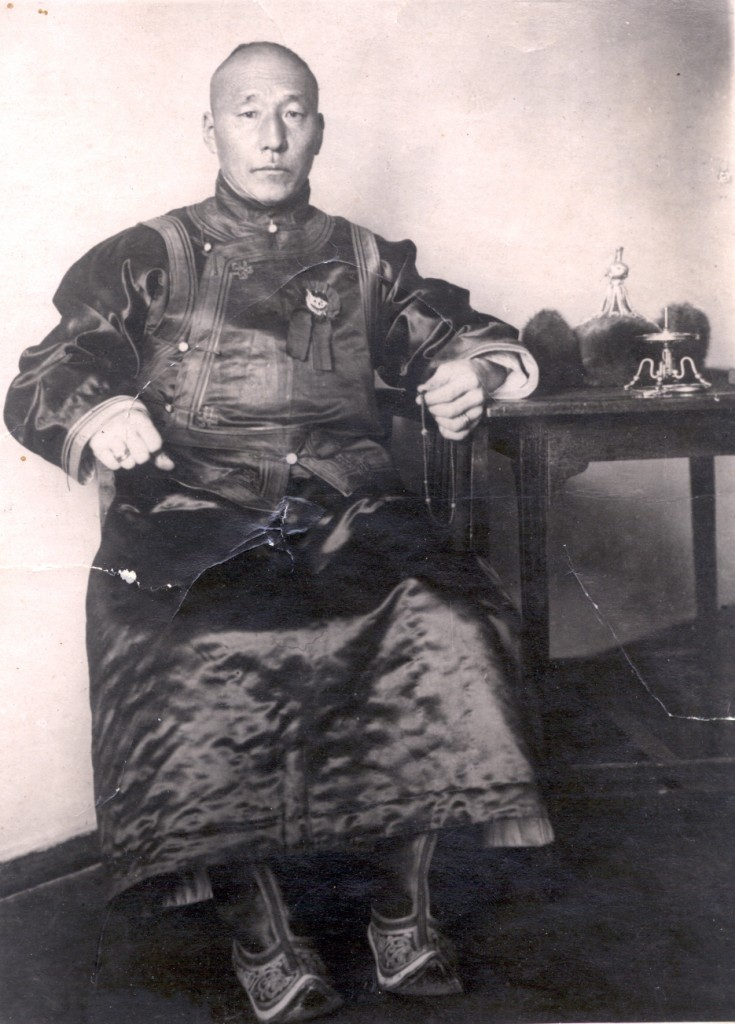
- Magsarjav in the 1920s
- Born: Sandagdorjiin Magsarjav; 10 June 1878; Sain Noyon Khan, Outer Mongolia, China (present day Khutag-Öndör, Bulgan)
- Died: 3 September 1927 (aged 49)
- Military career
- Allegiance: Bogd Khanate of Mongolia (1911–1924); Mongolian People's Republic (1924–1927)
- Service years: 1911–1927
- Conflicts: Battle of Khovd; People's Revolution
- Awards: Order of the Red Banner

Khatanbaatar Magsarjav (Mongolian: Хатанбаатар Магсаржав, ᠬᠠᠲᠤᠨ ᠪᠠᠭᠠᠲᠤᠷ ᠮᠠᠭᠰᠠᠷᠵᠠᠪ, [ˌχaʰtm̩ˈpaˑʰtər ˈmaqsərt͡ɕəw̜]; 10 June 1878 – 3 September 1927) was a Mongolian general and a leading figure in Mongolia's struggle for independence. His contingent of 800 elite Mongol soldiers fought White Russian and Chinese forces over 30 times between 1912 and 1921, without a single defeat. He was appointed as the commander-in-chief by the Bogd Khan in February 1921 after the Bogd Khanate was restored by Roman von Ungern-Sternberg. However, Magsarjav joined the cause of the Mongolian People's Party during the People's Revolution of 1921, and fought White Russian forces in Western Mongolia from July 1921. He served as minister of the army in his later years and received the title Ardyn (Ардын; lit. 'People's') in 1924.

== Early life ==
Magsarjav was born in the Itgemjit banner of Sain Noyon Khan aimag, in what is today the Khutag-Öndör district of Bulgan Province, on 10 June 1878. His father Sandagdorj was part of the banner's nobility. When Magsarjav was 11, his banner duke began teaching him to read and write, and at the age of 16 the banner duke arranged for him to marry a local girl named Tsevegmid, and gifted the young couple some property. Until he was 25, Magsarjav worked for the banner prince, tending his herds or leading camel caravans. Upon his father's death, Magsarjav inherited his noble title. According to Choibalsan's biography of Magsarjav, he then turned to farming, while also occasionally working for the banner office. By 30, his wife and Magsarjav had had ten children, of whom only five survived.

== Military career ==
=== Bogd Khanate of Mongolia ===
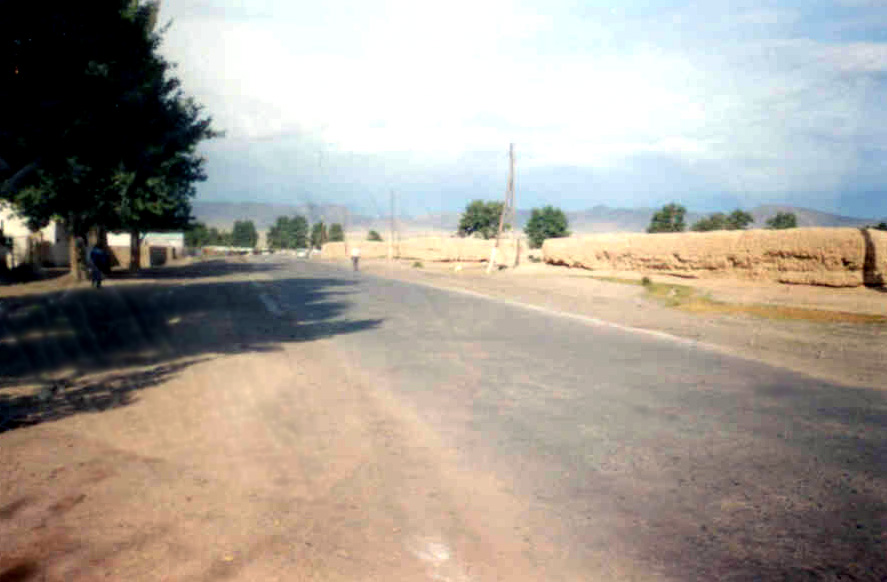
Sangiin Kherem, Qing military fortress, was captured by Magsarjav and Damdinsüren during the Battle of Khovd in 1912.

In 1911, Magsarjav was assigned to Khovd as Mongol military aide to the Manchu amban stationed there. After Mongolia's declaration of independence, Magsarjav transmitted the new government's demand for the ambans' removal. After the amban's refusal, Magsarjav returned to Niislel Khüree to report on the situation. In May 1912, he and Damdinsüren were appointed commander of the army and was dispatched to liberate Khovd. On the night of 20 August 1912, Khovd has been taken by the Mongolian army about 2500 in number. Dambijantsan (Ja Lama), Magsarjav, the Bargut commander Damdinsüren and Khaisan have led the operation. Before that, relief Chinese force sent in from Shar süm/Xinjiang had been annihilated. For their success at Khovd, Damdinsüren received the title Manlaibaatar (forefront hero), while Magsarjav received the title Khatanbaatar.

In the spring of 1913, Magsarjav commanded troops defending the southern border against Chinese incursions near Jingpeng and Dolon Nur in Inner Mongolia. According to Choibalsan, after spending the winter in Mongolia, Magsarjav returned to Inner Mongolia in 1914 to lead operations near Hohhot. However, Russia, fearing a new conflict with Japan, refused to help so the Mongol troops were called back. He was later awarded the Autonomous Mongolian government's "Shar Joloo" medal. In the years that followed, Magsarjav fought against forces under the Bavuujav, who was continually raiding eastern Mongolia. He was later sent to Mongolia's western border. In 1918, Magsarjav was awarded his own banner, which had been carved out his native Itgemjit banner.

=== Chinese Occupation and the 1921 revolution ===
After Chinese troops under General Xu Shuzheng occupied Mongolia in 1919, Magsarjav was imprisoned in Niislel Khuree in mid-1920 on suspicion of having contacts with resistance groups headed by Sükhbaatar. Manlaibaatar Damdinsüren had died in the same prison after suffering torture at the hands of the Chinese. Magsarjav was freed by Baron Ungern after the latter had liberated Niislel Khüree from Chinese troops in February 1921. From March 1921, Magsarjav served as commander-in-chief of all Mongolian troops under Ungern von Sternberg's puppet government. He assisted Baron Ungern in recruiting Mongolian soldiers and participated in the Baron's operation expelling remaining Chinese troops from Mongolia.

In May 1921, Magsarjav left the capital ostensibly to mobilize troops in Uliastai and western provinces to confront the expected invasion of Mongolian partisans (commanded by Sükhbaatar) and Red Army units. However, in July 1921, Magsarjav joined the Russian Reds and Mongolian revolutionaries with his troops. Later that month, Magsarjav's troops unexpectedly encircled and killed Ungern's Buryats and Russian contingents stationed near Uliastai; their commanders ran but were killed later. At night to July 22, under the pretext of destroying Whites, Uliastai was seized, and a considerable part of Russian settlers and refugees were killed.

== Post-revolution ==
Magsarjav continued to fight remnants of Ungern's troops and other White Russian forces in Western Mongolia until mid-1922, He was then appointed Minister of the Western Frontier, awarded the Order of the Red Banner by the RSFSR in 1922, and in December 1922, he became Minister of the Army. He was one of the first to refuse his feudal rank. In 1923 anti-revolutionary resistance groups (made up mostly of troops formally under Ungern command), sought Magsarjav's assistance. Magsarjav instead organized their seizure by the Ministry of Inner Affairs. In 1924, Magsarjav officially joined the Mongolian People's Party, and his title was transformed to Ardyn ("People's") Khatanbaatar Magsarjav. Later that year, he was sent to Moscow on official business. In 1925, he became a candidate member of the People's Party's central committee.

In 1926, Magsarjav became seriously ill and died on 3 September 1927. He is buried in a ger-shaped mausoleum in his hometown, nowadays Khutag-Öndör.

== Khatanbaatar's Elite Khalkha Contingent ==
Across Mongolia, Magsarjav mobilized about 800–2000 soldiers. Out of these, 400 of them were an Elite Commando called Khalkhyn Tsereg (Халхын Цэрэг), meaning 'Khalkha's soldiers'. The Khalkhyn Tsereg were Magsarjav's most trusted contingent and entirely consisted of ethnic Khalha Mongol soldiers, recruits from various regions of Mongolia. This elite commando troops played a major role in most of the military victories of the Mongol army over its enemies whether they would be Chinese, Red Russians or White Russian Guards.

It is said that he personally recruited each of the individuals in the elite commando and thus knew everyone by their place of origin. Though the actual geographic distribution is not well known, it is often speculated that they came mostly from today's Zavkhan, Töv, Khövsgöl, Bulgan, Ömnögovi, Khovd, Arkhangai and Uvs provinces of modern Mongolia.

After each fight or gathering, he would order his troops to gather back at the specific time and location for the next campaign. All of his elite troops would always obey his orders.

From 1912 to 1921, Khatanbaatar led his troops and fought White Russians and Chinese more than 30 times. He defeated Chinese troops many times, and later managed by ruse to defeat some White Russians (including well-known general Bakich). Small groups of the Whites were destroyed.

At the same time, Magsarjav with his detachment of 400 men very carefully pursued large White troop formations retreating from western Mongolia to Xinjiang: he waited for weapons from the Reds, as well as reinforcements. The majority of the contingents of White Russians in western Mongolia were defeated with or without the support of Soviet Red Army, with most retreating to Xinjiang.

Khatanbaatar's fame of bravery and success were broadly publicized during the time of pro-communist rule in Mongolia, while negative sides of his activity were concealed.

== In popular media ==
- The 1981 Mongolian film titled Khatan-Bator directed by Jigjidsuren Gombojav (by Mongol Kino).
- The 2013 Remake titled Khaatanbaatar Magsarjav by MobiCom and Soyombo Films.
- Lost Horizon
- Huns of the Steppe (1976)
- Bogd Khaan
