= Khatan-Bator =

Khatan-Bator Ardyn Khatan-Bator
- Directed by: Jigjidsuren Gombojav
- Produced by: S.Udvag; Jigjidsuren Gombojav
- Starring: E.Erdenbulgan; R.Lorzambat; L.Nerendamba
- Music by: G.Deren
- Distributed by: Mongol Kino
- Release date: August 13, 1981
- Country: Mongolia
- Languages: Mongolian; Chinese; Russian

Khatan-Bator is a two-part Mongolian language biopic film based on the life of Khatanbaatar Magsarjav. Khatanbaatar was a Mongolian General who overthrew the Manchurian Forces in Mongolia led by the Amban Chinese occupation of Urga. The film was directed by Jigjidsuren Gombojav and produced by Mongol Kino. It was submitted to the 12th Moscow International Film Festival.

== Synopsis ==
Story is based in the life of Khatanbaatar Magsarjav, a Mongolian general and a leading figure in Mongolia's struggle for independence. His contingent of 800 elite Mongol soldiers fought White Russian and Chinese forces over 30 times between 1912 and 1921, without a single defeat. He served as acting prime minister from February 15, 1921, to March 13, 1921, under Roman Ungern von Sternberg's puppet regime and later fought the baron forces.

== Cast and Staffs ==
- Director: G.Jigjidsuren
- Photographer: L. Sharavdorj, G.Tseren
- Author: S.Udval, G.Jigjidsuren
- Composer: Z.Hangal
- Songwriter: B.Sambuu
- Screenplay: D.Badamtseren
- Writers: D.Tumenbayar, D.Didid, T.Narantsetseg

=== Cast ===
- E. Erdenebulgan as Khatanbaatar Magsarjav
- R. Lorzambat as Damdin Sukhbaatar
- L. Nerendamba as Manlaibaatar Damdinsuren (part-1)
- R. Dorjbat as Sukhbaatar
- Anatoly Tkalcher as Baron Ungern
- Demberen Sedor - Grigory Semyonov
- S.Anatoli- Bakerk
- A. Ochirbat as Togmind

Cameo roles (Part - I and II )

- D. Altangeren as Toogoo
- N. Chegmed as the Bogd Khan
- Nikoliai Magnikov as Eshetenkihn
- Boris Andrev as Andriei V.Burdokov
- P. Jamsranjav as Amban San-dowa (A Chinese official)
- A. Avirmed as Darbzab
- D. Chimed-Osor as Ovgon
- S. Renden as G. Soyn
- S. Seded as Dermeen
- R. Eldorj as Capt. Tien Shi Hung (Beiyang Army)
- Z. Jarantav - Beiyang Army
- S. Medndee - Beiyang Army
- S. Dorj - Beiyang Army
- B. Goboj - Amban's servant
- Yuri Martinov - Russian commander
- N. Smorchkov - Russian Soldier
- Z. Dedendambaa- Buryat Soldier
- Cookie or Altangerel-Dashtseleg
- Mr. Gangen Suwen
- Bogd Jebtsundamba Khutuktu - The Tsegmah of Najat
- Jargal - Nysing
- Daruz - Choir
- D.Davaajav - Gunjchinhorloo
