= Jinshun =

Jinshun (金順; d. 1886), courtesy name Hefu (和甫), was a Qing dynasty general of the Irgen Gioro clan from Girin Ula region and a member of the Manchu Bordered Blue Banner.

== Biography ==
Jinshun distinguished himself through his military service fighting against the Taiping Rebellion, for which he was awarded Baturu, the Manchu warrior title. He later took part in the suppression of the Dungan Revolt (1862–1877) and served as deputy commander under the Imperial Commissioner Zuo Zongtang. Commanding major Qing forces, he played an important role in the reconquest of Xinjiang from rebel forces. Over the course of his career, Jinshun served as Banner Generals of Uliastai and Ili, and was granted the hereditary noble rank of tuwašara hafan. In 1886, while returning to the imperial capital, he died of illness at Suzhou, Gansu. The Qing court posthumously honored him with the title Taizi Taibao (太子太保, "Grand Protector of Crown Prince") and the posthumous name Zhongjie (忠介, "Loyal and Upright").

His younger brother Lianshun (連順) served as the General of Uliastai.
