= Lianshun =

Lianshun (連順, 1844–1906), courtesy name Jie'an (捷安), was a Qing official and military commander of the Irgen Gioro clan from Girin Ula and a member of the Manchu Bordered Blue Banner.

== Biography ==
Lianshun accompanied his elder brother Jinshun on the Qing campaigns in Xinjiang, where he earned military distinction. He later served as Commander of Jinzhou (金州） Banner Troops, gaining a reputation for honest administration and benevolent governance; a commemorative stele was erected in his honor by the local population (連公德政碑).

During the First Sino-Japanese War (1894–1895), Lianshun commanded the defense of Jinzhou against Japanese forces led by Oyama Iwao. Despite having only a small garrison, he and the reinforcements under Xu Bangdao (徐邦道) repeatedly repelled Japanese assaults. After the city walls were breached, Qing troops fought a fierce urban battle before being forced to withdraw to Lüshunkou (旅順口) due to overwhelming enemy numbers. Following the fall of Jinzhou, Lianshun was stripped of office but allowed to remain in service. He was later reinstated and served as Ministerial Adviser （參贊大臣）, Imperial Resident and Administrative Minister at Khüree (庫倫辦事大臣), and General of Uliastai. He eventually reached to the prestigious position of Imperial Guard Minister (内大臣).
