= Museum of Zavkhan Province =

Museum in Uliastai, Zavkhan, Mongolia

- Завхан Аймгийн Музей
- Established: 1924
- Location: Uliastai, Zavkhan, Mongolia
- Coordinates: 47°44′30.6″N 96°50′47.3″E
- Type: museum
- Collection size: 10,300

The Museum of Zavkhan Province (Mongolian: Завхан Аймгийн Музей) is a museum in Uliastai, Zavkhan Province, Mongolia.

== History ==
The museum was originally established in 1924. In 1938, it was changed to a House of Regional Studies. In 2024, to mark the museum's 100th anniversary, it organized the Mysterious World exhibition.

== Exhibitions ==
The museum has a total exhibition of 10,300 artifacts.

== See also ==
- List of museums in Mongolia
