= Uliastai General =

General of Qing Dynasty

Location of the Uliastai General's area of jurisdiction, 1820

The Uliastai General or General of Uliastai (Mongolian: Улиастайн жанжны газар; Chinese: 烏里雅蘇臺將軍), formerly known as Deputy General of the Left (Chinese: 定邊左副將軍), was the highest military officer of China's Qing dynasty in Outer Mongolia, Tannu Uriankhai and Kobdo. It was established in 1733, and the first general was Ts῾ering The title was abandoned at the end of 1911 due to the de facto independence of Outer Mongolia.

== History ==
The General was appointed for the expedition against the Mongol Dzungar people, and the first officer to bear this title was Prince Ts῾ering of the Khalkha Mongols, who commanded the four divisions of the Khalkha tribe. During the reign of Qianlong, the Qing army won the Dzungar–Qing Wars. The Deputy General became the stationed minister in charge of the affairs of the four divisions of Khalkha, Kobdo, and Tannu Uriankhai. Due to its long presence in the city of Uliastai, it also became known as Uliastai General.

After the Wuchang Uprising in 1911, the Bogd Khanate of Mongolia declared its independence and sent troops to attack Uliastai. The last general, Kui Fang, was forced to resign and was evacuated from Uliastai in December 1911.

In 1912, the government of the Republic of China once intended to send troops to recover Outer Mongolia.

== Jurisdiction ==
The military areas under the jurisdiction of the Uliastai General include Tüsheet Khan and 3 more divisions of the Khalkha tribe in Outer Mongolia, as well as Tannu Uriankhai and Kobdo. Its land is roughly equivalent to most of today's Mongolia (except Dariganga Mongols and other places); the Republic of Tuva in Russia, the entire territory of the Altai Republic, the southeastern part of the Altai Krai, the southern part of the Khakassia Republic and Kemerovo; the north of the Altay Prefecture in Xinjiang, China; and the eastern corner of East Kazakhstan Region, Kazakhstan.

== See also ==
- Amban
