= Jigjidsuren Gombojav =

Mongolian film director and screenwriter (born 1942)

Jigjidsüren Gombojav
- Born: Jigjidsüren Gombojav; 10 January 1942; Bayan Sum, Mongolian People's Republic
- Occupations: Film director, screenwriter
- Spouse: Tsetseg Damba
- Awards: Merited Artist of Mongolia (2003); People's Artist of Mongolia (2007); D. Natsagdorj Literature Award (2011)

Jigjidsüren Gombojav (Mongolian: Гомбожавын Жигжидсүрэн) is a Mongolian film director and screenwriter. His films include The First Steps (Анхны Алхам) (1974), The Legend of Mother Oasis (Эх Бүрдийн Домог) (1975), Khatan-Bator (Хатанбаатар) (1981), Tears of the Rock Monument (Хүн Чулууны Нулимс) (1990), Warm Ashes (Бүлээн Нурам) (1991), and Traces of Existence (Амин Мөр) (1992). He was awarded the highest honor in Mongolia for artists, the People's Artist of Mongolia, in 2007 for his contribution to Mongolian cinema and television, and the highest literature award in Mongolia, D. Natsagdorj Literature Award, in 2011 for his documentary film about the poet D. Natsagdorj.

== Life ==
Jigjidsüren Gombojav was born in a place called Uzuur-Shand in today's Bayanjargalan sum of Töv Province of Mongolia, to a Khiyad-Borjigin aristocratic Khalkha Mongol family from what is then known as Darhan Zasag banner from Tüsheet Khan aimag, and was brought up in Ulaanbaatar, which was under the jurisdiction of the same banner. After graduating from high school in Ulaanbaatar, Jigjidsüren worked as an assistant director in the "Mongol Kino" studio under the supervision of the directors Jigjid Dejid and Chimed-Osor Dendev. In 1962 he was admitted to the State Institute of Cinematography (a.k.a. VGIK, now the Gerasimov Institute of Cinematography). He studied film directing under Lev Kuleshov and screenwriting under Aleksei Kapler.

== Career ==
After graduating from the State Institute of Cinematography, Jigjidsüren returned to the "Mongol Kino" film studio to be hired as a film director. He debuted his directorial career with a feature film The First Steps which was released in 1970. The film won the Special Prize at the Tashkent International Film Festival. The Legend of Mother Oasis won the main prize at the Karlovy-Vary International Film Festival in 1976. He co-directed the film with Buntar Jamyan. Khatan-bator, the drama Jigjidsüren directed and co-wrote with S.Udval, was included in the competition program of the Moscow International Film Festival in 1981. His directorial work Prologue of the Undeclared War was included in the competition program of the Moscow International Film Festival in 1985. Jigjidsüren worked as a film director and artistic director at the "Mongol Kino" film studio until 1992. Since then he has produced several feature films under his private film studio "Hiimori-Film". From 1996 he worked as the programming director at the Mongolian National Television (now Mongolian National Broadcaster) and also served on its executive committee. He co-wrote with his spouse "The Encyclopedia of Mongolian Cinema" in 2005. The encyclopedia includes chronicles and descriptions of films made in Mongolia from 1935 to 2000, and is considered to be the only comprehensive reference on Mongolian cinema. He also wrote a biographical and historical account of Mongolian cinema in his book "55:25 The Kids of Shadow Art". In addition to activities in cinema and television, since the 1980s Jigjidsüren taught at higher education institutions in Mongolia, including the University of Culture and Arts, and the Institute of Cinematography of Mongolia.

== Filmography ==
Year	English title	Original title	Role	Country	Notes
1970	The First Steps	Анхны Алхам	Director	Mongolian People's Republic	Student film
1972	The Beginning	Эхлэлт	Director	Mongolian People's Republic	
1973	The Gem of the Gobi	Говийн Нүдэн	Director, Co-screenwriter	Mongolian People's Republic	
1975	The Legend of Mother Oasis	Эх Бүрдийн Домог	Co-director	Mongolian People's Republic	
1976	Human Life	Хүний Амь	Director, Co-screenwriter	Mongolian People's Republic	
1978	Stupa Blue Mountains	Сувраган Цэнхэр Уулс	Director, Co-screenwriter	Mongolian People's Republic	
1981	Khatan-bator (Khatanbaatar)	Хатанбаатар	Director, Co-screenwriter	Mongolian People's Republic	
1981	The People's Khatan-bator	Ардын Хатанбаатар	Director, Co-screenwriter	Mongolian People's Republic	
1983	Sun's Foal	Нарны Унага	Director, Co-screenwriter	Mongolian People's Republic	
1984	The Prologue of the Undeclared War	Зарлаагүй Дайны Оршил	Director	Mongolian People's Republic	
1985	Petition To the Front	Фронтод Явах Өргөдөл	Director	Mongolian People's Republic	
1986	Tree Sprouted in Autumn	Намар Нахиалсан Мод	Director, Co-screenwriter	Mongolian People's Republic	
1989	Golden Falcon	Алтан Шонхор	Director, Co-screenwriter	Mongolian People's Republic	
1990	Tears of the Rock Monument	Хүн Чулууны Нулимс	Director	Mongolian People's Republic	
1991	Warm Ashes	Бүлээн Нурам	Director	Mongolian People's Republic	
1992	The Traces of Existence	Амин Мөр	Director	Mongolian People's Republic	
1992	Beast	Араатан	Director	Mongolian People's Republic	
1992	Vengeance	Өс Хонзон	Director	Mongolia, China	
1995	White Foal in the Dreams	Зүүдний Цагаан Унага	Director, Co-screenwriter	Mongolia	
1996	The Bank's Ruin	Банкны Сүйрэл	Director, Co-screenwriter	Mongolia	
1997	The Descendant of the Great Khaan	Их Хааны Удам	Director, Co-screenwriter	Mongolia	
2000	The Legend of the White Milk	Цагаан Сүүний Домог	Director	Mongolia	

== Sources ==
- Gombojav, Jigjidsüren; Damba, Tsetseg (2005). The Encyclopedia of Mongolian Cinema. SodPress. ISBN 9789992990391.
- Gombojav, Jigjidsüren; Damba, Tsetseg (2015). The Encyclopedia of Mongolian Cinema II. Munhiin Useg. ISBN 9789997329325.
- Gombojav, Jigjidsüren (2017). 55:25 Kids of the Shadow Art. BCI. ISBN 978-99978-0-275-0.
- Grøn, Nis (2016). World Cinema Beyond the Periphery: Developing Film Cultures in Bhutan, Mongolia, and Myanmar. PhD Dissertation, Lingnan University.
