= Uliastai =

Provincial capital of Zavkhan Province, Mongolia

Uliastai Улиастай ᠤᠯᠢᠶᠠᠰᠤᠲᠠᠢ
- District
- Uliastai District; Улиастай сум ᠤᠯᠢᠶᠠᠰᠤᠲᠠᠢᠰᠣᠮᠣ
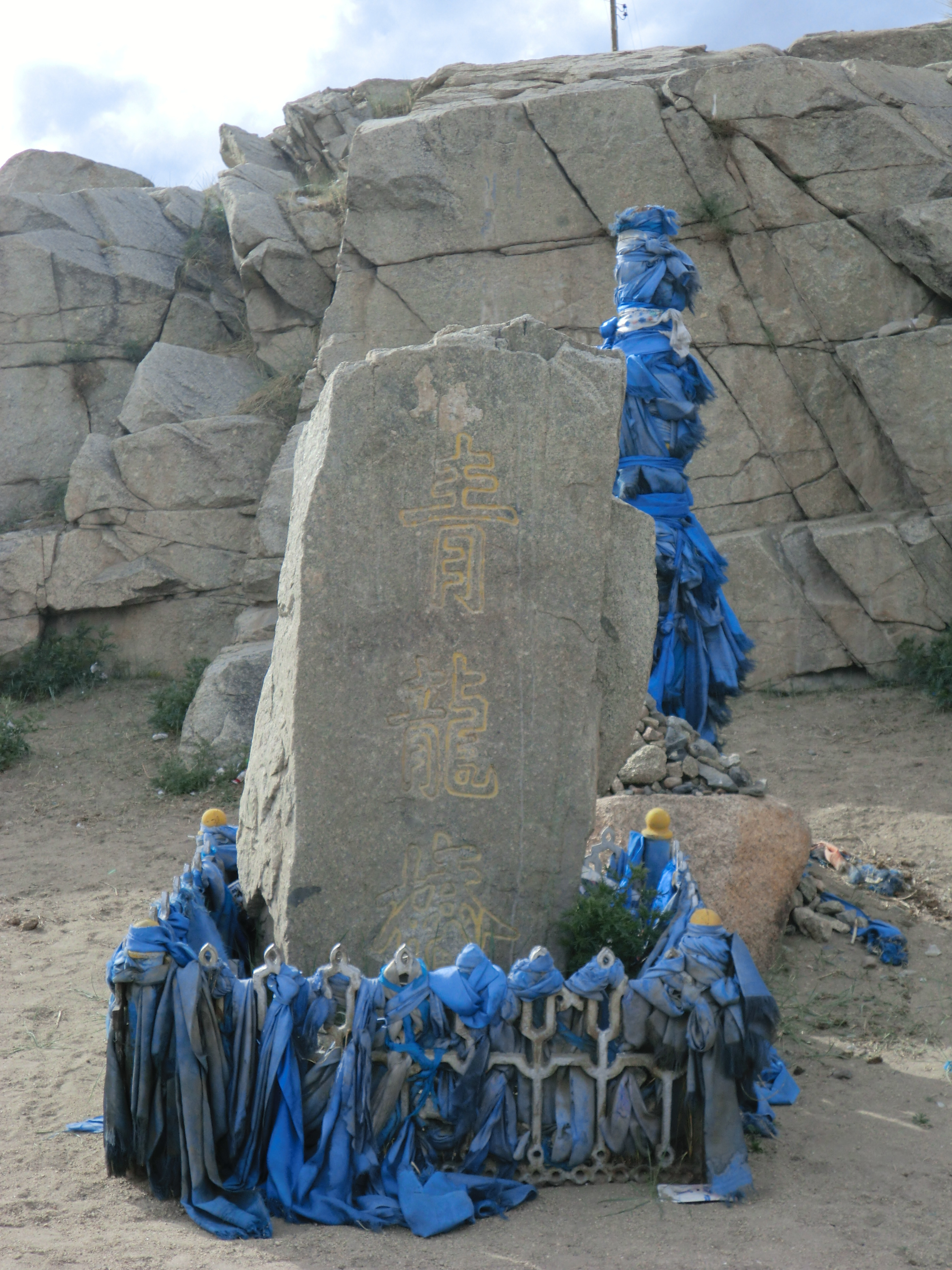
- Manchurian Stone near Chigestei Gol. The Chinese characters translate to, "Azure Dragon Bridge"

- Location within Mongolia
- Coordinates: 47°44′34″N 96°50′36″E
- Country: Mongolia
- Province: Zavkhan Province
- Founded: 1733

Area
  - Total: 32.04 km^{2} (12.37 sq mi)
- Elevation: 1,753 m (5,751 ft)

Population (2025)
  - Total: 15,761
  - Density: 491.9/km^{2} (1,274/sq mi)
- Time zone: UTC+8 (UTC + 8)
- Area code: +976 (0)146
- Climate: BSk

Uliastai (Mongolian: Улиастай; ᠤᠯᠢᠶᠠᠰᠤᠲᠠᠢ "Place with Poplars"), also spelled Uliyasutai or Oulia-Sontai, and sometimes known as Javkhlant, is a city in Mongolia located in the western part of the country and 1,115 kilometres (693 mi) from the capital Ulaanbaatar. Uliastai is the capital of Zavkhan Province and was the 10th most populous city in the country with a population of 24,276 (2000 census). However, recent estimates have the city's population at 16,240 (2006 est.) making it the 16th most populous city in Mongolia.

Uliastai is located in a river valley where the Chigestai and Bogdiin Gol rivers meet, and is surrounded by mountains on all sides. It is one of the most remote aimag capitals in Mongolia. Uliastai city has sum (district) status and forms an enclave within the surrounding Aldarkhaan sum.

== History ==
Alongside Khovd, Uliastai is one of the oldest settlements in Mongolia, and has long been an important center of caravan trade even into the 20th century. It was connected by camel caravan routes with Urga (now Ulaanbaatar) in the east, Khovd in the west, Barkol and other points in Xinjiang in the southwest, and Hohhot in the southeast.

The city was founded as a military garrison by the Manchus in 1733 during the Qing rule of Mongolia. Uliastai was the de facto capital of Outer Mongolia, as the Qing Amban, the Governor General, located its office in Uliastai to keep eye on the Khalkh Mongols to the east and the Oirad Mongols west of the Khangai mountains. Thus, the position was also known as the Uliastai General. At its peak, the fortress held up to 3500 soldiers and was surrounded by a Chinese trading quarter, or "Maimaicheng".

In March 1755, a Qing dynasty army departed from Uliastai as the vanguard in the Qianlong Emperor's final push against the Dzungar Khanate to the south west.

During the Outer Mongolian Revolution of 1911 the Military Governor of Uliastai, his staff, and military guards, fled the Uliastai fortress under the protection of Cossack troops. Traces of Manchu rule can still be seen in Uliastai: the stone remnants of the governors fortress near the Bogdiin river are a short walk from town, the shackles and torture devices used by the Manchu are on display in the History Museum, and a khatag-laden stone near the central roundabout is carved with Chinese characters.

== Climate ==
Uliastai experiences a cold semi-arid climate (Köppen: BSk) with long, dry, very cold winters and short, warm summers.

Climate data for Uliastai, elevation 1,759 m (5,771 ft), (1991–2020 normals, extremes 1990–2023)
| Month | Jan | Feb | Mar | Apr | May | Jun | Jul | Aug | Sep | Oct | Nov | Dec | Year |
|---|---|---|---|---|---|---|---|---|---|---|---|---|---|
| Record high °C (°F) | 1.1 (34.0) | 10.2 (50.4) | 15.5 (59.9) | 24.9 (76.8) | 29.6 (85.3) | 32.7 (90.9) | 35.8 (96.4) | 34.2 (93.6) | 27.5 (81.5) | 25.0 (77.0) | 13.2 (55.8) | 4.0 (39.2) | 35.8 (96.4) |
| Mean daily maximum °C (°F) | −15.6 (3.9) | −10.5 (13.1) | −0.2 (31.6) | 10.0 (50.0) | 16.3 (61.3) | 22.6 (72.7) | 24.5 (76.1) | 22.2 (72.0) | 16.2 (61.2) | 7.3 (45.1) | −4.4 (24.1) | −13.3 (8.1) | 6.3 (43.3) |
| Daily mean °C (°F) | −22.9 (−9.2) | −18.7 (−1.7) | −8.9 (16.0) | 2.6 (36.7) | 9.1 (48.4) | 15.2 (59.4) | 17.2 (63.0) | 14.6 (58.3) | 8.1 (46.6) | −0.5 (31.1) | −11.9 (10.6) | −19.8 (−3.6) | −1.3 (29.6) |
| Mean daily minimum °C (°F) | −28.9 (−20.0) | −25.9 (−14.6) | −16.5 (2.3) | −3.9 (25.0) | 1.4 (34.5) | 7.8 (46.0) | 10.5 (50.9) | 7.9 (46.2) | 0.6 (33.1) | −7.0 (19.4) | −18.1 (−0.6) | −25.2 (−13.4) | −8.1 (17.4) |
| Record low °C (°F) | −44.2 (−47.6) | −42.3 (−44.1) | −37.2 (−35.0) | −27.7 (−17.9) | −13.0 (8.6) | −4.8 (23.4) | −0.1 (31.8) | −3.2 (26.2) | −14.3 (6.3) | −29.5 (−21.1) | −36.7 (−34.1) | −40.6 (−41.1) | −44.2 (−47.6) |
| Average precipitation mm (inches) | 3.3 (0.13) | 3.5 (0.14) | 4.2 (0.17) | 9.0 (0.35) | 17.0 (0.67) | 34.1 (1.34) | 60.2 (2.37) | 45.0 (1.77) | 20.5 (0.81) | 7.7 (0.30) | 5.4 (0.21) | 4.1 (0.16) | 214 (8.42) |
| Average precipitation days (≥ 1.0 mm) | 1.7 | 1.6 | 2.0 | 2.5 | 3.6 | 6.0 | 8.8 | 7.5 | 3.6 | 2.3 | 2.3 | 2.0 | 43.8 |
| Average relative humidity (%) | 69.0 | 65.3 | 57.8 | 46.4 | 43.2 | 48.3 | 54.4 | 56.1 | 52.7 | 55.0 | 65.9 | 69.3 | 56.9 |
| Mean monthly sunshine hours | 179.7 | 203.9 | 244.7 | 262.8 | 296.9 | 298.1 | 280.3 | 282.9 | 248.9 | 218.7 | 163.9 | 148.2 | 2,829.1 |
Source 1: NOAA
Source 2: Starlings Roost Weather

== Education ==
Uliastai is host to the Zavkhan branch of the National University of Mongolia. Originally established in 1974, it was granted the status of a full member of the NUM in 2010.

== Administrative divisions ==
The district is divided into six bags, which are:

- Bogdiin Gol
- Chigestei
- Jargalant
- Jinst
- Tovtsog
- Ulziit

== Tourist attractions ==
Museums

- Museum of Famous People – dedicated to former residents of Zavkhan aimag, the museum has artifacts from the lives of Mongolian prime ministers, presidents, generals and Buddhist saints (Хутагт).
- History Museum – Zavkhan's natural and cultural history museum.

Monasteries

- Togs Boyant Javklhant – located on a hilltop overlooking the Chigestai river, just north of the main street, this temple features a traditional Mongolian ger, several stupas and a large Bodhisattva statue.
- Ochirpurev Tsogt – A small Nyingma temple on Main street near the museums.

Javkhlant Tolgoi Next to Togs Boyant Javklhant temple, a hilltop pavilion surrounded by statues of elk, ibex, and argali sheep. It is not a long walk and provides a wide view of the city.

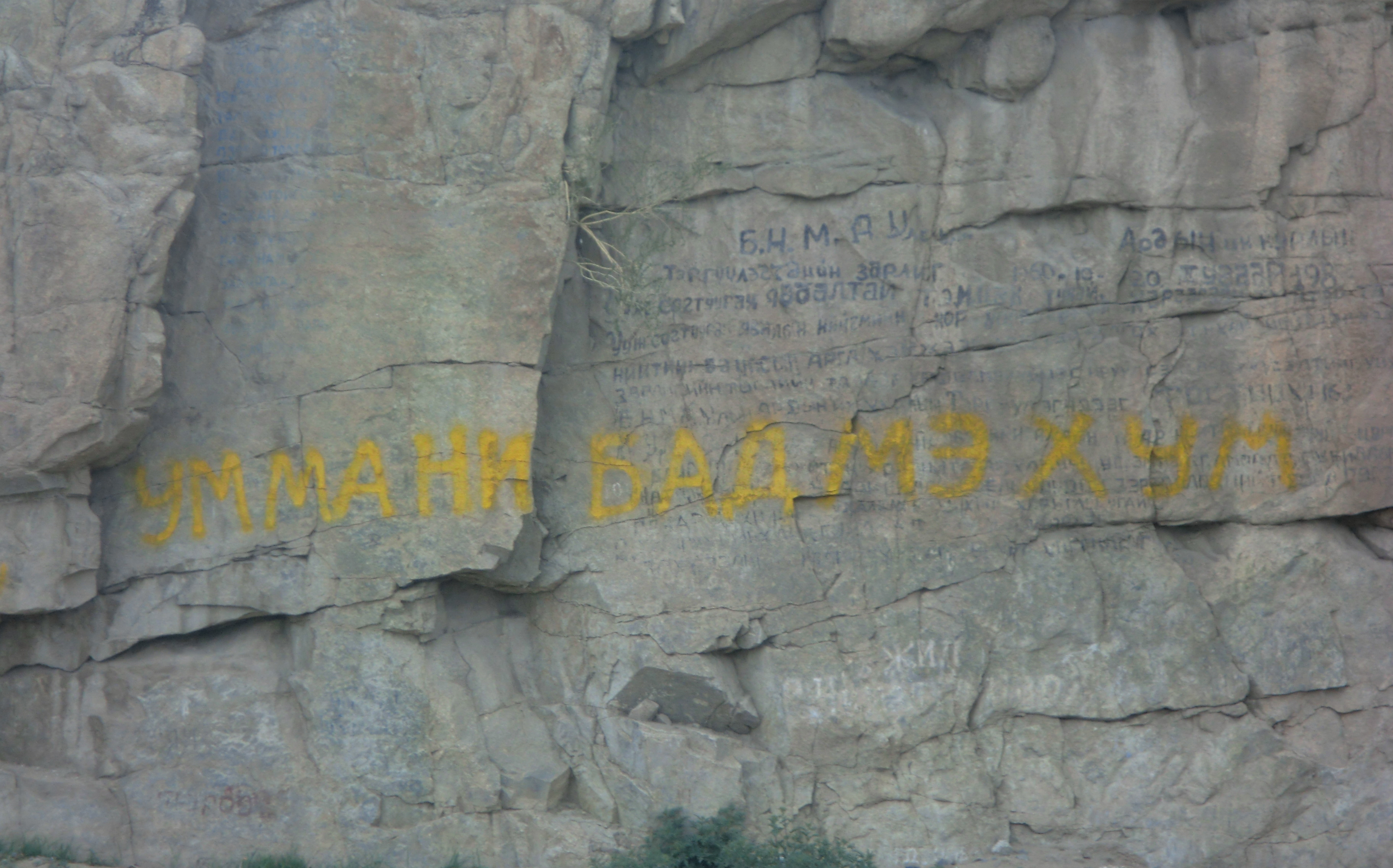
Religious graffiti at the base of Togs Boyant Javklhant Monastery. Transliterated from Mongolian Cyrillic, "Ommani Badme Xom," the Mongolian form of "Om mani padme hum".

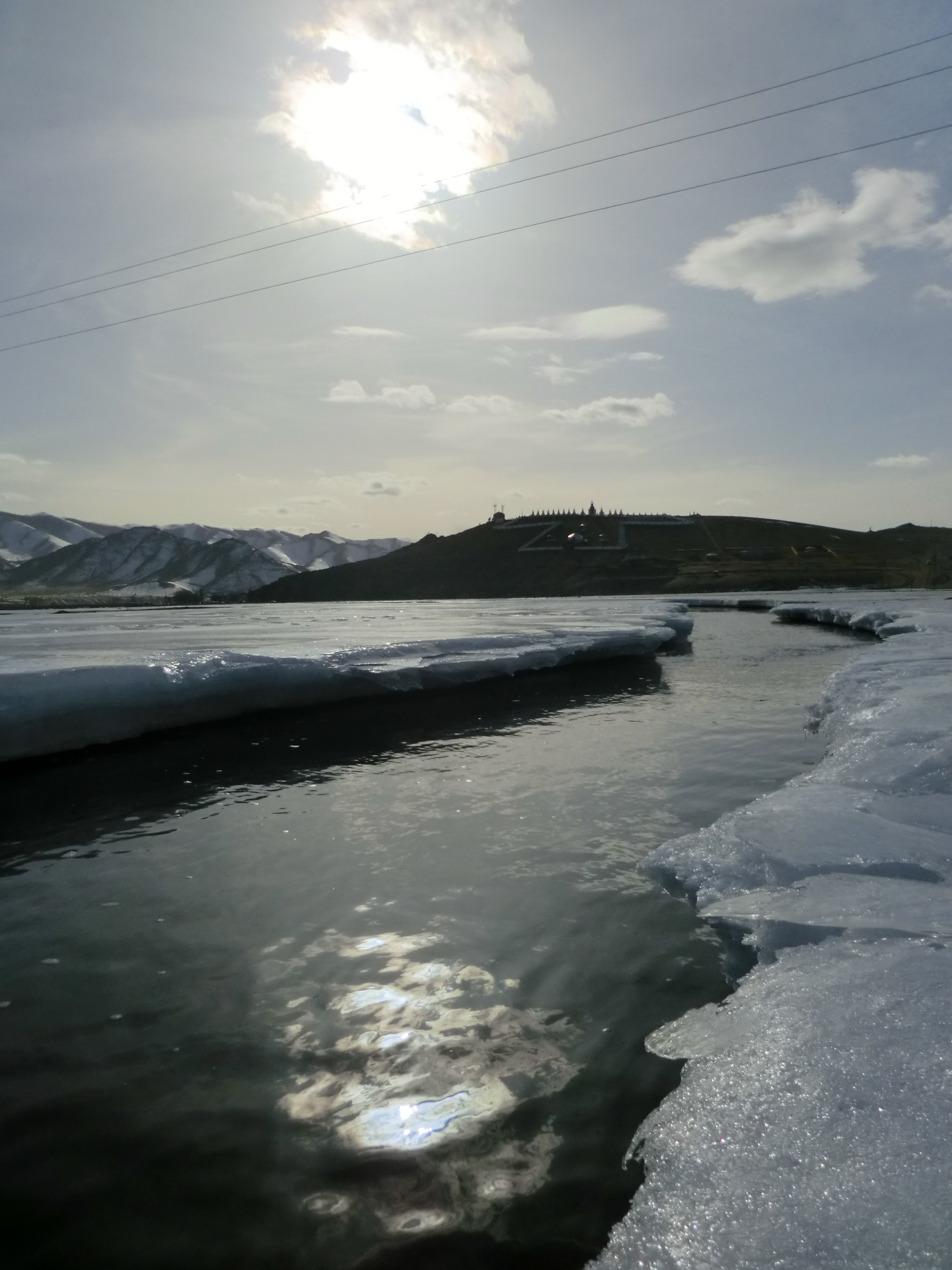
A view from the Chigestai River outside Uliastai, Mongolia (Javkhlant temple can be seen in the background)

== Transportation ==
The old Uliastai Airport has two unpaved runways and is close to the city, but no longer receives flights. In 2002, the Donoi Airport (or "New Uliastai Airport") was built 25 km west of the city near Aldarkhaan soum, and now serves Uliastai with regular flights to and from Ulaanbaatar.

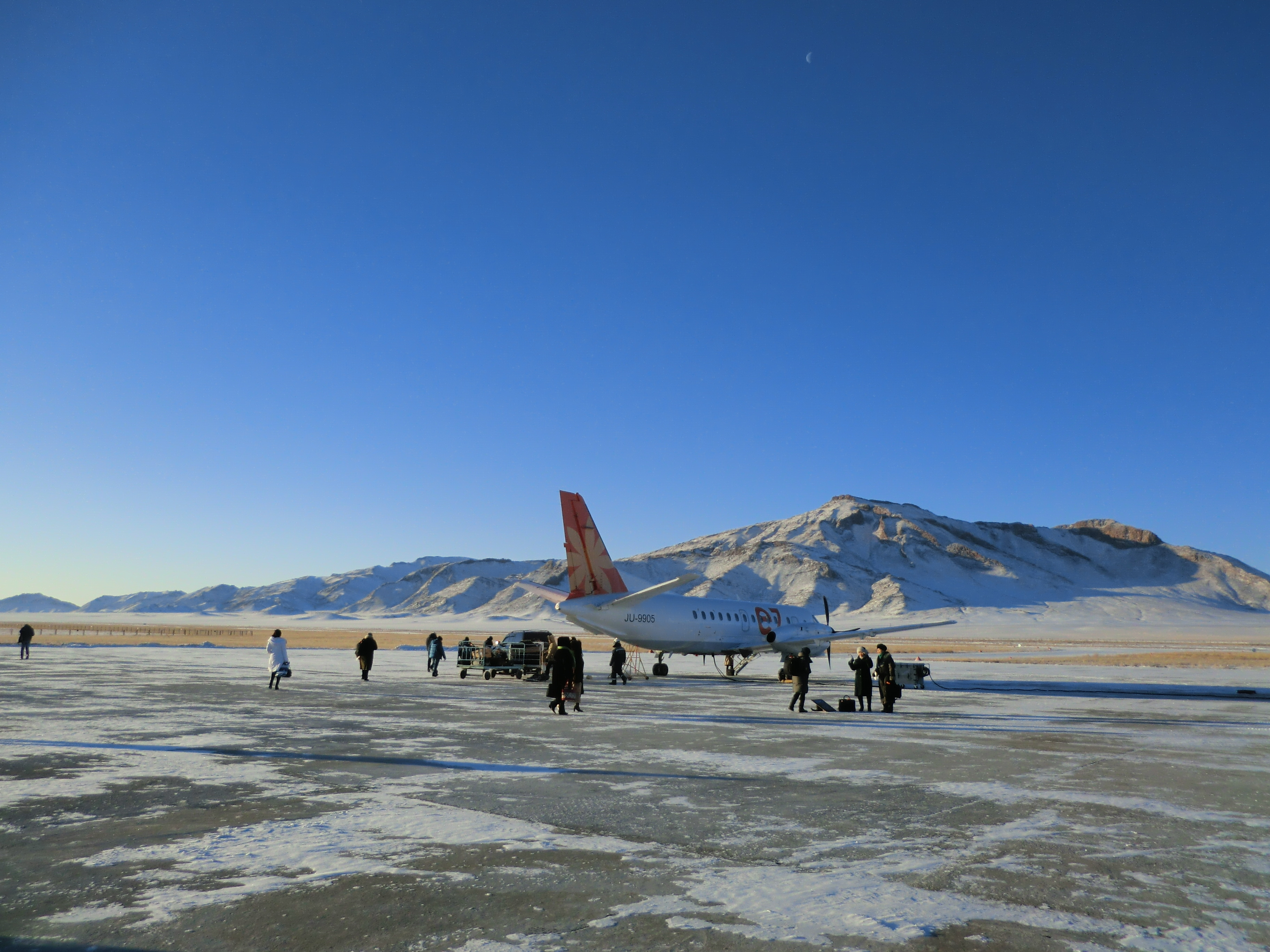
Passengers boarding a propeller plane to Ulaanbaatar at Donoi Airport (Uliastai) Zavkhan, Mongolia
