= Amban =

Ranks of officials in the Qing dynasty

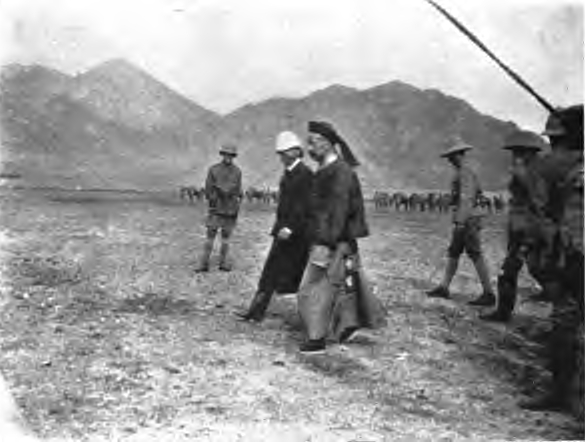
Youtai, the Amban of Lhasa, and Colonel Francis Younghusband

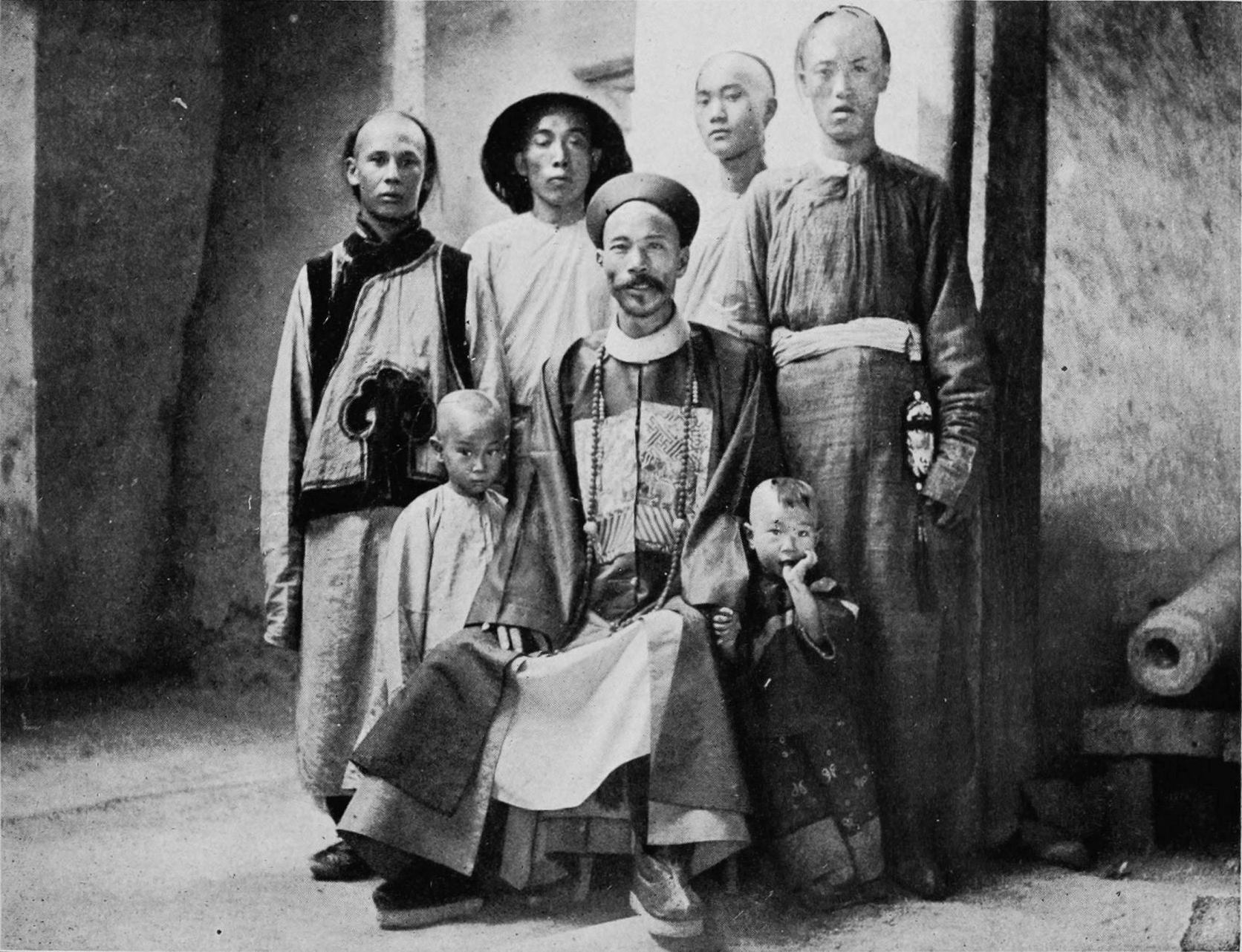
T'ang Ta-Jên, military Amban of Khotan, with his children and attendants

Amban (Manchu and Mongol: Амбан Amban, Tibetan: ཨམ་བན་am ben, Chinese: 昂邦, Uighur:ئامبان་am ben) is a Manchu language term meaning "high official" (Chinese: 大臣; pinyin: dàchén), corresponding to a number of different official titles in the imperial government of Qing China. For instance, members of the Grand Council were called Coohai nashūn-i amban in the Manchu language and Qing governor-generals were called Uheri kadalara amban (Manchu: ).

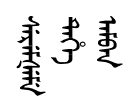
The most well-known ambans were the Qing imperial residents (Manchu: Seremšeme tehe amban; Chinese: 駐紮(劄)大臣 Zhùzhá Dàchén; Tibetan: Ngang pai) in Tibet, Qinghai, Mongolia and Xinjiang, which were territories of Qing China, but were not governed as regular provinces and retained many of their existing institutions.

The Qing imperial residents can be roughly compared to a European resident (also known as resident commissioners) in a protectorate (e.g. a British Indian princely state), the real rapport depending on historical circumstances rather than a general job description for every amban, while his authority was often very extensive, rather like a provincial governor.

== Tibet ==
The Qing Emperor appointed an amban in Tibet (Chinese: 駐藏大臣; pinyin: Zhùzàng Dàchén), who represented Qing authority over the Buddhist theocracy of Tibet, and commanded over 2,000 troops stationed in Lhasa. The chief amban was aided by an assistant amban (幫辦大臣; Bāngbàn Dàchén) and both of them reported to the Qing Lifan Yuan. Their duties included acting as intermediary between China and the Hindu kingdom of Nepal (Gorkha Kingdom or गोर्षा सर्कार pronounced: Gorkha Sarkar); a secretary (夷情章京; Yíqíng zhāngjīng) dealt with native affairs. Three Chinese commissioners (糧台; liángtái), of the class of sub-prefects, were stationed at Lhasa, Tashilumbo and Ngari.

The Qing imperial resident in Tibet was introduced in 1727 and most ambasa were appointed from the Manchu Eight Banners, a few were Han Chinese or Mongol. The Emperors used ambasa to supervise Tibetan politics, and the Qianlong, Jiaqing and Daoguang Emperors each decreed that the Dalai Lama and Panchen Lama were bound to follow the leadership or guidance of the ambasa in carrying out the administration of Tibet.

Zhao Erfeng, a Han Chinese Bannerman, was appointed as the last Amban of Tibet by the Qing government. He was killed during the Xinhai Revolution by Chinese Republican Revolutionary forces intent on overthrowing the Qing dynasty. After the fall of the Qing dynasty in 1912, the Manchu Amban Lien Yu and his Chinese soldiers were expelled from Lhasa.

== Xinjiang ==
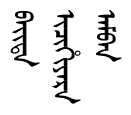
Altishahr, meaning six cities, consisted of the Uyghur cities of Yarkand, Kashgar, Khotan, Kuche, Aksu, and Yangi Hisar (or Ush-Turfan). The Qing dynasty's wars with the Zunghar Khanate pushed them into the area and by 1759 they had obtained control of this region. After the rebellion of Yakub Beg, Altishahr was incorporated into the administration of Xinjiang, which became a formal province in the Qing empire in 1884. Between 1761 and 1865, the Qing Empire appointed an imperial resident (Manchu: hebei amban; Chinese: zǒnglǐ huíjiāng shìwù cānzàn dàchén 總理回疆事務參贊大臣) to Altishahr, which today forms part of southern Xinjiang. The imperial resident, who resided in Kashgar, Ush Turfan or Yarkand and exercised Qing authority over the region. The imperial resident was controlled with local imperial agents (Manchu: Baita icihiyara amban; Chinese: Bànshì dàchén 辦事大臣), who were sent to most important cities in the region, where they ruled in conjunction with the local officials (Uighurھاكىمبەگ hakim beg, Chinese: 阿奇木伯克), who were given ranks in the Qing civil service and were ultimately accountable to the imperial agent.

== Urga ==
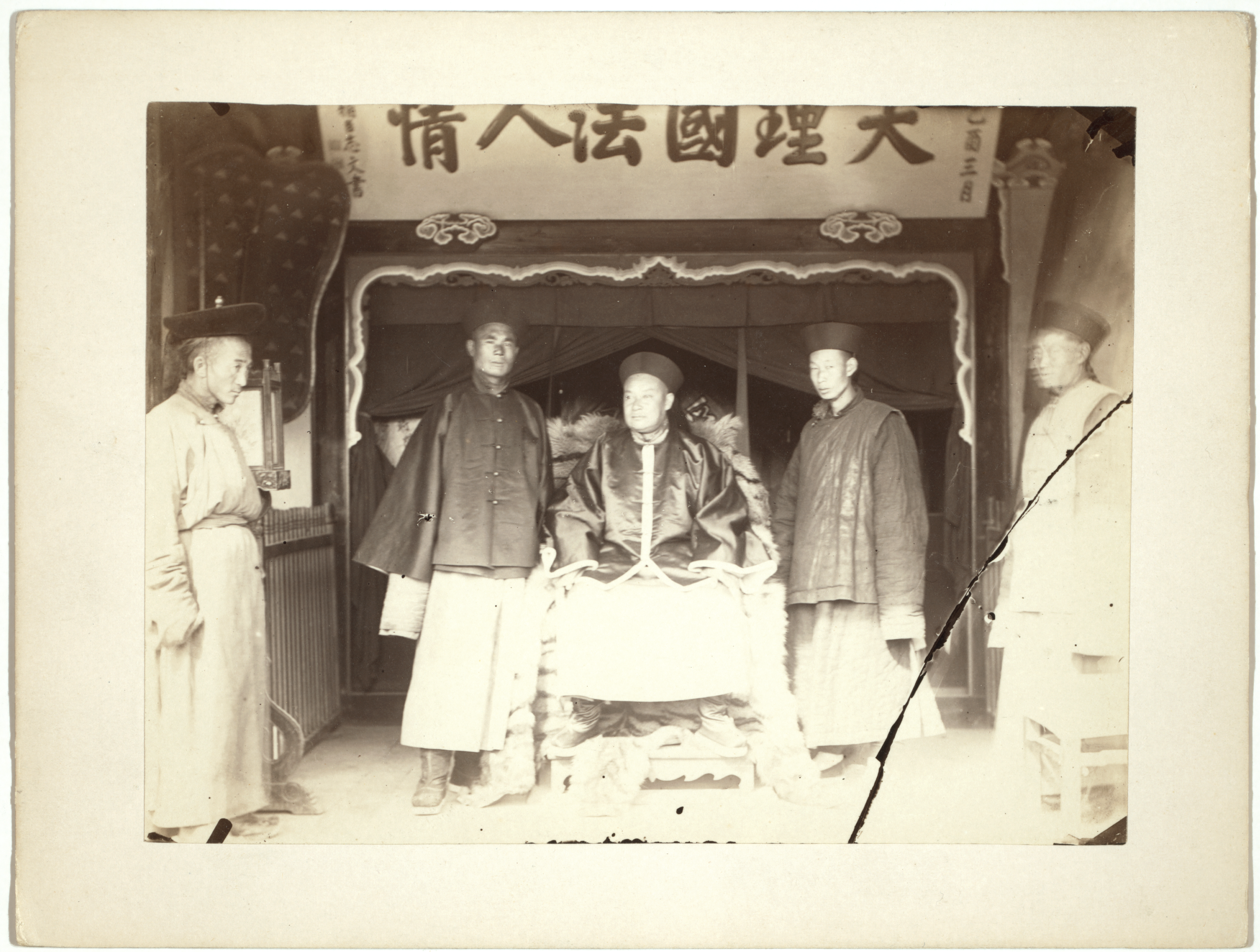
Ambans of Zergoocha Yamen in Maimachin

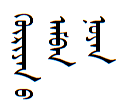
In the holy city of Urga, an amban (Mongol: Хүрээний амбан ноён, Chinese: 庫倫辦事大臣 Kùlún bànshì dàchén) was stationed in order to assert Qing control over the Mongol dependencies. He controlled all temporal matters, and was specially charged with the control of the frontier town of Kiakhta and the trade conducted there with the Russians. Urga was also the residence of the Jebtsundamba Khutuktu, who was the spiritual head of the Mongol Khalkha tribes. The Khutuktu ranked third in degree of veneration among the dignitaries in the Tibetan Buddhism, after the Dalai Lama and Panchen Lama. He resided in a sacred quarter on the western side of the town and acted as a spiritual counterpart of the Qing amban.

After the fall of the Qing dynasty in 1912, the Manchu amban was expelled by Mongol forces, fleeing to China proper via Russia.

== Manchuria ==
In the early Qing, the word amban was also used in the title of the military governors (昂邦章京, angbang-zhangjing, which is a transcription of the Manchu amban-jianggin; R.L. Edmonds translates the title in English as "military deputy-lieutenant governor") in the northeastern provinces of the Qing Empire, viz. Jilin and Heilongjiang. The first amban-jianggin appointed in the region was the Ninguta garrison commander Sarhuda, who became the amban-jianggin of Ninguta in June 1653.

== See also ==
- Qing dynasty in Inner Asia
- Lifan Yuan

== Bibliography ==
- Ho, Dahpon David. "The Men Who Would Not Be Amban and the One Who Would: Four Frontline Officials and Qing Tibet Policy, 1905-1911." Modern China 34, no. 2 (2008): 210–46.
- Kolmaš, Josef. The Ambans and Assistant Ambans of Tibet, Archiv Orientální. Supplementa 7. Prague: The Oriental Institute, 1994.
- Mayers, William Frederick. The Chinese Government: A Manual of Chinese Titles, Categorically Arranged and Explained, with an Appendix. 3rd edition revised by G.M.H. Playfair ed. Shanghai: Kelly & Walsh, 1897; reprint, Taipei: Ch'eng-Wen Pub. Co., 1966.
- Newby, Laura J. The Empire and the Khanate: A Political History of Qing Relations with Khoqand C. 1760-1860. Leiden; Boston: Brill, 2005.
- Norman, Jerry. A Concise Manchu-English Lexicon. Seattle: University of Washington Press, 1978.
- Shakya, Tsering. The Dragon In The Land Of Snows (1999) Columbia University Press. ISBN 0-231-11814-7
