= Lhümbe Case =

Political Repression

The Lhümbe Case (Mongolian: Лхүмбийн хэрэг, romanized: Lkhümbiin khereg), also known as Lkhümbe Case or Lkhümbe Affair, was the first fabricated espionage case targeting the Buryat population in Mongolia and one of the earliest purges targeting Mongolian intellectuals and political leaders, resulting in the execution or long-term imprisonment of 317 or more than 400 individuals for involvement in a concocted Japanese spy ring in July 1933. The case was named after Jambyn Lkhümbe, General Secretary of the Central Committee of the Mongolian People's Revolutionary Party. 53-60 persons were executed and 251 Buryats were imprisoned or executed.

== Victims ==
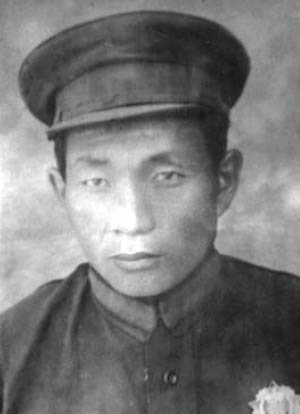
J. Lkhümbe, one of the key victims executed for wrongful convinction

The number of the case victims varies according to scholars. According to some Mongolian historians, in the Lhümbe Case, a total of 317 individuals were arrested, of whom 53 were executed by firing squad, 136 were sentenced to imprisonment ranging from 3 to 10 years, and 126 were deported to gulags in the Soviet Union. In addition, the number of people implicated in the case ultimately reached around 1,500. An examination of those involved shows that they can be broadly divided into three groups: first, a majority of Buryat people who had migrated to Mongolia seeking refuge; second, former high-ranking party and state officials associated with the leftist leadership period, including Zolbingiin Shijee, Ölziitiin Badrakh, Losolyn Laagan, Dendev, Gonjoon, and Battömör; and third, individuals arrested due to personal grievances within the Internal Security apparatus. The case also ensnared those registered with the Soviet NKVD and individuals who had been living witnesses to earlier Bolshevik activities in Mongolia, effectively making them victims of a subsequent purge operation.

International historians put the figure at 251 Buryats or more than 400 arrests. They argue that, as a result of this purge, 60 persons were executed, 257 were imprisoned, and 126 were deported to the Siberian labor camp in Kolyma. Of those arrested, 141 ordinary officials, 22 were security agents, and 149 were herders.

== Background ==
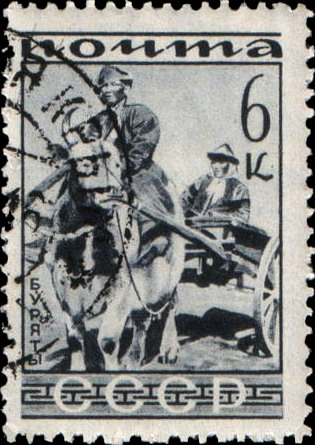
Buryats depicted on a 1933 "Peoples of the Soviet Union" stamp

The Buryats, ethnically closely linked to the Khalkha, were dissastified with the Soviet policies and persecution of the Buryat-Mongol culture. Consequently, a large number of them immigrated to Outer Mongolia. Over 15,800 Buryats settled in northern Mongolia. Since the revolution in 1921, many educated Buryats served in Mongolian politics, administration and education. Soviet leader Joseph Stalin saw them as a threat to his policy implemented in Mongolia. He decided to use the Russian communist agents in the country to take revenge.

Certain Mongolian politicians and statesmen, identified as the Leftists by the Soviets, also clashed with Russian advisors over the Soviet religious and economic policies in Mongolia. The emergence of leftists in 1928 introduced waves of Soviet-inspired anti-religious campaigns, forced collectivization efforts, and confiscation of feudal estates between 1928 and 1932. The new policies coincided with Stalin's own collectivization and anti-religious campaigns in the USSR. However, the Soviet-backed policies led to an economic breakdown and a widespread armed uprisings by the Buddhist clergy between 1930 and 1932. The rebellion was crushed in October 1932. During the revolt, in May 1932, the Comintern and the ruling Soviet party directed the Mongolian People's Revolutionary Party (MPRP) to end its "extremism." In the years after the uprising, the MPRP rejected what it described "leftist deviation" and began to carry out the removal of top leftist leaders along with the reversal of collectivization.

With the advance of the Japanese empire in Manchuria and eastern Inner Mongolia in 1931-1933, the Mongolian People's Republic almost had a third neighbour in addition to Soviet Russia and the Republic of China. Some Mongols in China welcomed the Japanese as liberators. The Japanese aggression and Mongol nationalists worried the Soviet authorities. Moreover, in 1929, two Mongolian soldiers reportedly fled from Mongolia to Manchuria, which was then under Japanese control. Rumors circulated that these alleged defectors remained active in eastern Mongolia, moving between Mongolia and northeastern China during the early 1930s. Some Mongolian historians have suggested that the incident involving the soldiers' defection may have been a fabricated or orchestrated operation attributed to Soviet involvement.

During the mid-1930s, the number of Soviet advisers in Mongolia grew significantly, rising from 81 in 1935 to 205 in 1936. At the same time, the composition of advisory roles shifted: whereas earlier Soviet involvement had been primarily concentrated on economic matters, by the mid-1930s military advisers had become increasingly prominent, numbering 110 in 1936 and reaching 681 by 1939. Alongside these developments, a more coercive group of advisers was reportedly engaged in training Mongolia’s security organs in counterespionage techniques, including the use of torture to construct and expand fabricated spy cases. Earlier precedents for such practices can be seen in several cases from the early 1920s, including the Bodoo Case of 1922, which was widely regarded as having been orchestrated with Soviet involvement. However, after 1925 the activities of the security services were temporarily curtailed, before a renewed and far larger wave of repression emerged with the Lhümbe Case in 1933.

== Purge ==
The affair began in early July 1933 when Danzin, an internal security agent in Norovlin, Khentii, allegedly forged a letter accusing the local cooperative chairman, Tsebegjab, of serving as a leading figure in a Japanese conspiracy to seize Mongolia. The accusation reinforced existing Soviet suspicions toward Buryats who had migrated from Russia and settled in northeastern Mongolia. Danzin and Tsebegjab were reportedly already in a strained relationship prior to the incident, influenced by tensions arising from their personal affairs. Danzin scapegoated his old enemy, innocent Tsebegjab. Meanwhile, the Soviet advisors were unhappy with the Mongolian politician Jambyn Lkhümbe's stance towards reforms in Mongolia. By coincidence, Lkhümbe was travelling in Khentii on an official trip around that time, which gave the Soviets an excuse to wrongfully accuse him as the ringleader of a concocted Japanese spy network. Some historians have suggested that Soviet authorities and their Mongolian collaborators may have deliberately assigned Lkhümbe to Khentii during that period.

Within weeks, the investigation expanded rapidly, leading to numerous arrests of alleged “counterrevolutionaries” and “Japanese spies” in Khentii Province. Testimony extracted from Tsebegjab under coercion implicated additional officials, resulting in the June 22 arrest of more than 30 figures in Ulaanbaatar, including former Prime Minister Ts. Jigjidjav and senior party leader J. Lhümbe (1902–1934), who had become politically estranged from Prime Minister P. Genden. The investigation was directed in part by Namsarai, head of state security, and was followed by further arrests in Dornod Province.

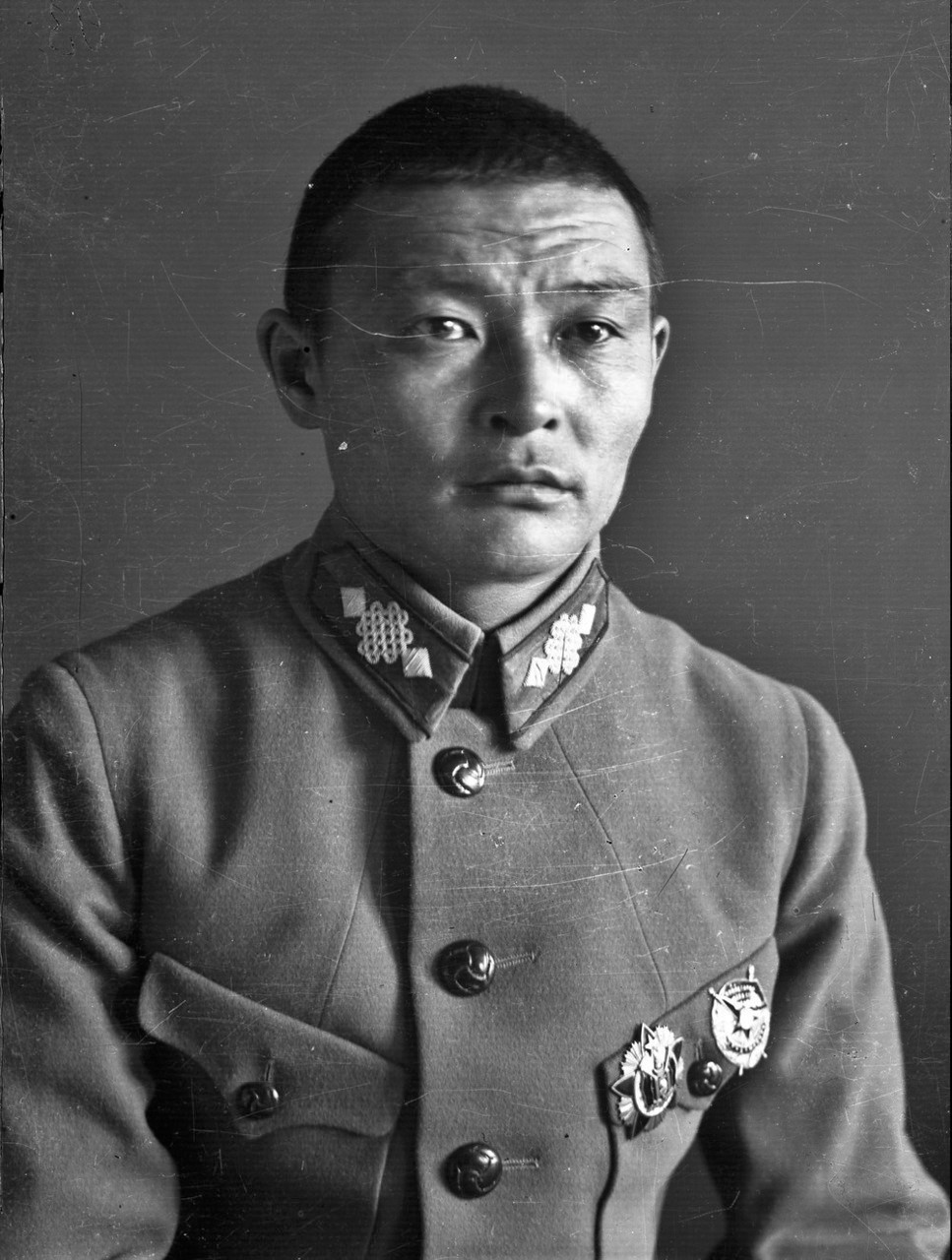
The Mongolian statesman and future leader Kh. Choibalsan circa 1925

Soviet advisers—both Russian and Buryat—working alongside Mongolian security personnel reportedly employed systematic torture and coerced testimony to widen the scope of the alleged conspiracy. Most defendants were convicted in show trials held in December 1933. In the end, 60 people were executed, 257 received prison sentences, and 126 were deported to the Kolyma labor camps in Siberia. Buryats accounted for 251 of those imprisoned or executed. Among those arrested were 141 civilian officials, 22 security officers, and 149 herders. Lhümbe consistently denied the charges against him, even after being tortured during interrogation in Moscow, but was returned to Mongolia and executed on June 30, 1934. Several remaining leftists, including Lhümbe and Mongolia's former prime minister, Ts. Jigjidjaw, were executed as Japanese spies.

In 1933, Mongolia's future head of state Khorloogiin Choibalsan’s name came up in the Lhümbe Case, just as it had in the Bodoo case, yet the young Mongolian politician avoided implication this time through high-level Soviet intervention.

In a petition submitted to the Central Committee of the Mongolian People's Revolutionary Party on 25 February 1935, S. Givaapil, then Deputy Director of the State Internal Security Department, alleged that unlawful investigative methods had been employed during the handling of the case. He stated that detainees were subjected to physical abuse, intimidation, sleep deprivation, and prolonged interrogation. According to Givaapil, some suspects were reportedly interrogated continuously for up to 72 hours in Khentii and for as long as seven days and nights (168 hours) in Ulaanbaatar without rest. He further claimed that, as a result of fear and exhaustion, detainees often provided false testimony and confessed to allegations by simply agreeing with investigators' questions.

Investigators obtained testimony from S. Erentsen and M. Tseveen identifying Lkhümbe as the leader of the alleged organization. However, in a statement submitted in 1961, Erentsen asserted that he had never previously seen Lkhümbe and claimed that the face-to-face identification had been fabricated. His later testimony called into question the reliability of the earlier identification.

== Aftermath ==
After the case, Choibalsan was exiled to Moscow. Escaping involvement by assisting in the interrogation of other suspects, in 1934 Stalin appointed him Mongolia’s deputy prime minister.

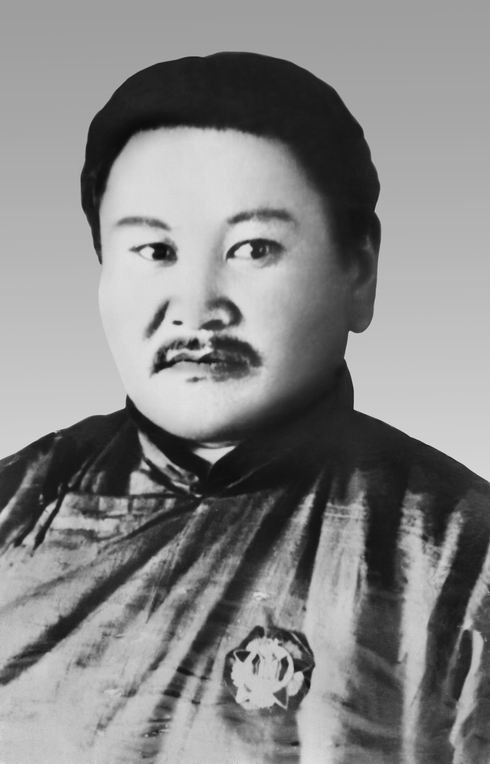
Genden

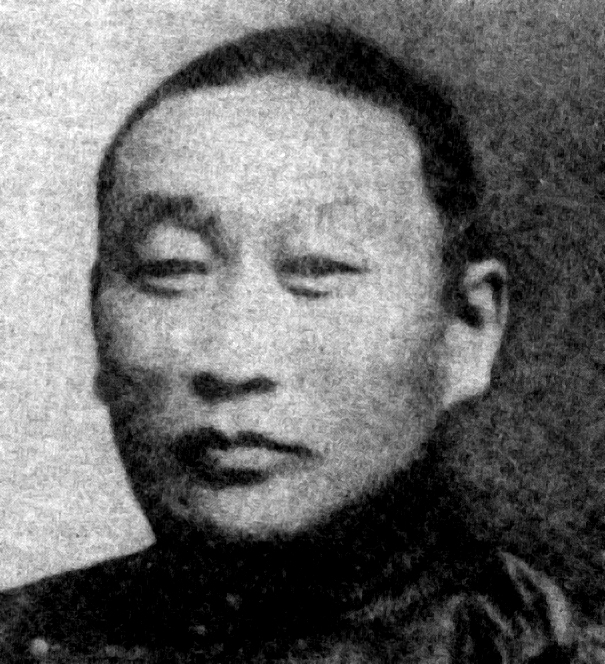
Amar

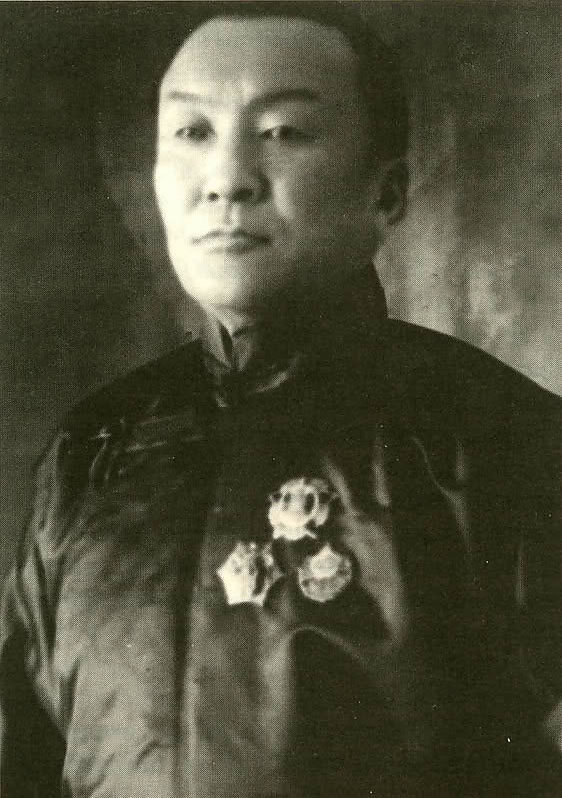
Dogsom

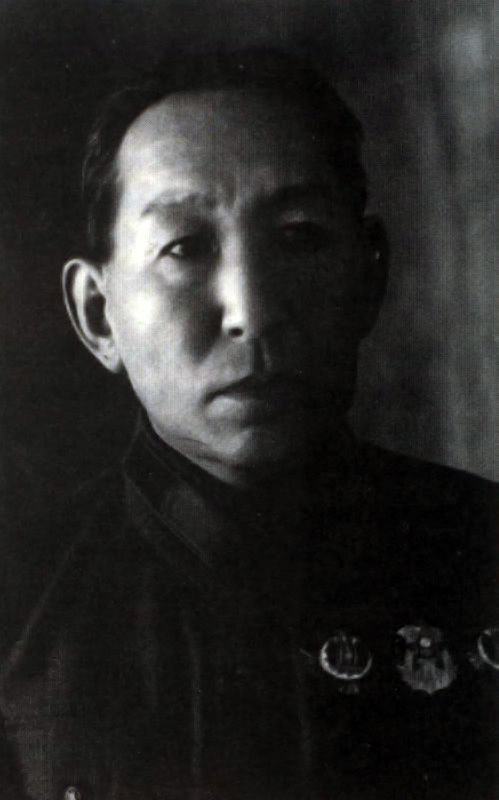
Losol

Notable victims of Choibalsan's purges include (from left); prime ministers P. Genden and A. Amar, and two of the founding members of the MPRP D. Dogsom and D. Losol

In 1936, prominent Mongolian leaders, Anandyn Amar and Dansranbilegiin Dogsom, sought to secure the release of individuals who remained imprisoned as a result of the fabricated case. The following year, Amur urged the state prosecutor to critically examine the conspiracy allegations advanced by Choibalsan, arguing that they lacked credibility. His efforts did not succeed. On March 7, 1939, during a Presidium meeting, Lubsangsharab ordered Amur’s arrest. He was deported to the Soviet Union in July, where he was subjected to torture during interrogation and ultimately confessed to a series of fabricated offenses. Amar was executed on February 10, 1941. The Soviets likewise executed Dogsom in Moscow in July 1941.

The end of the Lhümbe Case did not stop political purges of the Mongols, including Buryats, in Mongolia and Russia. Approximately 5,300 Buryats in Mongolia were subjected to persecution during the years 1937–1938. Furthermore, many Buryats living within the Soviet Union faced repression after being accused of acting as Japanese spies or supporting Pan-Mongolism, a movement that Soviet authorities claimed sought to detach Buryatia from the USSR and establish a unified Mongolian state under Japanese influence. Among those targeted were numerous Buddhist monks as well as the entire leadership of the Buryat cavalry brigades under the Soviet command.

The Government of Mongolia later officially recognized the Lhümbe Case as a wrongful conviction. Accordingly, J. Lhümbe was posthumously rehabilitated and his reputation restored by Resolution No. 79 of February 13, 1962, issued by the Commission for Rehabilitation under the Presidium of the Great Khural of the Mongolian People’s Republic.

== See Also ==
- Stalinist repressions in Mongolia
- Buryats
- Port Arthur Case
- Battles of Khalkhin Gol
- Mengjiang
- Actions in Inner Mongolia (1933–1936)
