= Ajvaagiin Danzan =

Mongolian revolutionary (1875–1932)

- Ажваагийн Данзан
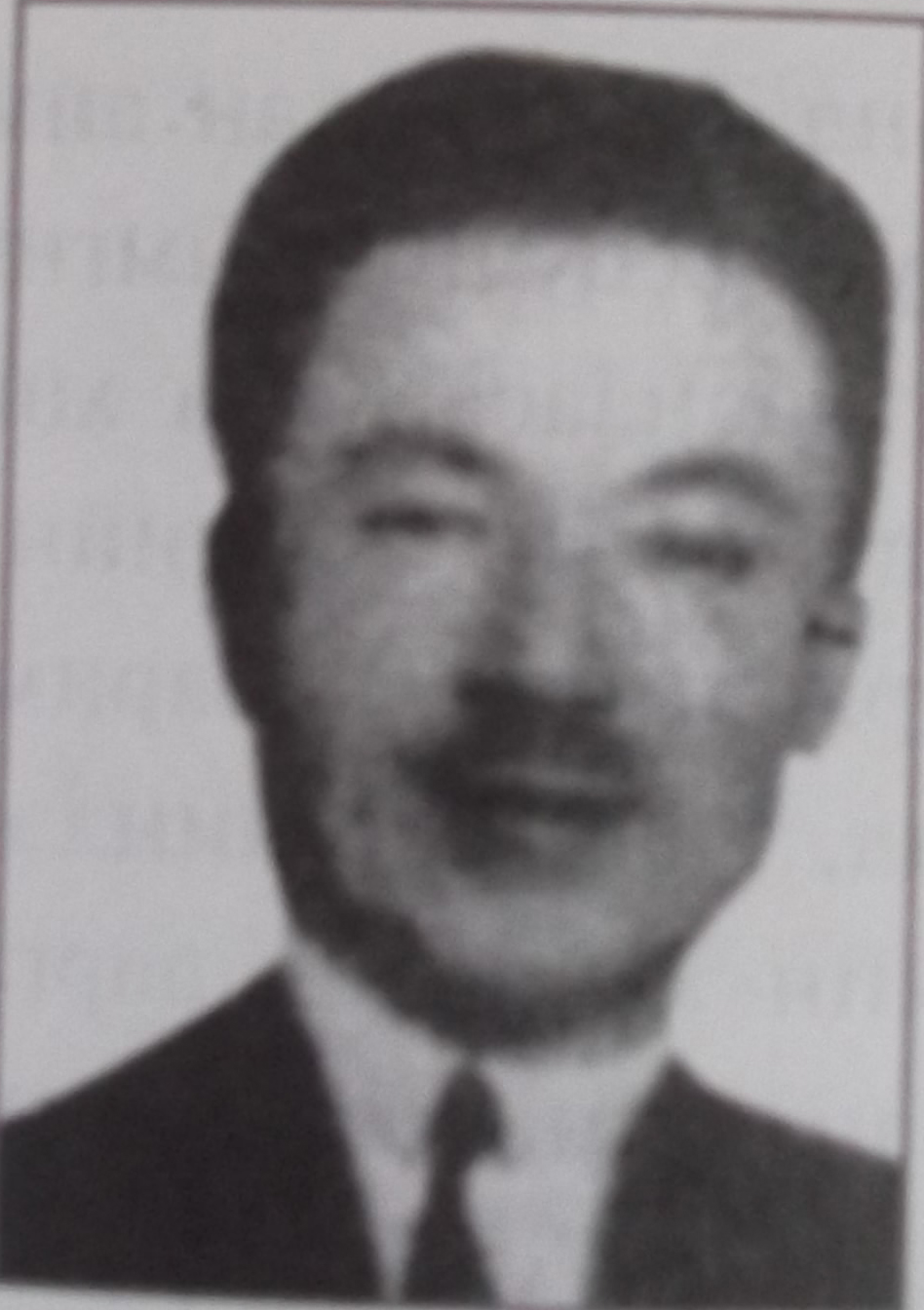

Chairman of the Mongolian People's Party
- In office 2 January 1923 – 31 August 1924
- Preceded by: Tseren-Ochiryn Dambadorj
- Succeeded by: Tseren-Ochiryn Dambadorj

Personal details
- Born: 1875 Tüsheet Khan, Outer Mongolia, Qing China (present-day Mogod, Bulgan)
- Died: 1 June 1932 (aged 56–57) Ulaanbaatar, Mongolia
- Party: Mongolian People's Revolutionary Party (1921–1932)
- Nickname: Japan Danzan

Ajvaagiin Danzan (Mongolian: Ажваагийн Данзан; 1875–1932), also known as Japan Danzan (Япон Данзан) or Little Danzan, was a Mongolian revolutionary, politician and spy who served as the chairman of Mongolian People's Party (MPP) from 2 January 1923 to 31 August 1924.

== Early life and endeavors ==
Danzan was born as the only child of a herder family in Tüsheet Khan Province (present-day Mogod, Bulgan Province) in late autumn of 1875. He was sent to a major monastery from a young age and eventually pursued his studies in Buddhist teachings and set off for Tibet owing to the fortune of his father, Ajvai.

At the age of 21, in 1896, Danzan went to Lhasa and several other monasteries in Qinghai (traditionally known as Amdo in Tibetan), where he met with local Mongols and supported efforts to preserve Buddhism. He also befriended important religious figures in Tibet, including the Dalai Lama and Panchen Lama, which is believed to have had an impact on his world views.

== Early career ==
In 1905, Danzan returned to Mongolia to take part in the struggle for Mongolian independence, a decision influenced by his understanding of Russian, Chinese, and Japanese policies regarding the region.

Following the independence of the Bogd Khanate in 1911, Danzan served in the intelligence agency of the Bogd Khan's regime. During his service, he uncovered Japanese spy operations in the capital, Niislel Khuree, and artificially bonded with two Japanese spies. In 1916, Danzan was sent on a special espionage mission to Japan by foreign minister Balingiin Tserendorj.

While in Japan, he resided in Yokohama and became known to prominent Japanese figures in industry, commerce, and the military as the owner of a fur trade business. Alongside Japanese, he was well-versed in Chinese, Tibetan, and English. Danzan returned to Mongolia in 1918 and worked at a printing office in Niislel Khuree. His activities in Japan earned him the moniker he carried later in life to distinguish him from his contemporary namesake, MPP leader Soliin Danzan.

== Revolutionary activities ==
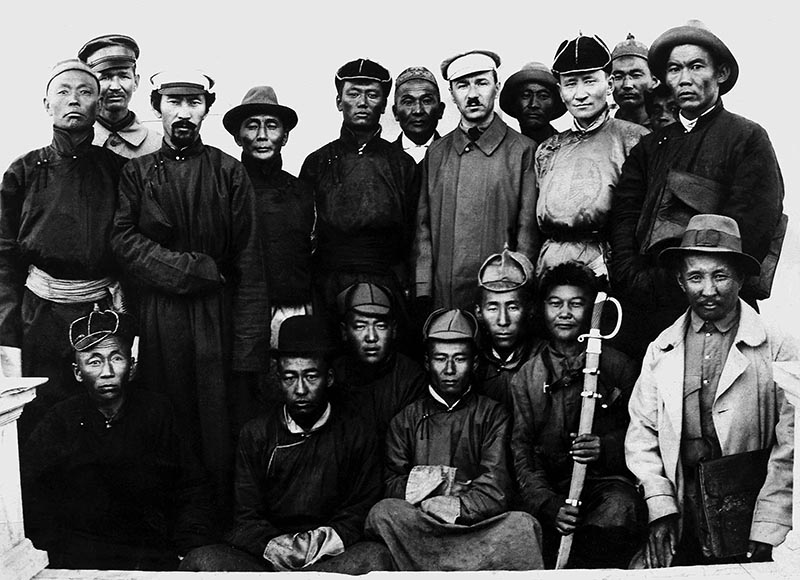
Back row from left: ?, ?, Elbegdorj Rinchino, Soliin Danzan, Damdin Sükhbaatar, Ajvaagiin Danzan, Boris Shumyatsky, ?, Dogsomyn Bodoo

However, in October 1919, Outer Mongolia was re-occupied by Chinese forces. Between 1920 and early 1921, Danzan helped conceal the activities of the revolutionary organization, Mongolian People's Party (MPP), from occupying troops. In the wake of the People's Revolution, commander Damdin Sükhbaatar personally befriended Danzan after the liberating of Kyakhta. With Sükhbaatar's support, Danzan joined the Mongolian People's Party in July 1921.

Danzan was elected vice-chairman of the Central Committee from 1922 to 1923, and then chairman from 2 January 1923 to 1924. Danzan was party chairman during the Third Party Congress in 1924 that saw the purge and execution of former party chairman S.Danzan. He was succeeded by Tseren-Ochiryn Dambadorj in August 1924 and served as vice-chairman from 1924 to 1925.

Coinciding with his chairmanship, Danzan went on a secret party mission to help found a youth revolutionary organization by Barga Mongols in Hulunbuir. With the help of succeeding MPP chair Dambadorj, the organization later founded Inner Mongolian People's Revolutionary Party in October 1925. The mission to support Inner Mongolian separatism was carried out amidst the opposition to Mongolian nationalism by the Soviet Union, which signed a treaty that recognized Chinese claims over Mongolia in 1924.

Georgy Chicherin (wearing deel) with the Mongolian delegation and Danzan (left of Chicherin) in Moscow, May 1925

Danzan later became a diplomatic envoy with postings in Soviet Russia from 1925 to 1926. The same year he was dismissed, the Soviet Union recognized the Tuvan People's Republic regardless of his opposition. Subsequently, he was appointed as trade envoy to China (Beijing, Shanghai, Tianjin, Nanjing, and Harbin) from 1926 to 1928.

In late 1928, after the conclusion of the Seventh Party Congress, party politics took a sharp leftward turn as political control was assumed by leftists, such as Ölziitiin Badrakh, Peljidiin Genden, and Tsengeltiin Jigjidjav. Due to his business operations in Yokohama, he was recalled from China by the party on the premise of him being a "petty bourgeoisie." Consequently, he was tasked at the Institute of Manuscripts from 1929 to 1931 alongside Prime Minister Anandyn Amar.

== Arrest and death ==
In 1932, Danzan was caught up in a widescale purge of suspected rightwingers (mostly politicians who voiced concerns with growing Soviet influence in Mongolia) that included Jamsrangiin Tseveen, Tseren-Ochiryn Dambadorj, and Navaandorjiin Jadambaa. On 24 February 1932, Danzan was arrested and charged with counterrevolution for allegedly collaborating with Japanese intelligence as his nickname suggested. He was put into a mental institution for denying his charges. He died on 1 June 1932 before going to trial.

Party political offices
Preceded by Tseren-Ochiryn Dambadorj	Chairman of the Mongolian People's Party; 2 January 1923 – 31 August 1924	Succeeded by Tseren-Ochiryn Dambadorj
