= Dorjjavyn Luvsansharav =

Mongolian politician (1900–1941)

- Доржжавын Лувсаншарав
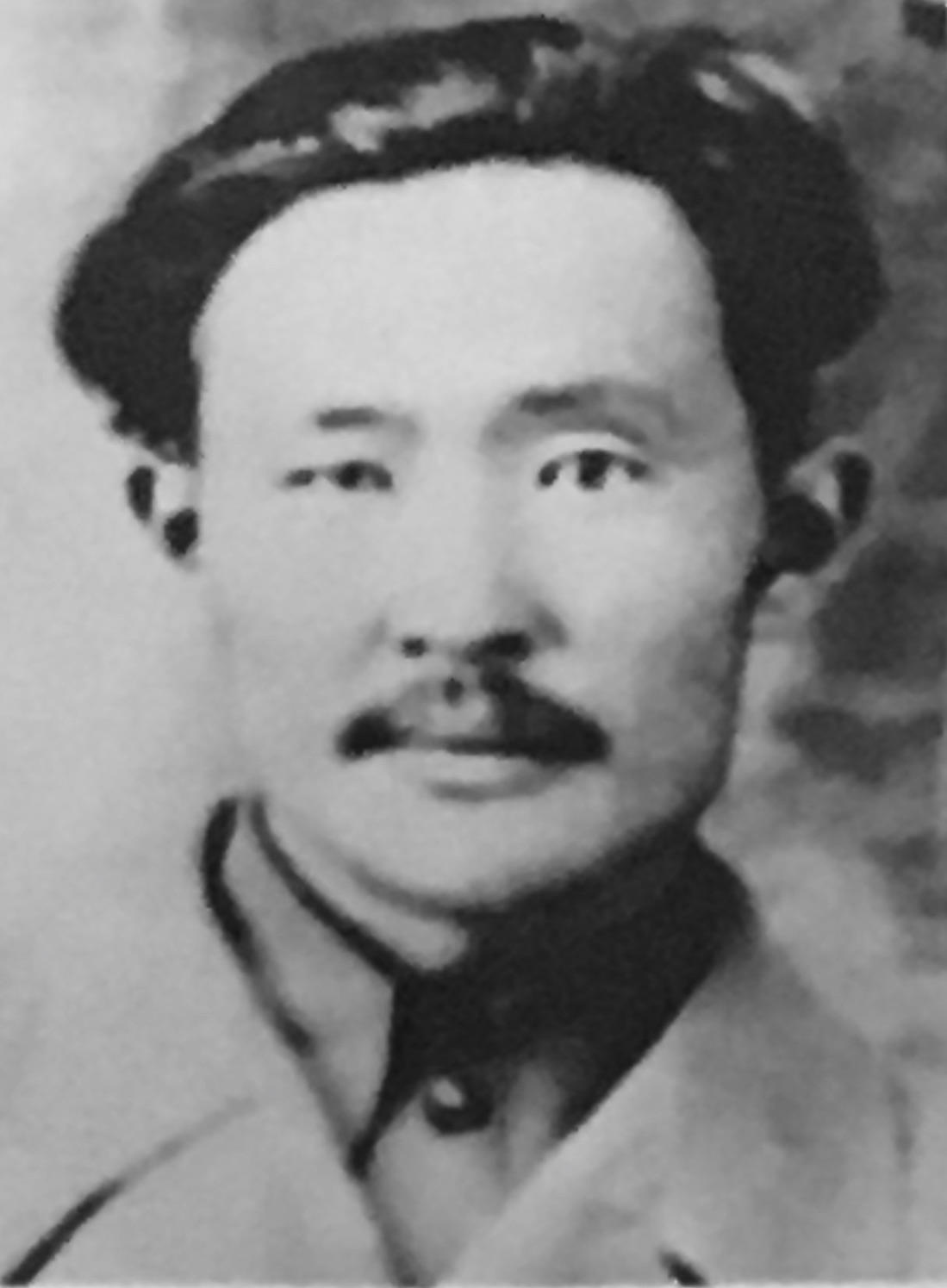

Secretary of the Central Committee of the Mongolian People's Revolutionary Party
- In office 30 June 1932 – 9 July 1939 Serving with Bat-Ochiryn Eldev-Ochir; Jambyn Lkhümbe (Note: Lkhümbe was replaced by Khas-Ochiryn Luvsandorj in 1934 following his death. Luvsandorj was replaced by Banzarjavyn Baasanjav in October 1936.)
- Preceded by: Ölziitiin Badrakh; Peljidiin Genden; Zolbingiin Shijee
- Succeeded by: Dashiin Damba

Personal details
- Born: 1900 Zasagt Khan, Outer Mongolia, Qing China (present-day Ikh-Uul, Khövsgöl)
- Died: 30 July 1941 (aged 40–41) Moscow, Russian SFSR, Soviet Union
- Cause of death: Execution by firing squad
- Resting place: Kommunarka shooting ground, Moscow
- Party: Mongolian People's Revolutionary Party (1925–1939)

Dorjjavyn Luvsansharav (Mongolian: Доржжавын Лувсаншарав; 1900 – 30 July 1941) was a Mongolian politician who served as the Secretary of the Mongolian People's Revolutionary Party (MPRP) from 1932 to 1939. A central figure during the violent Stalinist repressions in Mongolia, Luvsansharav presided over arrests, torture, and executions of over 25,000 "enemies of the revolution" between 1937 and 1939 and was instrumental in the violent purges of prime minister Peljidiin Genden and Anandyn Amar. He ultimately fell victim to the purges himself with his arrest in 1939 on charges of counterrevolution and execution in Moscow in 1941.

== Early life and career ==
Luvsansharav was born in 1900 in Zasagt Khan Province (present day Ikh-Uul in Khövsgöl Province). At the age of 10, he was sent to Möröngiin Khuree monastery to become a lama in 1910, but left to raise livestocks in 1921. He joined the MPRP in 1925, first heading up a local MPRP cell and then attending the Party school in Ulaanbaatar in 1927 where he made a name for himself combating rightists in the student body. After attending the Communist University of the Toilers of the East in Moscow from 1928 to 1929, he returned to take up leadership of the MPRP in Khan-Taishir-Uul province (present day Zavkhan Province).

One of several "new leftists" promoted during the Eight Party Congress in 1930, Luvsansharav first headed a department at the Presidium of the MPRP Central Committee and then became a member of the presidium and deputy secretary of the Central Committee before being elected one of three secretaries of Central Committee in June 1932 (a position he would hold until 1939).

== Stalinist repressions in Mongolia ==
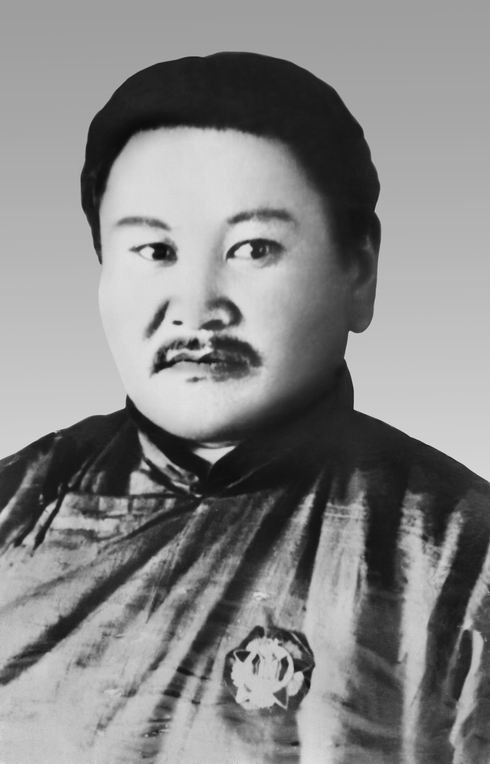
Prime minister Peljidiin Genden

=== Purge of Genden (1936) ===
Luvsansharav was a staunch opponent of Prime Minister Peljidiin Genden, openly challenging many of his decisions and looking for opportunities to undercut him. He led calls within MPRP Central Committee for the prime minister's dismissal after Genden had confronted Stalin in contentious meetings, refusing to persecute Mongolia's Buddhist Church, publicly calling him a Russian tsar, and even slapping the pipe from Stalin's mouth during a Mongolian Embassy reception. Within four months Genden was stripped of all his government positions and sent off to the USSR "for medical treatment." He was arrested and executed a year later for counterrevolutionary activities and spying for Japan.

=== Extraordinary Purge Commission (1937–1939) ===
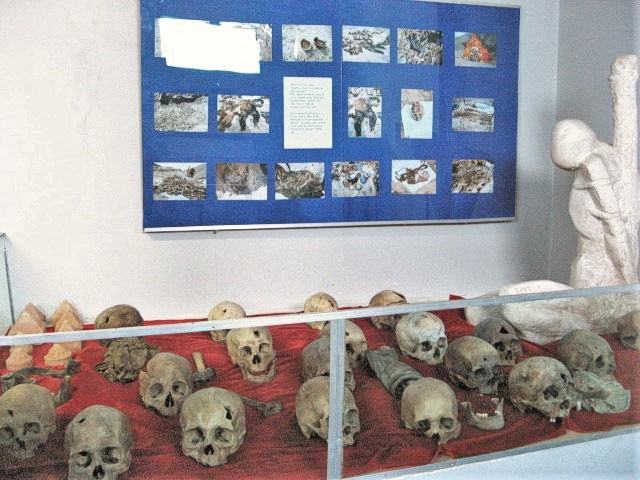
Skulls of murdered lamas at the Memorial Museum of Victims of Political Repression in Ulaanbaatar

In 1937 Luvsansharav received five months of political and organizational training in Moscow to prepare him to manage the purges that Stalin was planning to unleash in Mongolia. On 2 October 1937, he was appointed one of three members (along with Interior Minister Khorloogiin Choibalsan and Minister of Justice Tserendorj) of the Extraordinary Purge Commission or troika, that presided over arrest cases, investigations, and show trials involving "lamas, espionage and counterrevolution." At the first show trial on 18 October 1937, at the Central Theater, thirteen of the fourteen facing the troika, including former prime minister (1921) and chief abbot of the Manzushir Monastery Sambadondogiin Tserendorj, were sentenced to death.

From October 1937 to April 1939, Luvsansharav's troika investigated 25,785 cases and condemned 20,099 persons, including over 16,000 lamas, to execution. 25 persons from the top leadership of the party, 187 persons from the military leadership, and thirty-six of the fifty-one members of the central committee were executed. Although described as an "unremarkable person who rarely attracted notice, a coward with latent sadistic tendencies", Luvsansharav became known as a skilled "extractor of confessions."

=== Purge of Amar (1939) ===
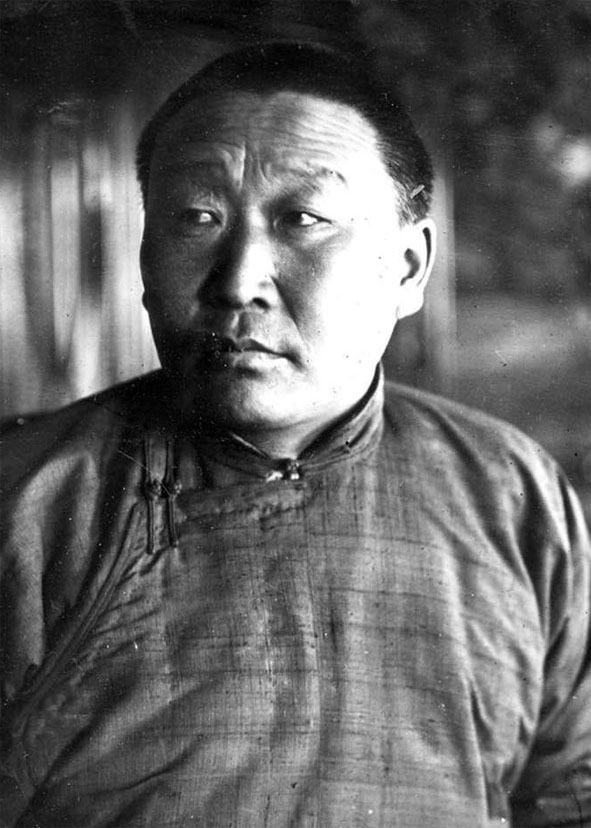
Prime minister Anandyn Amar

By early 1939, Stalin was eager to replace the popular Prime Minister Anandyn Amar with Choibalsan, his new favorite. At meetings with Soviet leadership in Moscow, Choibalsan was instructed to have Luvsansharav launch a propaganda campaign against Amar. Luvsansharav denounced Amar at an enlarged meeting of the MPRP Central Committee on 6 March 1939. Once Choibalsan seconded the condemnation, opinions within the Central Committee rapidly turned against Amar, who was arrested on the spot and transported to Moscow where he was sentenced to death by a Soviet troika on 10 July 1941.

=== End of the purge ===
With most internal opposition extinguished and the threat of Japanese military expansion rising on Mongolia's eastern borders, Stalin ordered Choibalsan to bring the purges to an end. During a special conference at Interior Ministry on 20 April 1939, both Choibalsan and Luvsansharav faked tears of regret for allowing overly zealous Interior Ministry officials and renegade Soviet advisors to carry out the purges. Official blame fell on Deputy Interior Minister Natsantogtoh and Soviet advisor Kichikov.

== Arrest and death ==
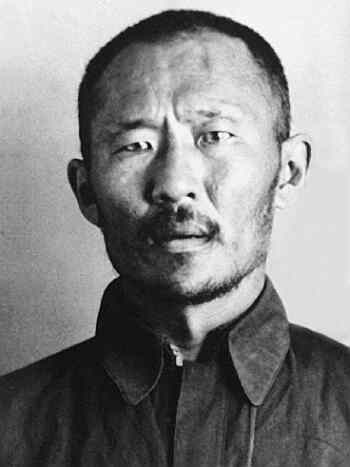
Mugshot of Luvsansharav

In the summer of 1939 most of the "henchmen" of the purges, including Nasantogtoh, Bayasgalan, Dashtseveg and Luvsandorj, were rounded up, arrested, and sent off to Moscow as part of "mop up" operations to eliminate witnesses to the repressions. Luvsansharav was arrested on 9 July 1939, by ministry of internal affairs officials. Charged with counterrevolution, Luvsansharav was transported to Moscow where he was incarcerated in the same prison with former premier Amar before he was found guilty by the Military Collegium of the USSR Supreme Court on 5 July and executed at the Kommunarka shooting ground on 30 July 1941.

== Rehabilitation ==
Despite Luvsansharav's active role in carrying out the purges (Mongolian historian Baabar believes Soviet leaders had eyed Luvsansharav as a potential replacement for Choibalsan should the latter fail to carry out Moscow's instructions on the purges), he was nevertheless viewed as a victim by the special commission established under the presidium of the People's Great Khural to review purge cases of the 1930s and 1940s and was rehabilitated in 1962.

== Notes ==
Party political offices
Preceded by Ölziitiin Badrakh; Peljidiin Genden; Zolbingiin Shijee	Secretary of the Mongolian People's Revolutionary Party; 30 June 1932 - 9 July 1939; Served alongside: Bat-Ochiryn Eldev-Ochir (1932–37); Jambyn Lkhümbe (1932–33); Khas-Ochiryn Luvsandorj (1934–36); Banzarjavyn Baasanjav (1936–40)	Succeeded by Dashiin Damba
