= Jambyn Lkhümbe =

Mongolian statesman

- Жамбын Лхүмбэ
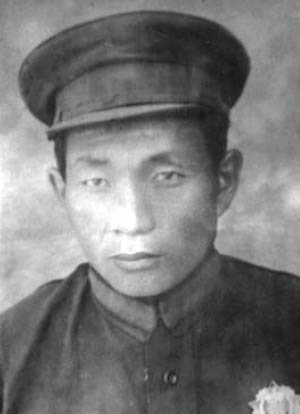

Secretary of the Central Committee of the Mongolian People's Revolutionary Party
- In office 30 June 1932 – July 1933 Serving with Bat-Ochiryn Eldev-Ochir; Dorjjavyn Luvsansharav
- Preceded by: Ölziitiin Badrakh; Peljidiin Genden; Zolbingiin Shijee
- Succeeded by: Khas-Ochiryn Luvsandorj

Personal details
- Born: 1902
- Died: 30 June 1934 (aged 31–32) Ulaanbaatar, Mongolia
- Party: Mongolian People’s Revolutionary Party (1926–1934)

Jambyn Lkhümbe (Mongolian: Жамбын Лхүмбэ; 1902 – 30 June 1934) was a member of the Presidium (or Politburo) of the Central Committee of the Mongolian People's Revolutionary Party (MPRP) from 1930 to 1933 and served as Secretary of the MPRP Central Committee from 1932 to 1933. Lkhümbe was arrested in 1933 and accused of being the ringleader of a counterrevolutionary group conspiring to turn Mongolia into a Japanese protectorate. The ensuing "Lhümbe Case" resulted in the purge of numerous high-ranking politicians and military officers, with particular emphasis placed on the persecution of Buryat-Mongols. He was found guilty on June 25, 1934, and he was executed on June 30, 1934.

== Career ==
Lkhümbe was born in 1902 in present-day Khairkhandulaan district, Övörkhangai Province in central Mongolia. After receiving training at the MPRP Party School in Ulaanbaatar (1926-1927) he then became the school's director in 1928. Lkhümbe was one of several younger, more radicalized party members from rural areas (others included Tsengeltiin Jigjidjav, Ölziin Badrakh, Zolbingiin Shijee, Bat-Ochiryn Eldev-Ochir, and Peljidiin Genden) recruited by the Soviets in the late 1920s to challenge the MRPR "old guard" of Balingiin Tserendorj, Tseren-Ochiryn Dambadorj, and Anandyn Amar. In 1929 Lkhümbe joined the Internal Security Directorate but soon thereafter departed for Moscow to attend the Communist University of the Toilers of the East from 1929 to 1930. In 1930 he became Chairman of the Central Council of Trade Unions and was elected to the Presidium of the MPRP Central Committee.

In April 1932, Lkhümbe headed a plenipotentiary commission that brutally suppressed an armed insurgency in Khövsgöl Province. Lkhümbe's troops torched the town of Rashaant, destroyed the monastery where the rebellion had originated, and ordered the immediate execution of 54 of the 204 insurgents that were captured. Government forces, with the assistance of Soviet tanks and aircraft, slowly brought the rebellion under control by the end of summer 1932. Lkhümbe returned to Ulaanbaatar where he was elected one of the three Secretaries of the MPRP Central Committee alongside Bat-Ochiryn Eldev-Ochir and Dorjjavyn Luvsansharav on 30 June 1932.

== Lkhümbe affair ==
Believing the rebellion had been supported in part by the Japanese, Soviet and MPRP leaders grew increasingly alarmed over Japanese intrigue in Mongolia. Hysteria was further stoked in the spring of 1933 when security officials believed they had uncovered a Japanese supported plot to overthrow the government. The "proof", however, was a letter, forged by one low level party functionary to falsely implicate another of collaborating with Japanese spies in the rural Dadal district of northeastern Khentii Province. D. Namsrai, head of the Security Directorate, and his Soviet advisers responded swiftly by establishing a special commission to investigate. When suspects fingered Lkhümbe as the leader of the conspiratorial group, (likely encouraged to do so by their Soviet interrogators), party leader Bat-Ochiryn Eldev-Ochir and Prime Minister Peljidiin Genden consented to his arrest.

Continuing arrests, interrogations, and torture of suspects revealed an ever-widening circle of conspirators, including high-ranking government officials and military officers. Buryat-Mongols, whom the Soviets distrusted as White Russians, came under especially heavy suspicion and Soviet advisers effectively used the investigation to eliminate their influence within Mongolia. In all, several hundred persons were arrested and interrogated, 56 of whom were ultimately executed (including chairman of the state supreme court J. Gonchigsuren, former chairman of the Security Directorate, N. Hayanhyarvaa, and D. Dungarjid, a pregnant woman). 260 were jailed for three to ten years and 126 were sent to the USSR. Of those persecuted, 251 were Buryats.

The case would have lasting repercussions in Mongolia and served as a rehearsal for the even more violent purges that would take place between 1937 and 1939. Khorloogiin Choibalsan and Dorjjavyn Luvsansharav were called to Moscow in 1934 to answer questions about their possible involvement. Choibalsan's enthusiastic cooperation with NKVD agents in interrogating and torturing fellow Mongolians as part of the investigation raised his status in Soviet eyes and led to his later being made Mongolia's leader. Prime Ministers Genden and Amar would eventually be accused of participating in the Lkhümbe conspiracy, purged, and executed. (Amar would earn Stalin's ire for pardoning many of those arrested in the investigation in honor of the fifteenth anniversary of the revolution in 1936). Prime Minister Tsengeltiin Jigjidjav and Marshal Gelegdorjiin Demid were posthumously connected to the case in 1934 and 1937 respectively.

== Death ==
Lkhümbe maintained his innocence in the face of intense interrogation by Soviet agents in Ulaanbaatar and later in Moscow. After his return to Mongolia in January 1934, he allegedly "conceded" his crimes to Party Secretary Dorjjavyn Luvsansharav and Namsrai. He was sentenced to death by the Security Directorate's Special Commission on June 25, 1934, and shot on June 30, 1934.

He was rehabilitated in 1962.

== Notes ==
Party political offices
Preceded by Ölziitiin Badrakh; Peljidiin Genden; Zolbingiin Shijee	Secretary of the Mongolian People's Revolutionary Party; 30 June 1932 - July 1933; Served alongside: B.Eldev-Ochir; D.Luvsansharav	Succeeded by Khas-Ochiryn Luvsandorj
