= Bat-Ochiryn Eldev-Ochir =

Mongolian politician

- Бат-Очирын Элдэв-Очир
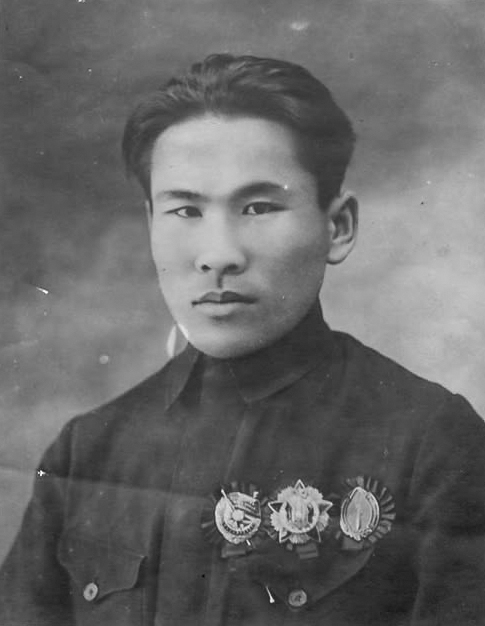
- Eldev-Ochir in the 1930s

General Secretary of the Central Committee of the Mongolian People's Party
- In office January 30, 1929 – March 13, 1930
- Preceded by: Ölziin Badrakh
- Succeeded by: Peljidiin Genden

General Secretary of the Central Committee of the Mongolian People's Party
- In office June 30, 1932 – July 30, 1932
- Preceded by: Zolbingiin Shijee
- Succeeded by: Jambyn Lkhümbe

Personal details
- Born: 1905 Zasagt Province, Outer Mongolia, Qing China
- Died: 1937 (aged 31–32) Moscow, Soviet Union
- Party: Mongolian People’s Revolutionary Party (1922–1937)

Bat-Ochiryn Eldev-Ochir (Mongolian: Бат-Очирын Элдэв-Очир; 1905–1937) was a prominent political figure in early years of the Mongolian People's Republic who, between 1928 and 1937, was one of three secretaries of the Central Committee of the Mongolian People's Revolutionary Party (MPRP). He served as the party's First Secretary from 1929 to 1930 and again for a month in 1932. As party leader, Eldev-Ochir pushed for rapid implementation of socialist policies (forced collectivization and property confiscation) during the “Leftist” period of the early 1930s, led the persecution of institutional Buddhism in Mongolia, and backed Soviet-sponsored purges of counterrevolutionary elements, particularly Buryat-Mongols, during the Lkhümbe affair in 1934-1935. He died in 1937 after being injured in a car crash.

== Early life and career ==
Eldev-Ochir was born in 1905 in Zasagt Khan Province where, from 1922 to 1925, he was leader of the local cell of the Mongolian Revolutionary Youth League (MYRL). In the mid-1920s, he was recruited by Comintern agents looking for younger, more radical, and preferably “rural” party members to challenge the authority of “old guard” revolutionaries such as Prime Minister Balingiin Tserendorj, Deputy Prime Minister Anandyn Amar, and Party Chairman Tseren-Ochiryn Dambadorj. Eldev-Ochir officially joined the MPRP in 1925, enrolled in the MPRP Party School in Ulaanbaatar, and then went on to attend the Communist University of the Toilers of the East in the USSR, graduating in 1928.

At the 1928 Seventh Party Congress, Comintern agents (including the American William F. Dunne) orchestrated the removal of rightist leaders and ensured the election of leftists such as Eldev-Ochir, Peljidiin Genden, and Ölziin Badrakh as secretaries of the party Central Committee. Eldev-Ochir was also elected to the Presidium of the MPRP, despite opposition from MYRL delegates who accused his wife of being “a true feudal.” Eldev-Ochir rejected demands that he divorce her.

=== Leftist deviation ===
From 1929 to 1932, Eldev-Ochir supported policies (advocated by the Soviets) that rapidly transitioned the country from the “democratic” to the “socialist” stage of the revolution. One third of Mongolian livestock was decimated as herders were forced onto collective farms. Private trade was suppressed and property of both the nobility and the Buddhist church was seized. Over 800 properties belonging to the nobility and the Buddhist church were confiscated and over 700 head of mostly noble households were executed.

In March 1930, Eldev-Ochir was appointed head of the Internal Security Directorate and ordered to suppress uprisings against the government’s unpopular policies by lamas at Tögsbuyant and Ulaangom monasteries in Uvs Province. He and a Soviet trainer commanded the fourth cavalry out of Khovd that swiftly and brutally defeated the lamas. Eldev-Ochir ordered the on-the-spot execution of 30 leaders of the rebellion. During the fighting however Eldev-Ochir's car was overturned and he suffered a neck injury.

=== New Turn policy ===
Eldev-Ochir's swift defeat of the Uvs revolt failed to prevent further violent uprisings from spreading across western Mongolia in 1932. In response, Moscow ordered the curtailment of socialist policies and purged several MPRP leaders (including Badrah, Shijee, and Prime Minister Tsengeltiin Jigjidjav) as agents of “Leftist Deviation” in May 1932. Although he was party leader, Eldev-Ochir managed to avoid Soviet retribution. He and Khorloogiin Choibalsan were portrayed as being the first to criticize of the policies' excesses. Genden, who was also closely associated with the leftist policies, nevertheless managed to be appointed prime minister in 1932 after securing Josef Stalin’s favor. Eldev-Ochir was reelected party secretary (along with Dorjjavyn Luvsansharav and Khas-Ochiryn Luvsandorj) at the Ninth Party Congress 1934 and again in 1937 (this time with Luvsansharav and Banzarjavyn Baasanjav).

=== Lkhümbe Affair ===
see: Lhümbe Case

In spring 1933 Prime Minister Genden and Eldev-Ochir consented to the arrest of party secretary Jambyn Lkhümbe in the wake of spurious allegations that he was head of a Japanese spy ring plotting the government's overthrow. The subsequent investigation, known as the " Lkhümbe Affair," implicated hundreds of Mongolians and resulted in the purge of numerous high ranking politicians and military officers, particularly Buryat-Mongols.

=== Persecution of the Buddhist Church ===
In 1935 Eldev-Ochir took charge of an extraordinary commission on religion through which the Central Committee continued its persecution of the Buddhist Church. Laws were adopted and rigorously enforced that broke the authority and independence of the Church: disputes were now settled by public courts, religious administrations were oppressively regulated, and religious services were ordered to be read in Mongolian rather than traditional Tibetan. Monasteries that were found to be non-compliant were severely punished or shut down altogether. Eldev-Ochir often attended Saturday meetings at monasteries where he praised revolutionary principals or threatened monasteries with closure.

=== Purge of Genden ===
By 1935 it was clear that Genden had lost the backing of Stalin, who was unhappy with the slow pace of the MPRP's war against the lamas. At a plenary meeting of the MPRP in March 1936, Genden, accused of sabotaging Mongol-Soviet relations, was stripped of his offices of prime minister and foreign minister and sent to the USSR "for medical treatment." Under house arrest at the Black Sea resort town of Foros, Genden was desperate to return to Mongolia and at one point reached out to Eldev-Ochir, who was vacationing in nearby Yalta, for assistance. Eldev-Ochir took no action. Genden was executed in November 1937.

=== Death ===
Around the same time it is believed that Eldev-Ochir died a premature death. Although details of the last year of his life are scarce, it was originally thought that he was the victim of the large scale Soviet purges that took place in Mongolia between 1932 and 1939. Later information suggested he had died in a Moscow hospital after falling from a moving vehicle during a hunting trip.

== Notes ==
Party political offices
Preceded by Ölziin Badrakh	First Secretary of the Central Committee; January 30, 1929 - March 13, 1930	Succeeded by Peljidiin Genden
Preceded by Zolbingiin Shijee	First Secretary of the Central Committee; June 30, 1932 - July 30, 1932	Succeeded by Jambyn Lkhümbe
Political offices
