= Anandyn Amar =

Prime minister of Mongolia (1886 – 1941)

- Анандын Амар
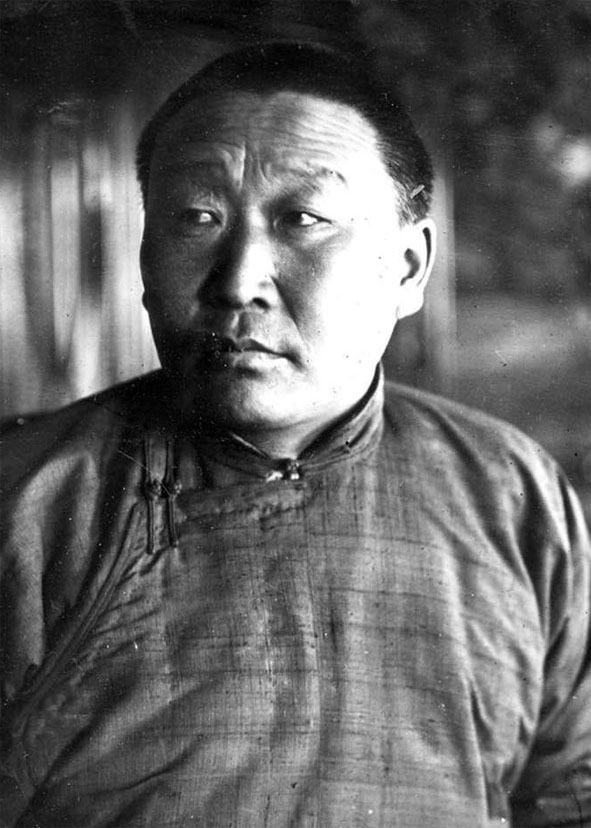

7th & 10th Prime Minister of Mongolia
- In office 21 February 1928 – 27 April 1930
- General Secretary: Tseren-Ochiryn Dambadorj; Ölziin Badrakh; Bat-Ochiryn Eldev-Ochir; Peljidiin Genden
- Preceded by: Balingiin Tserendorj
- Succeeded by: Tsengeltiin Jigjidjav
- In office 22 March 1936 – 7 March 1939
- General Secretary: Khas-Ochiryn Luvsandorj; Banzarjavyn Baasanjav
- Preceded by: Peljidiin Genden
- Succeeded by: Khorloogiin Choibalsan

6th Chairman of the Presidium of the State Little Hural
- In office 2 July 1932 – 22 March 1936
- General Secretary: Bat-Ochiryn Eldev-Ochir; Jambyn Lkhümbe; Dorjjavyn Luvsansharav; Khas-Ochiryn Luvsandorj
- Preceded by: Losolyn Laagan
- Succeeded by: Dansrabilegiin Dogsom

Personal details
- Born: 1886 Khangal District, Bulgan Province, Outer Mongolia, Qing dynasty
- Died: July 10, 1941 (aged 56–57) Kommunarka shooting ground, Leninsky District, Moscow Oblast, Russian SFSR, USSR
- Party: Mongolian People's Revolutionary Party (1923–1939)

Anandyn Amar (Mongolian: Анандын Амар; 1886 – July 10, 1941) was the head of state of the Mongolian People's Republic from 1932 to 1936 and twice served as prime minister from 1928–1930 and again from 1936–1939. A widely respected politician, Amar was known for his eloquent defense of Mongolian independence in the face of increasing Soviet domination. Despite this, he proved powerless in preventing Minister of Interior Khorloogiin Choibalsan and the Soviet NKVD from carrying out mass purges of nearly 30,000 Mongolians during his second term as prime minister between 1937 and 1939. Amar's popularity ultimately led to his purge by the pro-Soviet Choibalsan, who had him charged with counterrevolution in 1939. Amar was sent to Moscow for trial and executed on July 10, 1941.

== Early life and career ==
Amar (literally meaning "peace/peaceful" in the Mongolian language) was born in 1886 in the present-day Khangal district of Bulgan Province (then called Daichin Van Khoshuu in Tüsheet Khan Province) in north-central Mongolia. The son of a poor nobleman, the "khokhi taij" or "impoverished prince" Anand, Amar studied Mongolian, Manchu, and Classical Tibetan in the Khoshuu school. He then worked his way up from being a local official to a position in the foreign ministry of Autonomous Mongolia from 1913 to 1919.

He joined the Mongolian People's Party in 1923, and was elected to the Presidium (Politburo) of the MPRP Central Committee in August 1924. He also served concurrently as a member of the 1st through 7th Little Khurals. From 1923 to 1928, Amar served as deputy prime minister while also holding various other government portfolios at different times, including minister of foreign affairs, minister of internal affairs, and president of the economic council.

== Prime minister (first term) ==
Amar was appointed prime minister on February 21, 1928, following the death of Balingiin Tserendorj. The Soviets, already suspicious of the prestige he enjoyed in Mongolia, curtailed his authority by promptly assigning him to work in the Institute of Manuscripts. Amar's first term as prime minister ended on April 27, 1930.

From 1930 to 1932, he was chairman of the science committee, during which time he authored two books: The Tenth Anniversary and Scientific Production (1931) and On the Development of the Mongolian National Script (1933). From 1932 to 1936, he served as chairman of the presidium of the Little Khural (the titular head of state).

== Short History of Mongolia ==
In 1934, he authored the Short History of Mongolia. In the prologue, he wrote:

"It is truly unbearably sad that the Mongol ethnicity, despite having since ancient times and especially in the time of Genghis Khan run a glorious path of development among the countries of Asia and Europe, should in these latter days have been divided into many parts, with some unable to protect and safeguard their ethnic roots, customs, land and property, revering a powerful foreign entity while not having any power or policy to carry out their own affairs or accomplish pertinent actions, not only subjecting themselves to others' authority but actually striving to accomplish the policies and interests of foreign entities. Imperialist nations such as the Manj (Manchus) and Khyatad (Chinese), who have historically tried to convert the Mongol nation into their trading shops and establish their own sole hegemony while fixing prices at their own whim for exploitative purposes, are now at this very moment fighting amongst each other to convert our own nationally identical Inner Mongolia into their trading shop. And so it is that the Mongol nation of animal husbandry (Inner and Outer Mongolia) has fallen so low as to meet the fate of becoming a trading shop of other nations."

== Prime minister (second term) ==
Amar was appointed prime minister for the second time (and concurrently foreign minister) on March 22, 1936, following Peljidiin Genden's removal from both offices. Genden had resisted Soviet pressure to destroy Mongolia's Buddhist churches and had publicly scolded Joseph Stalin at a Mongolian Embassy reception. Although Amar was the new prime minister, Khorloogiin Choibalsan became Stalin's new favorite and, as head of the newly created Internal Affairs Ministry, was the de facto most powerful person in Mongolia. Choibalsan increased his power in May 1936 when he had the Internal Affairs Committee rules amended to facilitate the detention of high-ranking politicians without first consulting political superiors.

Shortly after becoming prime minister in 1936, Amar and Dansranbilegiin Dogsom, the chairman of the presidium of the Little Khural, aggravated Choibalsan and Moscow alike when they pardoned prisoners implicated in the Lkhümbe Affair in honor of the fifteenth anniversary of the revolution. Amar's enemies, particularly Choibalsan, used the event to connect him to the fictitious Lkhümbe spy ring. Amar was increasingly accused of participating in counterrevolutionary activity, causing Choibalsan to exclaim, "We must get rid of this feudal trouble maker Amar!"

=== Stalinist repressions ===
Amar was powerless to prevent the large-scale purges that Choibalsan and NKVD advisers embedded within the interior ministry unleashed on the country from 1937 to 1939. At the first show trial, staged at the Central Theater from October 18 to 20, 1937, Amar openly wept as close friends were sentenced to death.

=== Purged ===
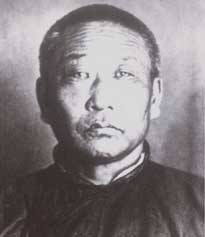
Mugshot of Amar Anand

Because of Amar's continued popularity among Mongolians, Stalin was eager to eliminate him. He instructed Choibalsan to have party leader Dorjjavyn Luvsansharav launch a propaganda campaign against the popular prime minister. On March 6, 1939, Luvsansharav denounced Amar at an enlarged meeting of the MPRP Central Committee, saying he "had helped anti-government plotters, opposed their arrest, and neglected the defense of the borders. He betrayed his own country and was a traitor to the revolution." Once Choibalsan seconded the condemnation, opinions within the Central Committee rapidly turned against Amar.

When Amar took the floor in his own defense he said:

"Although I believe in religion, the one thing that I believe in even more is that Mongolia should stand firmly on her feet to become an independent country. I love my country. I have shown this with my work. I have been among the first to devote myself to the cause of my country's development, and my heart is breaking to finally witness myself being called a traitor and being subjected to castigation."

Amar was found guilty at the end of the one-day trial. He was removed from the office of prime minister, expelled from the MPRP, and then arrested by the Ministry of Internal Affairs. In July 1939, Amar's case passed to the NKVD, and Amar was sent to the Siberian town of Chita and then on to Moscow. With Amar's removal, Choibalsan was named prime minister and became Mongolia's uncontested leader, simultaneously holding the offices of prime minister, minister for internal affairs, minister of war, and Commander in Chief of the Mongolian armed forces.

== Trial and execution ==
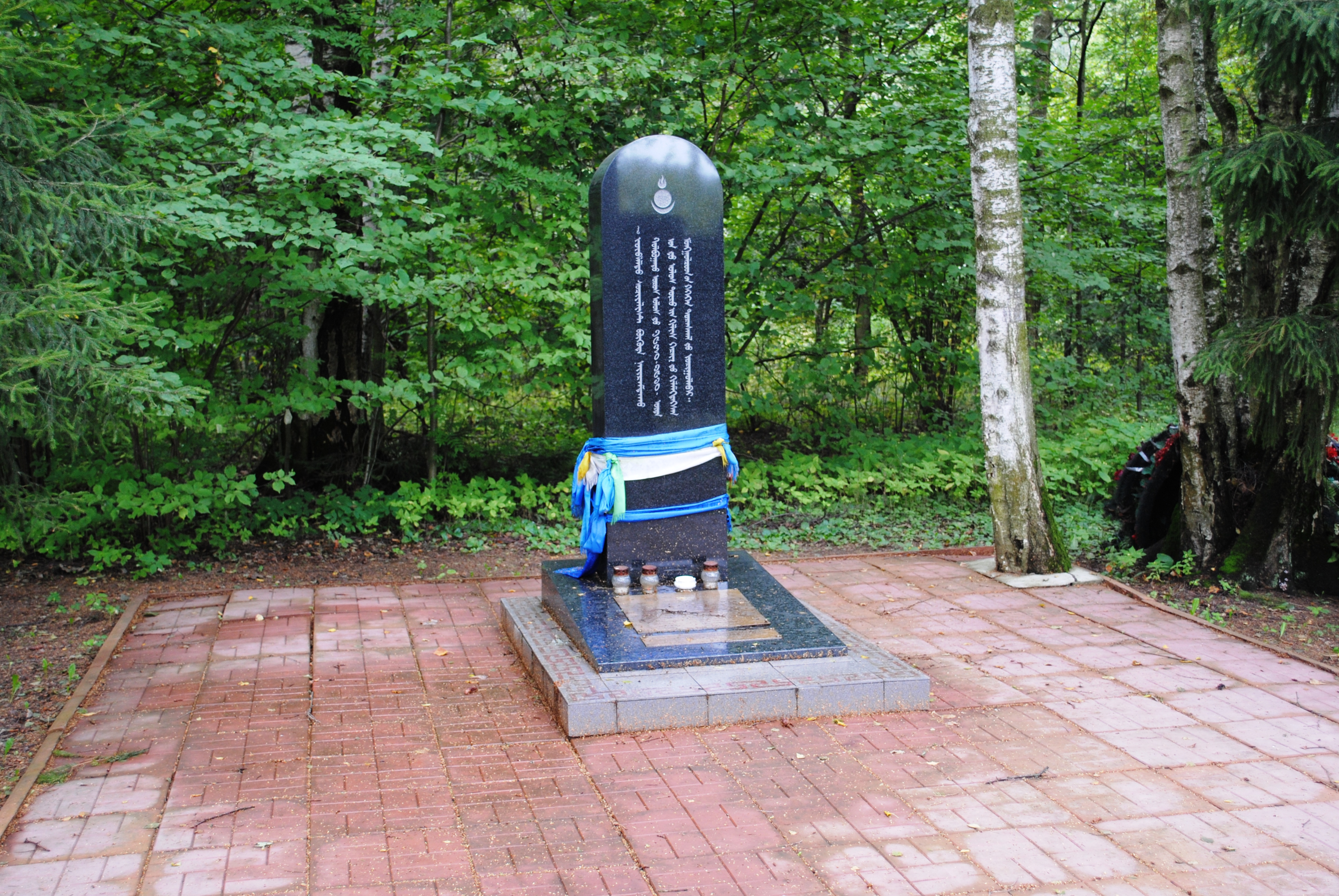
Memorial obelisk at the Kommunarka execution site in Moscow, Russia, commemorating the Mongolian victims, including Amar

Ironically, while awaiting trial in Moscow, Amar was jailed with Luvsansharav, the very same person who had arrested him and who had also fallen victim to Choibalsan's purges shortly thereafter.

On July 10, 1941, Amar was tried by a Soviet troika and sentenced to death. Throughout the trial, Amar insisted that, if the Mongolian People's Republic were really an independent nation, he should be tried by a Mongolian court. His last recorded words were, "It is typical that when a big power colonizes a small country, its leaders are arrested and persecuted. My personal experience demonstrates this attitude of the USSR towards Mongolia."

He was immediately executed at the Kommunarka shooting ground near Moscow; his body is buried there.

== Rehabilitation ==
On December 15, 1956, after reviewing Stalin's purges, military collegiums found no evidence of Amar's guilt. On January 25, 1962, he was rehabilitated, and on September 26, 1989, his membership in the MPRP was restored.

== Sources ==
- Baabar, B., History of Mongolia, 1999, ISBN 99929-0-038-5.

Political offices
Preceded by Balingiin Tserendorj	Prime Minister of Mongolia; 1928–1930	Succeeded by Tsengeltiin Jigjidjav
Preceded by Losolyn Laagan	President of Mongolia; 1932–1936	Succeeded by Dansranbilegiin Dogsom
Preceded by Peljidiin Genden	Prime Minister of Mongolia; 1936–1939	Succeeded by Khorloogiin Choibalsan
