= 1932 armed uprising in Mongolia =

Revolt against the Mongolian People's Revolutionary Party

- Part of the Stalinist repressions in Mongolia
Date	April 11 – October 1932 (6 months)
Location	Khövsgöl, Arkhangai, Zavkhan, Övörkhangai, Gobi-Altai, Bayankhongor
Result	Mongolian government victory; Rebel leaders captured; Strengthening of anti-religious policies; Continuation of the Stalinist repressions in Mongolia

Belligerents
Buddhist clergy, cattle owners, individual partyworkers	Mongolian People's Republic; Soviet Union

Units involved
Rebel bands	Mongolian People's Revolutionary Army; Ministry of Internal Affairs; Internal Security Directorate; Red Army

Strength
~1,500+	~1,300; 5 tanks; 10 armored cars; 3 R-1 planes; 10 R-5 planes

Casualties and losses
- 1,500+ killed

The 1932 armed uprising (Mongolian: 1932 оны зэвсэгт бослого, romanized: 1932 ony zevsegt boslogo) in Mongolia, also known as the Khuvsgul Uprising (Хөвсгөлийн бослого, Khövsgöliyn boslogo) was a popular revolt against the "left course" policies of the Mongolian People's Revolutionary Party (MPRP) as directed by Soviet Bolsheviks and Comintern agents in the Mongolian People's Republic. Principally led by lamas, the uprisings covered the northwest part of the country and lasted from April to November 1932. Most rebels consisted of common herders but even many party members and the local bureaucrats joined the rebellion. The insurgents were spurred on by rumors of support from the 9th Panchen Lama and the Japanese. More than 1,500 people were killed in the violence as both insurgents and Soviet-backed Mongolian troops sent to quell the rebellion engaged in atrocities. Special study revealed that this uprising corresponds to generally accepted criteria of civil war. Suggestions that the uprising was inspired or supported by Japan or the Panchen Lama are not confirmed by archival documents.

== Background ==
Bat-Ochiryn Eldev-Ochir

From 1929 to 1932, the MPRP, with Soviet oversight, implemented policies that rapidly transitioned the country to the socialist stage of the revolution. Private trade was suppressed and over 800 properties belonging to the bourgeoisie and the Buddhist church were confiscated and over 700 head of mostly bourgeoisie households were executed. Refugees streamed across the border into Inner Mongolia and Xinjiang as scattered local uprisings erupted between February and April 1930 in different areas of southern and south-western Mongolia. In March 1930, Bat-Ochiryn Eldev-Ochir, a rising star of the MPRP's left wing, was appointed head of the Internal Security Directorate and ordered to suppress uprisings by lamas at Tögsbuyant and Ulaangom monasteries in Uvs Province. He and a Soviet trainer commanded the fourth cavalry out of Khovd that swiftly defeated the lamas. Eldev-Ochir ordered the on-the-spot execution of 30 leaders of the rebellion.

== Outline of events ==
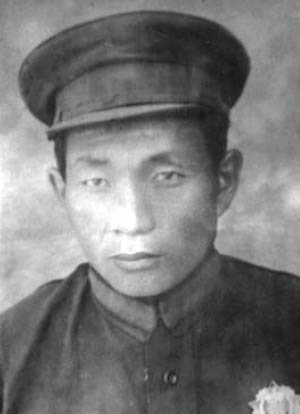
Jambyn Lkhümbe

The swift defeat of the Uvs revolt failed to prevent further violent uprisings from spreading across western Mongolia in 1932. The main uprising began on April 10 or 11th 1932 centered at the Khyalganat monastery of Rashaant sum in Khövsgöl aimag, and spread quickly to neighboring monasteries. The insurgents established a high command under the name "Ochirbat's Military ministry" (Mongolian: Очирбатын Цэргийн яам), and began arming the local lamas and laypeople, burning down collective and sum centers, and assassinating opponents, especially local officials and party and youth league members who actively sought to repress institutional Buddhism in favor of socialism.

The rebellion quickly spread to Arkhangai, Övörkhangai, Zavkhan and Dörböt aimags. The Mongolian government responded by establishing an extraordinary commission headed by Jambyn Lkhümbe and deploying Interior Ministry armed units on April 15/16th. Lkhümbe's troops torched the town of Rashaant, destroyed Khyalganat monastery where the rebellion had originated, and ordered the immediate execution of 54 of the 204 insurgents that were captured. Government forces, with the assistance of Soviet tanks and aircraft, gradually brought the rebellion under control by the end of summer 1932. Through June and July 614 rebels were killed and another 1,500 arrested during the course of 15 battles. Lkhümbe returned to Ulaanbaatar where, in recognition of his efforts, he was elected First Secretary of the MPRP Central Committee on July 30, 1932. In August, however, the rebellion resumed in southern Khövsgöl and northern Arkhangai aimags. It is supposed that the Mongolian rebels have connection with similar uprising in Tuva. The uprising was suppressed by November 1932.

The uprising covered an area of about 155,000 km^{2}. The garrison town of Tsetserleg, population 1,195 people, joined the rebellion. In general, most of the rebels were common herdsmen. In Övörkhangai aimag, 90% members of the Mongolian People's Revolutionary Party and the Revolutionary Youth Union joined the rebels, as well as 95% of collective farms. Rebel fighting units numbered from dozens to thousands of men. They were armed mainly with flintlocks and antique rifles. Government troops numbered just a few hundred men but were better armed with modern rifles, machine guns, grenades, mountain artillery, armored cars, and planes provided by the USSR. Soviet troops were not introduced, but military advisers participated in some battles.

== Results ==
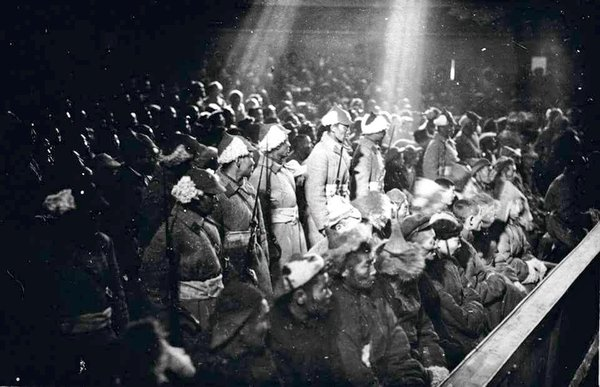
The trial of the participants of the armed uprising in 1933

The uprising covered the country's four most populated aimags (Khövsgöl, Arkhangai, Övörkhangai, Zavkhan, Dörböt, partly Altai and Southern Govi). The numbers are quite fragmentary but more than 3,000 people are said to have participated on the side of the insurgents, and they are said to have killed more than 700 people between April and July 1932. According to a short-time chairman of the Defense Council, D. Ölziibat, 500 insurgents were killed in 16 battles, and 615 insurgents were condemned to death by drumhead courts-martial. 35 sum centers and 45 cooperatives were destroyed. According to one Soviet document, 8,000-10,000 people were killed. Total number of people killed by insurgents is many times less than the total number of victims of the uprising.

== Aftermath ==
Following the violent uprisings, Moscow ordered a curtailment of the unpopular leftist initiatives and pinned the blame for the excesses of what became known as the "Leftist Deviation" on hard-line leftists within the MPRP leadership, including Zolbingiin Shijee, Ölziin Badrakh, and Prime Minister Tsengeltiin Jigjidjav. All were officially expelled from the party in May 1932. The government instituted a "new course" policy in which anti-religious policies were eased after June 1932 and collectivization was suspended. Nevertheless, by this point the Mongolian nobility had effectively been destroyed, and the political moderation would prove to be only a temporary respite: the Buddhist church would be almost completely eradicated in the Stalinist purges of the late 1930s, and livestock would be collectivized again in the 1950s.

== See also ==
- Great Repressions in Mongolia
- Lhümbe Case
- War in the Vendée, in France
- 1971 JVP insurrection, in Ceylon (now Sri Lanka)
