= Taragt, Övörkhangai =

District in Övörkhangai Province, Mongolia

Coordinates: 46°18′06″N 102°26′51″E

Taragt District Тарагт сум ᠲᠠᠷᠠᠭᠲᠤᠰᠤᠮᠤ
- District
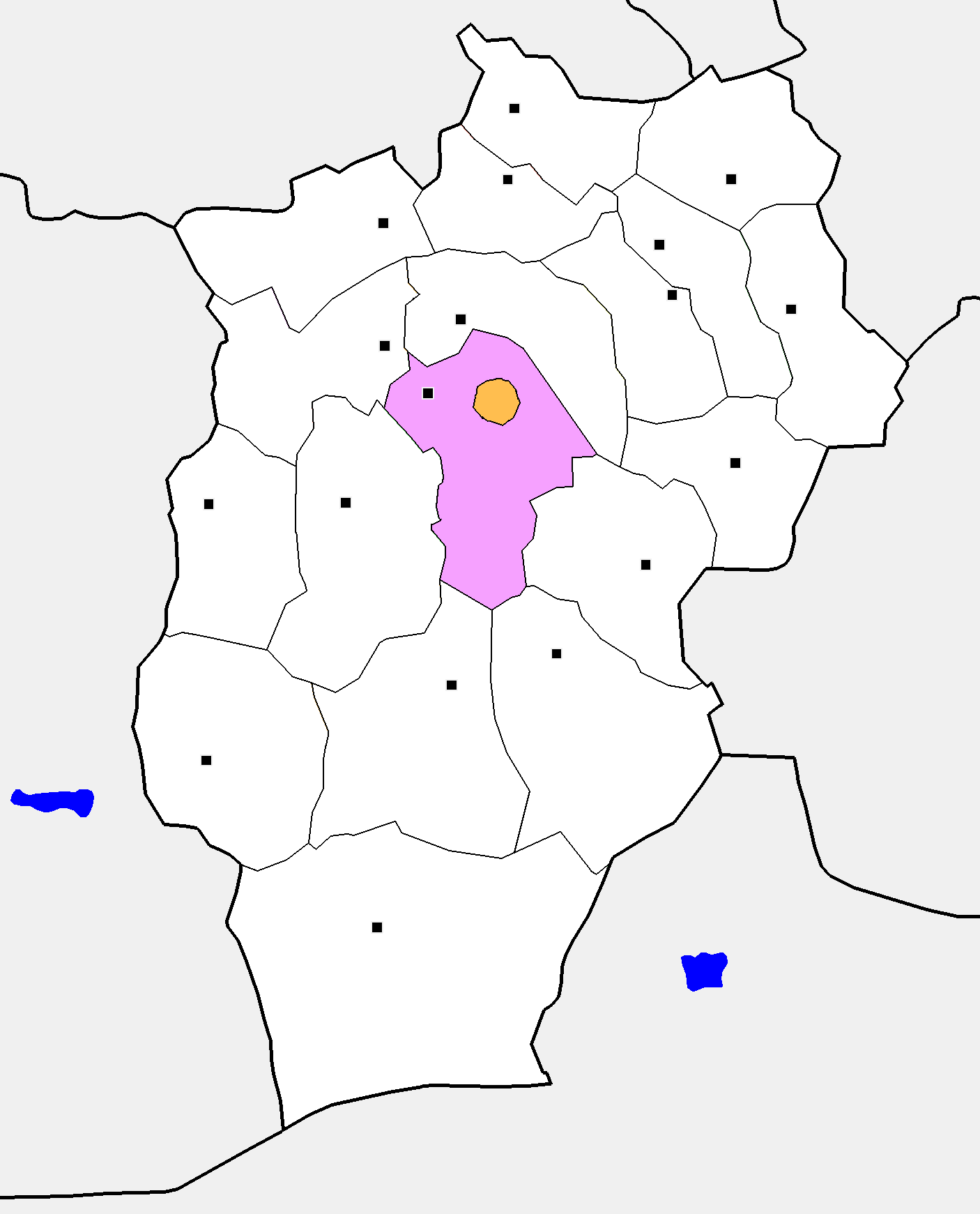
- Taragt District in Övörkhangai Province
- Country: Mongolia
- Province: Övörkhangai Province
- Time zone: UTC+8 (UTC + 8)

Taragt (Mongolian: Тарагт "Thick Milk") is a sum (district) of Övörkhangai Province in southern Mongolia. In 2008, its population was 3,313.

Peljidiin Genden was born in present-day Taragt sum.

== Administrative divisions ==
The district is divided into six bags, which are:

- Altantal
- Arvaintal
- Ikh bulag
- Khuremt
- Tuyaa
- Urt
