= Danzandarjaa Monastery =

Monastery in Mörön, Khövsgöl, Mongolia

Gandandarjaalin Monastery Гандандаржаалин хийд
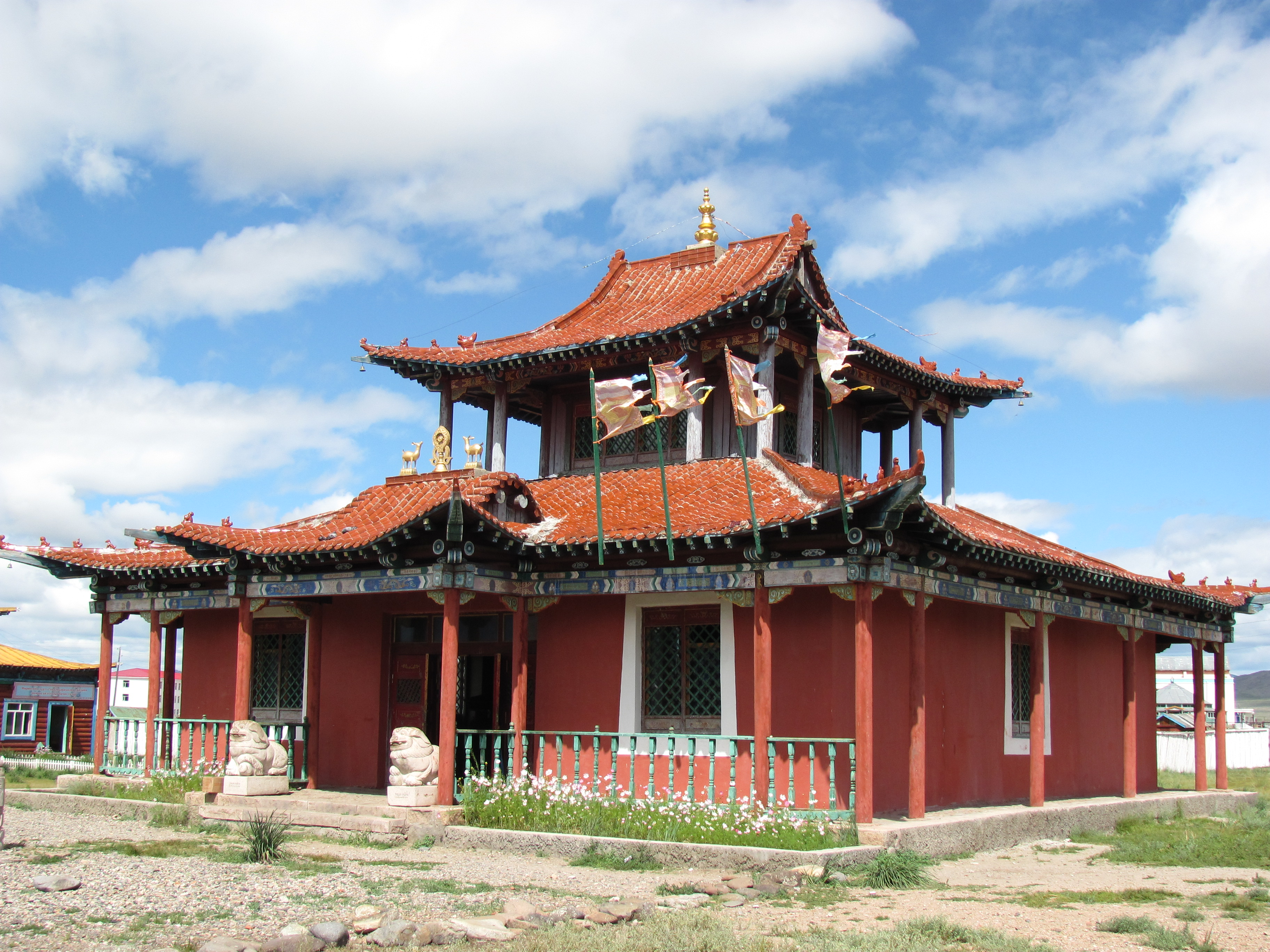

- Location within Mongolia

Religion
- Affiliation: Tibetan Buddhism

Location
- Location: Mörön, Khövsgöl Province, Mongolia
- Country: Mongolia
- Interactive map of Gandandarjaalin Monastery; Гандандаржаалин хийд
- Coordinates: 49°38′19.36″N 100°8′40.63″E

Architecture
- Style: Mongol and Tibetan influences
- Established: 1809

Gandandarjaalin Monastery (Mongolian: Гадандаржаалин хийд, Gandandarjaalin Khiid) is a small monastery built in the 1990s in Mörön, Khövsgöl Province to replace the original and much larger Mörön Monastery (Möröngiin Khuree) which was destroyed in 1937.

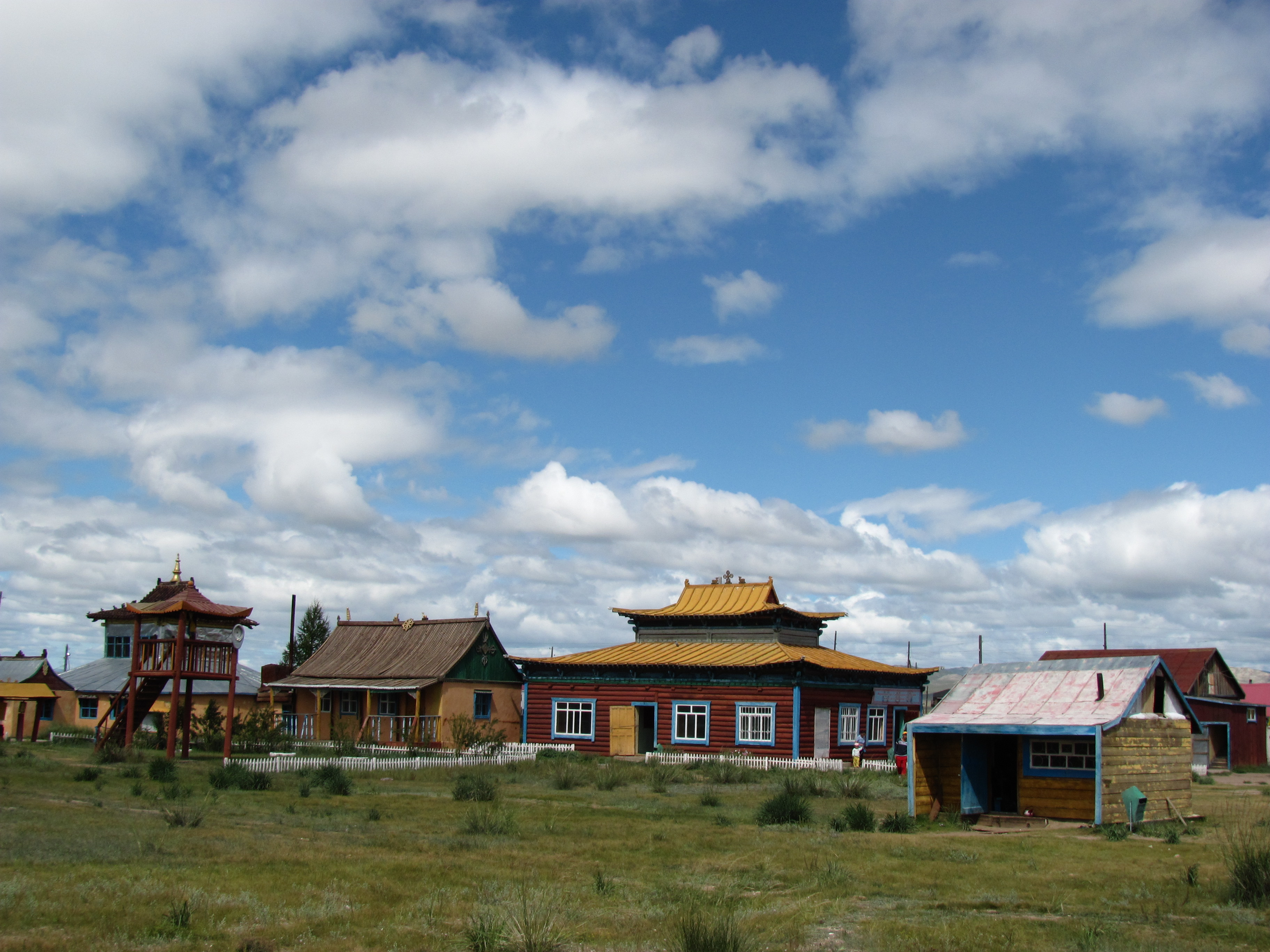
GanDandarjaalin Khiid, partial view

The town of Mörön grew around the monastic complex, founded in 1809–11 on the banks of the Delgermörön river. At its height in the early 20th century the monastery was home to 2000 monks. Dorjjavyn Luvsansharav, a leader of the Mongolia People's Revolutionary Party during the violent Stalinist repressions in Mongolia, studied at the monastery between 1910 and 1921. In the late 1930s Luvsansharav directed a brutal persecution of the Buddhist Church in Mongolia that resulted in the closure and destruction of over 700 monasteries, including Mörön Monastery, destroyed in 1937.

After the 1990 Democratic Revolution in Mongolia the monastery was rebuilt on the western edge of the town and reopened in June 1990. It now houses up to 40 monks of all ages and contains an impressive collection of thangka.

Gandandarjaalin Monastery

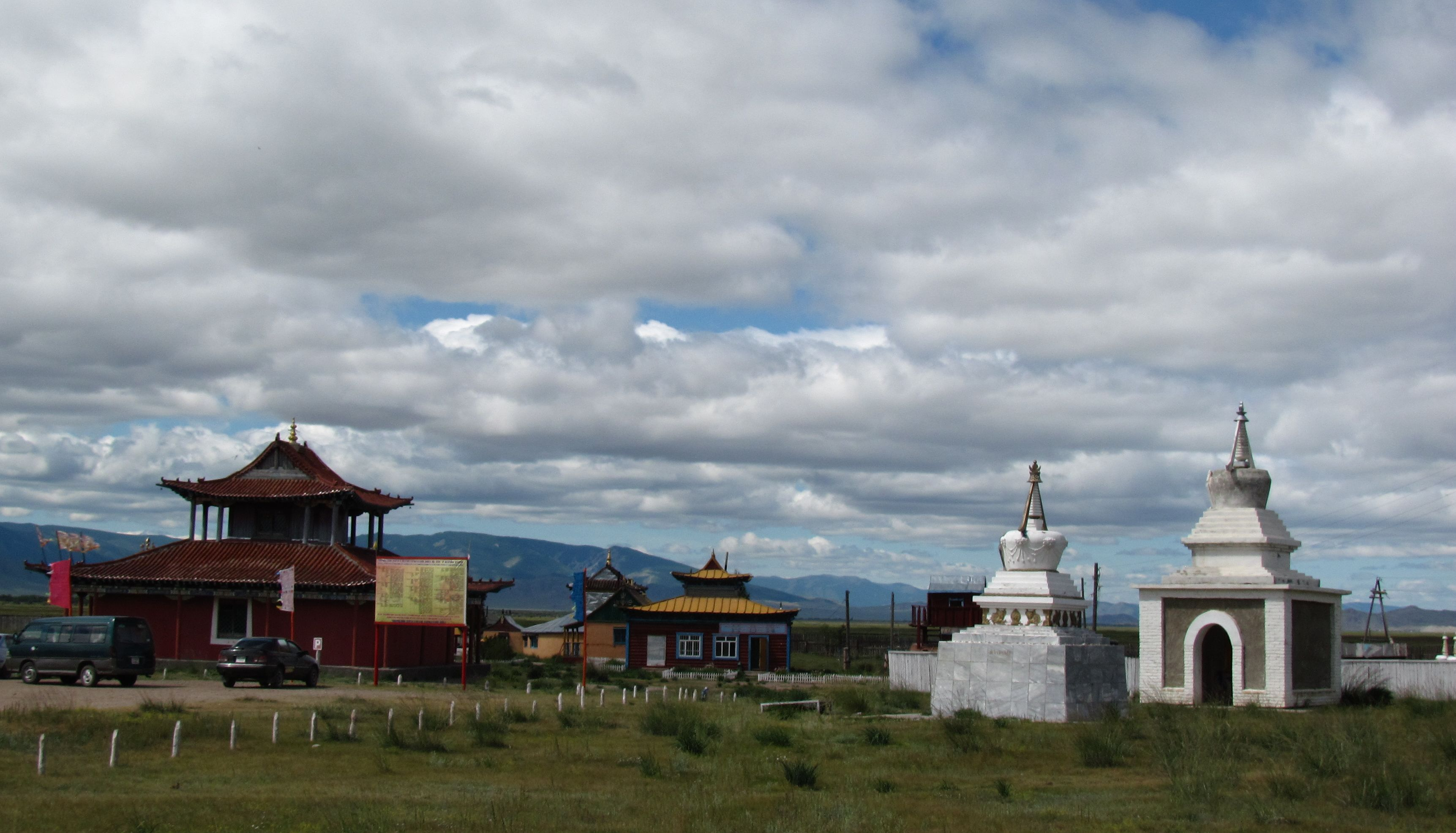
Gandandarjaalin Khiid, general view

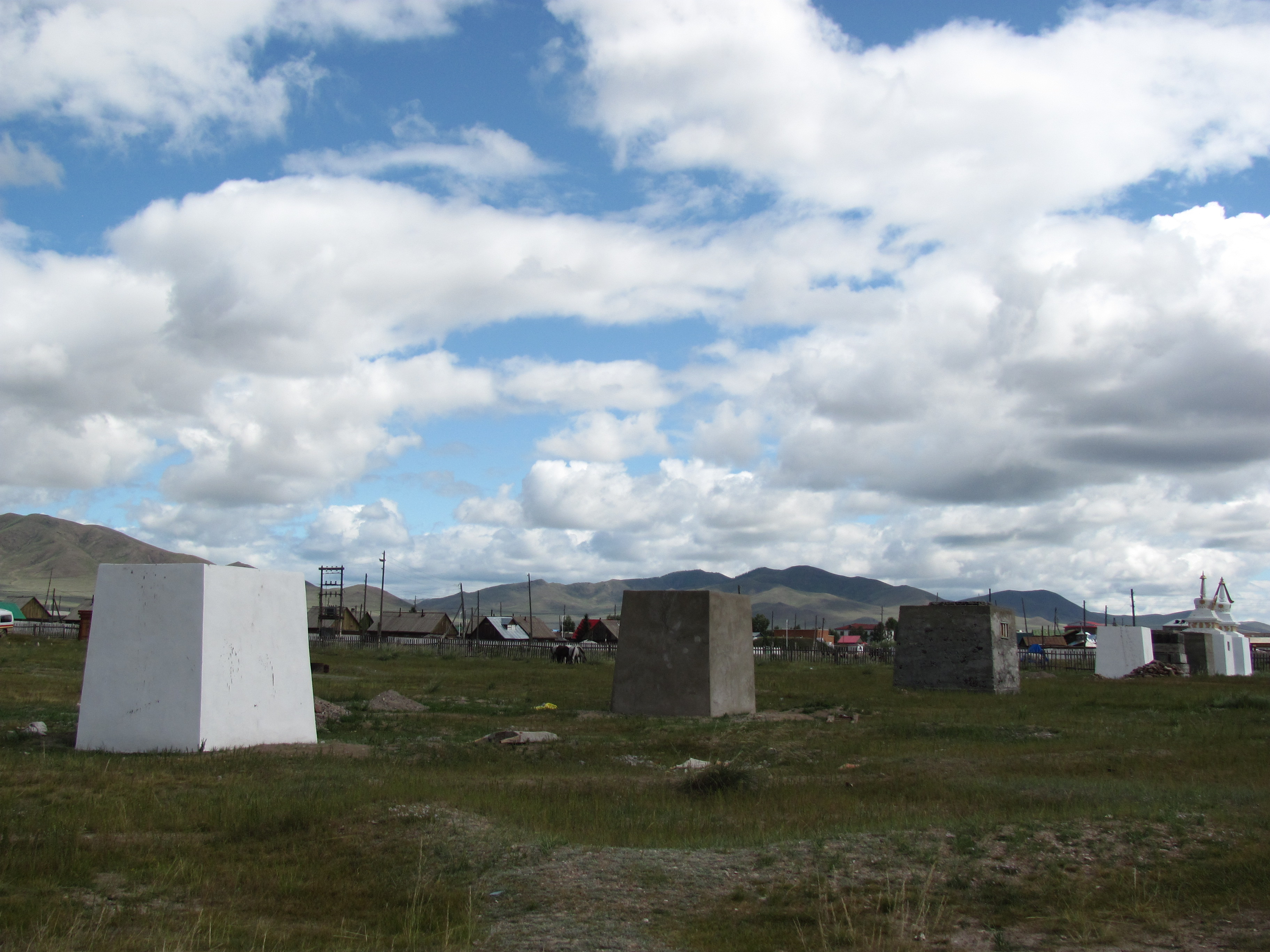
stupas under construction

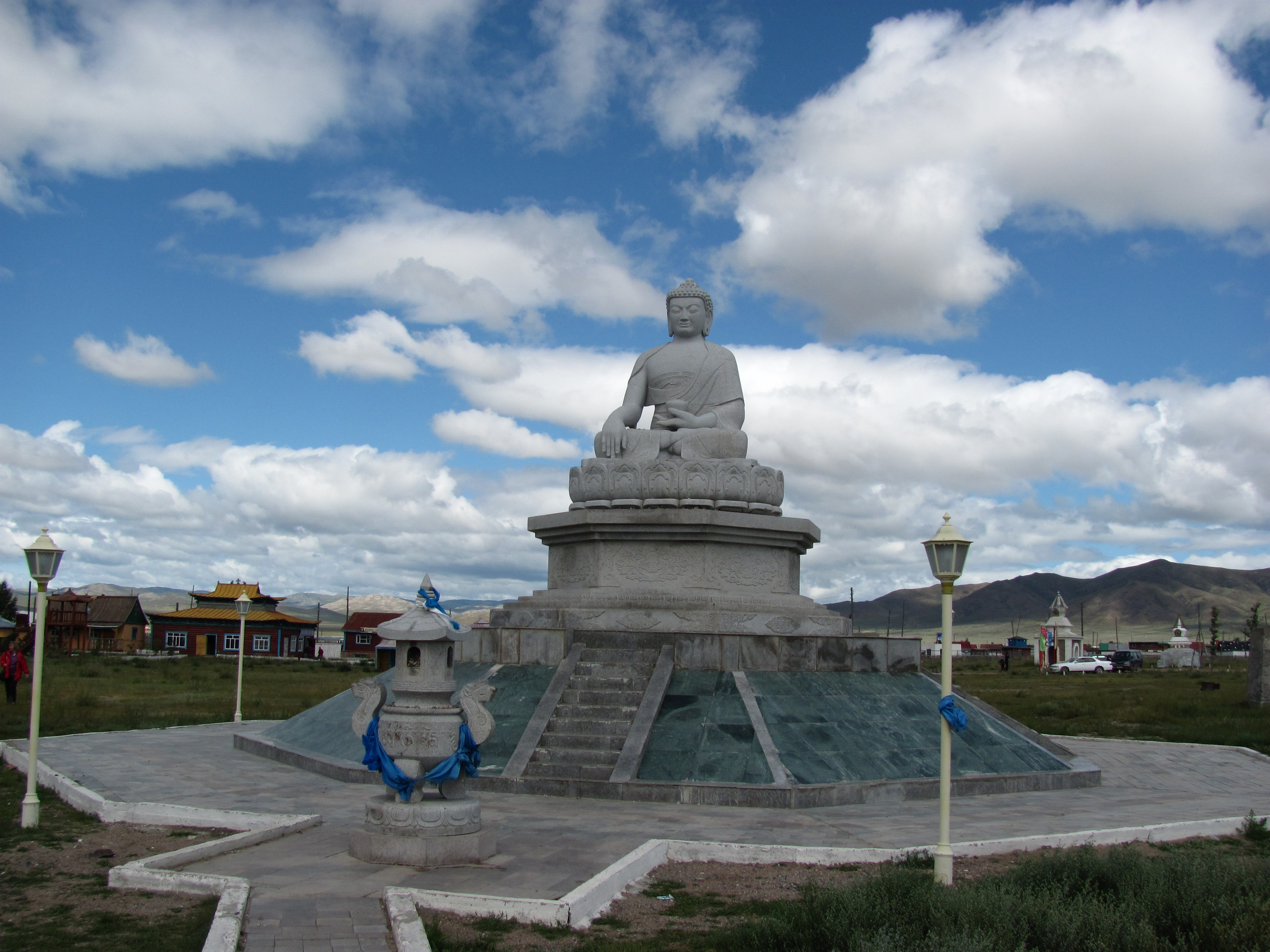
Buddha Statue
