= Peljidiin Genden =

Mongolian politician (1892–1937)

- Пэлжидийн Гэндэн
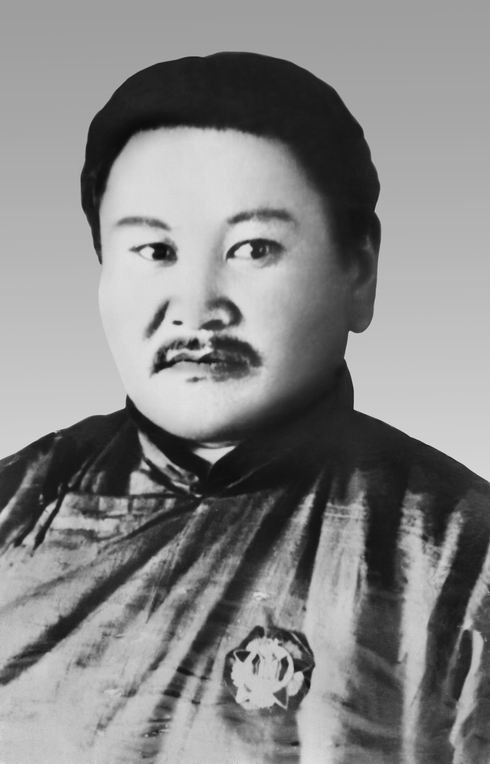

9th Prime Minister of Mongolia
- In office 2 July 1932 – 22 March 1936
- Preceded by: Tsengeltiin Jigjidjav
- Succeeded by: Anandyn Amar

Chairman of the Presidium of the State Little Khural
- In office 29 November 1924 – 15 November 1927
- Party chairman: Tseren-Ochiryn Dambadorj
- Preceded by: Navaandorjiin Jadambaa
- Succeeded by: Jamtsangiin Damdinsüren

Secretary of the Central Committee of the Mongolian People's Revolutionary Party
- In office 11 December 1928 – 30 June 1932 Serving with Ölziitiin Badrakh; Bat-Ochiryn Eldev-Ochir (Note: replaced by Zolbingiin Shijee in March 1930)
- Preceded by: Tseren-Ochiryn Dambadorj
- Succeeded by: Bat-Ochiryn Eldev-Ochir; Jambyn Lkhümbe; Dorjjavyn Luvsansharav

Personal details
- Born: 1895 Sain Noyon Khan, Outer Mongolia, Qing China (present-day Taragt, Övörkhangai)
- Died: 26 November 1937 (aged 41–42) Moscow, Soviet Union
- Cause of death: Execution by firing squad
- Resting place: Donskoye Cemetery
- Party: Mongolian People’s Revolutionary Party (1923–1936)
- Children: G.Tserendulam (daughter)

Peljidiin Genden (Mongolian: Пэлжидийн Гэндэн; 1895 – 26 November 1937) was a Mongolian politician and statesman who served as the first president (as chairman of the presidium) of Mongolia from 1924 to 1927, and the ninth prime minister of the country from 1932 to 1936.

As one of the three MPRP secretaries, Genden was responsible for the swift compulsory implementation of socialist economic policies in the early 1930s. In 1932, he was granted Joseph Stalin's support to become prime minister, but then increasingly resisted pressure from Moscow and the Comintern to liquidate institutional Buddhism and permit increased Soviet influence in Mongolia. His independent temperament, outspokenness (he became famous for fearlessly confronting Stalin during their public meetings in Moscow and was one of the few to stand up to Stalin's strong personality), and growing nationalist sentiments ultimately led to his Soviet-orchestrated purge in March 1936. Accused of conspiring against the revolution and spying for the Japanese, he was executed in Moscow on 26 November 1937.

== Early life and career ==
Genden was born in Sain Noyon Khan aimag in Outer Mongolia (present-day Taragt district of Övörkhangai Province) in July 1895. Peljid is his mother's name and the name Genden was given to him by Peljid's brother, "chorj" lama Namgiljav. In 1922, Genden joined the Mongolian Revolutionary Youth League (MRYL), and a year later he was appointed acting head of his local youth cell. In 1923, he joined the Mongolian People's Revolutionary Party (MPRP). As representative of his local district, he attended the first session of the State Great Khural in the capital Ulaanbaatar in November 1924. There, Prime Minister Balingiin Tserendorj took notice of his outspokenness and based on his recommendation Genden was elected chairman of the Presidium of the State Little Khural, the small assembly that controlled day-to-day matters of state. This made him the effective head of state of Mongolia, a position he would hold from 29 November 1924, to 15 November 1927, and served concurrently as the chairman of the Central Council of Mongolian Trade Unions.

=== Leftist Deviation ===
In late 1928, a decisive struggle between leftist and rightist elements occurred during the 7th Party Congress. The emergence of younger and more radicalized party members led the removal and exile of multiple high-ranking conservative members, including party chair Tseren-Ochiryn Dambadorj. Genden succeeded Dambadorj as one of the three secretaries of the Central Committee of the MPRP from 11 December 1928 to 30 June 1932. Together with fellow secretaries Ölziitiin Badrakh and Bat-Ochiryn Eldev-Ochir (and later Zolbingiin Shijee), Genden urged for swift compulsory implementation of socialist economic policies such as forced collectivization, bans on private enterprise, the closure of monasteries and the forfeiture of their property. The policy proved disastrous as traditional herders were forced off the steppe and into badly managed collective farms, destroying one third of Mongolian livestock. Over 800 properties belonging to Mongolian nobles and Buddhist monasteries were confiscated and the heads of over 700 noble households were executed. As a result, open revolt broke out in several provinces between 1930 and 1932. In response, Moscow ordered the suspension of what it termed the "Leftist Deviation" policies of the Mongolian government and in May 1932 several party leaders (including Badrakh, Shijee, and Prime Minister Tsengeltiin Jigjidjav) were purged for trying to implement socialist measures "prematurely".

== Premiership ==
Genden deftly survived the purge by meeting with Joseph Stalin in 1932 and winning over the Soviet leader. Through Moscow's support, Genden was named Chairman of the Council of People's Commissars (prime minister) on 2 July 1932, replacing the purged Jigjidjav. Genden was placed in charge of the implementation of Mongolia's "New Turn" economic policy (Шинэ эргэлтийн бодлого). The nation's new economic model was considered an easing of more strict communist economic principles. The plan was closely modeled on Vladimir Lenin's 1921 Soviet New Economic Policy. This new policy in Mongolia included a reduction in taxes as well as lessened restrictions on private businesses and religious institutions. Genden's popularity increased as Mongolia's economy was strengthening and shortages were being reduced. For the first time since the revolution the government was in a more dominant position vis-à-vis the MPRP.

=== Lkhümbe Affair ===
In 1933, a personal feud between two party functionaries led to trumped up accusations of widespread conspiring within the party with Japanese spies, especially among Buryats. Several of those arrested and interrogated by Soviet agents in Ulaanbaatar fingered Jambyn Lkhümbe, then secretary of the MPRP Central Committee, as their leader. Genden, party secretary Eldev-Ochir, and Security Directorate Chief D.Namsrai backed the subsequent investigation that saw several hundred people, including Lkhümbe, arrested. 56 were eventually executed (including a pregnant women), 260 were jailed for three to ten years and 126 were sent to the USSR. The vast majority of those persecuted were Buryats. Public opinion at the time held that Genden and D. Namsrai, head of the Internal Affairs Committee, had initiated the affair to purge political enemies, but there is evidence that the affair was driven in large part by Soviet agents looking to weaken the Buryat population in Mongolia.

=== Relations with Stalin ===
Ties between Stalin and Genden began to fray as early as 1934 when, at a meeting with Genden in Moscow, Stalin urged him to destroy Mongolia's Buddhist clergies. He told the Mongolian leader to exterminate more than 100,000 of his nation's lamas, whom Stalin called "the enemies within". Genden, a staunch Buddhist, was once quoted as saying "On earth there are two great geniuses – Buddha and Lenin." In 1933, Genden stated his intention "not to fight against religion" and allowed Mongolian lamas to practice their religion in public, directly challenging Stalin's orders.

Mongolian state and military delegation, headed by Genden, with Vyacheslav Molotov in Moscow, January 1936

Suspicious of growing Soviet domination in Mongolia, Genden actively postponed both a 1934 bilateral gentlemen's agreement, in which the USSR promised to protect Mongolia from potential invasion, as well as the 1936 "Mutual Assistance Pact" that allowed for the stationing of Soviet troops in Mongolia. Genden hoped to stave off Soviet domination by exploiting the diplomatic strain between the USSR and Japan to Mongolia's benefit, but the policy would later prove to be his undoing as accusations surfaced in 1936 that he was working on the side of the Japanese. Genden likewise hesitated on Stalin's recommendations that he elevate Mongolia's internal affairs committee to a fully independent ministry and that he increase the size of Mongolia's military.

In December 1935, Genden traveled again to Moscow, where Stalin dismissed his requests for economic assistance, and again rebuked him for not following instructions. Genden became argumentative after this meeting, and later started a fight with Stalin while heavily intoxicated during a reception at the Mongolian Embassy. Stalin allegedly said "Genden, apparently you want to become Mongolia's king, don't you?" and Genden responded "You bloody Georgian, you have become a virtual Russian Tsar". Genden then slapped Stalin and broke his pipe according to some witnesses. Dorjjavyn Luvsansharav, Genden's political opponent, alleged that Genden "broke tables and chairs" and "even suggested that an alliance with Japan was possible". Genden later attempted to defend himself over the incident in his final public statement:

"Stalin is a powerful man. I also possess power to represent Mongolia. This is why I am entitled to say what I think ... I am being criticized for having gotten drunk and having had a squabble with Stalin. This has nothing to do [with] the Mongolian-Soviet relations. When people get drunk, anything can happen; they become unreasonable. You say that I am uneducated. It is true, I am uneducated. A person like that does not know what he is doing."

=== Purging ===
Upon Genden's return to Mongolia, Khorloogiin Choibalsan, acting under orders from Stalin, organized the second plenary meeting of MPRP in March 1936 in Ulaanbaatar to permanently remove Genden from office. Party members led by Luvsansharav reprimanded Genden for his actions in Moscow and accused him of sabotaging relations with the Soviet Union. He was subsequently removed from his offices of both the prime minister and the foreign minister and then placed under strict house arrest. Anandyn Amar was appointed as the prime minister for the second time in Genden's place. With the purge of Genden, Choibalsan became Stalin's favored official in Ulaanbaatar and was named head of the new Internal Affairs Ministry, effectively making him the most powerful person in Mongolia.

== Death ==
Memorial at the Kommunarka shooting ground, commemorating Genden and 248 other executed Mongolians abroad

Genden was "invited" to the USSR, ostensibly for medical care, in April 1936. He then spent one year at the resort town of Foros on the Black Sea. On 17 July 1937, he was arrested in Sochi by Mongolian security officials during the unravelling of the Great Purge in the Soviet Union and under interrogation admitted to plotting with "lamaist reactionaries" and "Japanese spies."

Despite being told he would be flown back to Mongolia, Genden was taken to Moscow and sentenced to death by order from the Military Collegium of the Supreme Court of the USSR. Within the same day, he was executed in Moscow on 26 November 1937, for "his attempt to undertake a political coup and being a spy of Japan."

== Rehabilitation ==
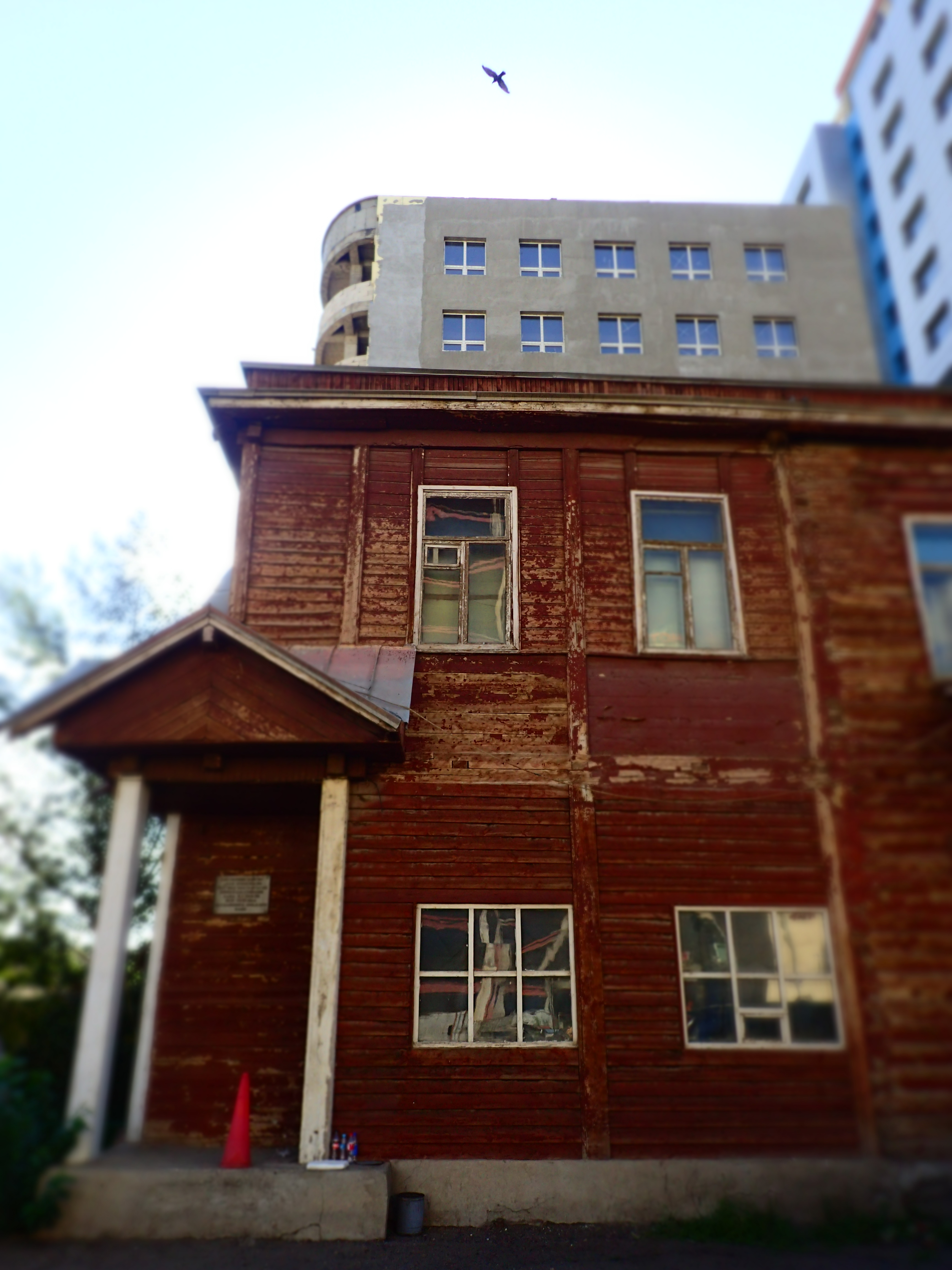
Genden's former residence in 2017

Genden was declared a nonperson in Mongolia; however, he would be rehabilitated on 15 December 1956 by the Military Collegium of the Supreme Court of the Soviet Union, nearly two decades after his death. Following the Soviet rehabilitation, Genden was rehabilitated in Mongolia by a commission under the Presidium of the People's Great Khural on 13 February 1962. Much of his actions and history still remained obscured in Mongolia up until the country's democratic revolution in 1990.

Genden's only daughter Tserendulam, born in 1927/1928, personally wrote a letter to then leader of the USSR, Mikhail Gorbachev, in 1985. Consequently, documentation of Genden's rehabilitation was received by her later in 1989, two years after it arrived in Mongolia.

On 10 September 1996, Tserendulam opened the Memorial Museum for Victims of Political Repression in his former residence, coinciding with the inaugural Day of Tribute to Victims of Political Repression (commemorated annually since 1996). In 2019, the 90-year-old structure was demolished for redevelopment and renovation. The museum, to be opened at the ground floor of the new 22-story building, is currently directed by Sodnomyn Bekhbat, the grandson of Genden.

== Notes ==
Party political offices
Preceded by Tseren-Ochiryn Dambadorj	Secretary of the Mongolian People's Revolutionary Party; 11 December 1928 – 30 June 1932; Served alongside: Ölziitiin Badrakh; Bat-Ochiryn Eldev-Ochir; Zolbingiin Shijee	Succeeded by Bat-Ochiryn Eldev-Ochir; Jambyn Lkhümbe; Dorjjavyn Luvsansharav
Political offices
Preceded by Navaandorjiin Jadambaa	Chairman of the Presidium of the State Little Khural; 29 November 1924 – 15 November 1927	Succeeded by Jamtsangiin Damdinsüren
Preceded by Tsengeltiin Jigjidjav	Prime Minister of Mongolia; 2 July 1932 – 2 March 1936	Succeeded by Anandyn Amar
