= Losolyn Laagan =

Mongolian politician

- Лосолын Лааган
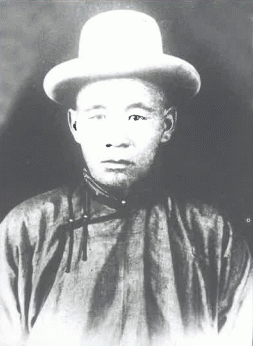

5th Chairman of the Presidium of the People's Great Khural
- In office April 27, 1930 – June 2, 1932
- Preceded by: Khorloogiin Choibalsan
- Succeeded by: Anandyn Amar

Personal details
- Born: 1887 Buyant Sum, Khovd Province, Outer Mongolia, Qing China
- Died: May 4, 1940 (aged 52–53)
- Party: Mongolian People’s Revolutionary Party (1923–1932)

Losolyn Laagan (Mongolian: Лосолын Лааган; 1887 - May 4, 1940) was a Mongolian politician and member of the Mongolian People's Revolutionary Party (MPRP) who served as chairman of the Presidium of the State Little Khural (titular Head of state of Mongolia) from April 27, 1930, to June 2, 1932.

== Biography ==
Lagaan was born in 1887 in Buyant Sum, Khovd Province. He joined the MPRP in 1923 and two years later was appointed chairman of the Auditing Committee of the Committee of the MPRP for Khovd Province. In 1928 he was named chairman of the Central Auditing Commission of the national MPRP. In March 1930 he was elected a member of the Central Committee of the MPRP Presidium and on April 27, 1930, was named Chairman of the Presidium of the Little Khural, or titular Head of State of the Mongolian People's Republic, a position he would hold until June 2, 1932.

In spring 1932, Laagan was one of several political leaders blamed for excesses of what was later termed the "Leftist Deviation," during which the government actively pursued Soviet tailored policies to force herders onto collective farms, suppress private trade, and seize property of both the nobility and the Buddhist church. The harsh policies resulted in violent uprisings that spread across western Mongolia. Lagaan and several other leading politicians were officially expelled from the party in May 1932 and Laagan was removed from his position as Chairman of the Presidium of the State Little Hural a month later and demoted to a minor civil service position in his native Khovd Province.

Laagan was one of the earliest government officials arrested during Khorloogiin Choibalsan's Great Terror (1937-1939). He was arrested in September 1937 on charges of counterrevolutionary activities. Sentenced to death on May 4, 1940, he was executed on the same day.

Losolyn Laagan was rehabilitated in 1962.

Political offices
Preceded by Khorloogiin Choibalsan	Head of state of Mongolia; April 27, 1930 – June 2, 1932	Succeeded by Anandyn Amar
