= Zolbingiin Shijee =

Mongolian revolutionary (1901–1941)

- Золбингийн Шижээ
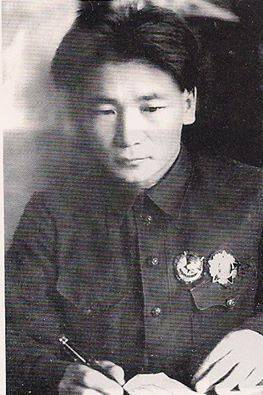

Secretary of the Central Committee of the Mongolian People's Revolutionary Party
- In office 13 March 1930 – 30 June 1932 Serving with Ölziitiin Badrakh; Peljidiin Genden
- Preceded by: Bat-Ochiryn Eldev-Ochir
- Succeeded by: Bat-Ochiryn Eldev-Ochir; Jambyn Lkhümbe; Dorjjavyn Luvsansharav

Personal details
- Born: 1901 Bortala, Xinjiang, Qing China
- Died: 27 July 1941 (aged 39–40) Moscow, Russian SFSR, Soviet Union
- Cause of death: Execution by shooting
- Party: Mongolian People’s Revolutionary Party (1923–1932)

Zolbingiin Shijee (Mongolian: Золбингийн Шижээ; 1901 – 27 July 1941) was a Mongolian revolutionary and politician who served as secretary of the Mongolian People's Revolutionary Party (MPRP) from 1930 to 1932. Considered one of the more extreme leftists of the MPRP, he was expelled from the party in 1932 for his role in the "Leftist Deviation" and exiled to the Soviet Union where he was arrested and shot for counterrevolution in 1941.

== Biography ==
Shijee was born in present-day Bortala, Xinjiang in 1901. He was a partisan fighter in the People's Revolution of 1921 and then became a prison director. In 1923, he joined the MPRP working for the party's Central Committee. Shijee was one of several younger, more radicalized party members from rural areas (others included Tsengeltiin Jigjidjav, Ölziitiin Badrakh, Bat-Ochiryn Eldev-Ochir, Jambyn Lkhümbe, and Peljidiin Genden) recruited by the Soviets to challenge the authority of the MPRP "old guard". Soviets enrolled him in the Communist University of the Toilers of the East in Moscow and then sent him to agitate Uyghur Hui students and organize supplies of arms and revolutionaries to the Xinjiang region as part of Soviet plans to establish a puppet government there. It was during this period that Shijee first met Badrakh and the two discussed the possibility of creating an autonomous republic of non-Khalkh Mongol regions of Dörvöd (present-day Uvs Province), Tannu Uriankhai, and Xinjiang.

Shijee returned to Mongolia in 1928 and rose within the government through a rapid series of promotions: he was first elected secretary of the Central Council of the Mongolian Trade Unions, then appointed head of Internal Security Directorate from 1928 to 1929, and then made chairman of the board of the State Bank from 1929 to 1930. He was one of several "new leftists" promoted into party leadership positions during the Eighth Party Congress in 1930, when he was elected member of presidium (or politburo) of the MPRP and one of three secretaries of the party Central Committee (a position he would hold until 30 June 1932), succeeding previous secretary Bat-Ochiryn Eldev-Ochir.

Recognized as one of the party's most extreme leftists, Shijee actively pushed Soviet tailored policies that aggressively forced herders onto collective farms, suppressed private trade, and seized property of both the nobility and the Buddhist church. As a result, one third of Mongolian livestock was decimated, over 800 properties belonging to the nobility and the Buddhist clergy were confiscated, and approximately 700 heads of mostly noble households were executed. When violent uprisings spread across western Mongolia in 1932 in reaction to the harsh policies, Moscow ordered a curtailment of the unpopular initiatives and pinned the blame for the excesses of what became known as the "Leftist Deviation" on Shijee and other hard-line leftists within the party leadership, including Ölziitiin Badrakh, and premier Tsengeltiin Jigjidjav. All were officially expelled from the party in May 1932.

== Death ==
Shijee was exiled to Moscow where in 1937 he was arrested on charges of counterrevolution. Shijee's father, a simple herder in Mongolia, was also arrested. Shijee was sentenced to death by military collegium of the USSR Supreme Court on 9 July 1941, and shot 27 July 1941.

He was rehabilitated in 1963.

== Notes ==
Party political offices
Preceded by Bat-Ochiryn Eldev-Ochir	Secretary of the Mongolian People's Revolutionary Party; 13 March 1930 - 30 June 1932; Served alongside: Ölziitiin Badrakh; Peljidiin Genden	Succeeded by Bat-Ochiryn Eldev-Ochir; Jambyn Lkhümbe; Dorjjavyn Luvsansharav
