= Mogod =

District in Bulgan Province, Mongolia

Coordinates: 48°16′39″N 102°59′07″E

Mogod District Могод сум ᠮᠣᠭᠤᠳᠤᠰᠤᠮᠤ
- District
- Interactive map of Mogod District
- Country: Mongolia
- Province: Bulgan Province
- Time zone: UTC+8 (UTC + 8)

Mogod (Mongolian: Могод) is a sum (district) of Bulgan Province in northern Mongolia. In 2009, its population was 2,738.

== Administrative divisions ==
The district is divided into five bags, which are:

- Bayan-Uul
- Bayangol
- Bayasgalant
- Erkht
- Jargalant
