= Memorial Museum of Victims of Political Repression =

Defunct museum in Ulaanbaatar, Mongolia

- Улс төрийн хилс хэрэгт хэлмэгдэгсдийн дурсгалын музей
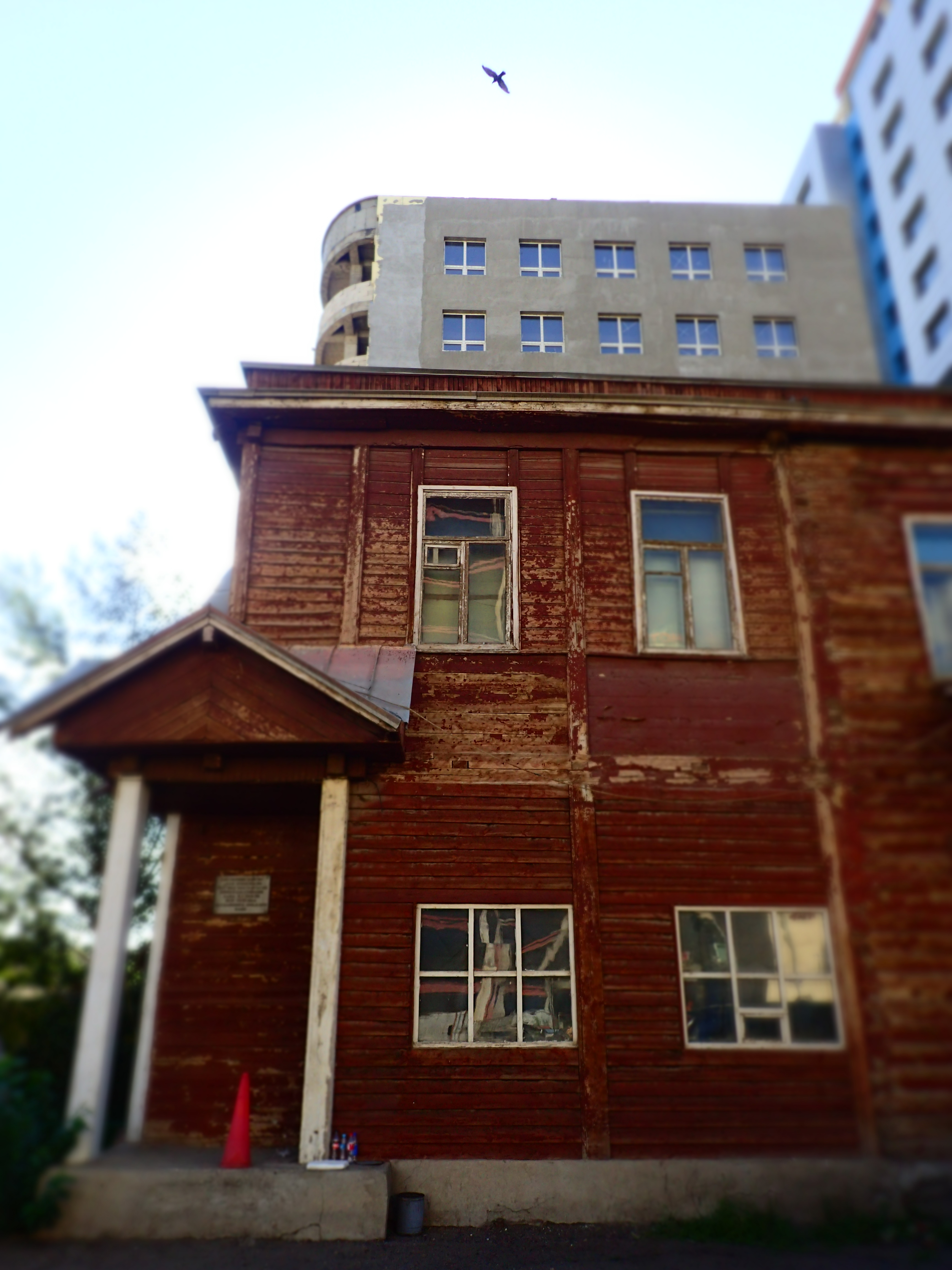
- Building before demolition July 2017
- Established: 1996 (building erected 1928)
- Dissolved: 2019
- Location: Ulaanbaatar, Mongolia
- Coordinates: 47.9151727°N 106.9205157°E
- Type: History museum

The Memorial Museum of Victims of Political Repression (Mongolian: Улс төрийн хилс хэрэгт хэлмэгдэгсдийн дурсгалын музей) was a museum in Ulaanbaatar dedicated to the victims of political repressions in Mongolia from 1922 to 1962. The museum was housed in the former residence of Mongolian prime minister Peljidiin Genden, a wooden structure built in 1928 by a German engineer named Goring. The museum was opened on 10 September 1996 by the initiative of Gendengiin Tserendulam, daughter of the former prime minister.

The museum was demolished in 2019 and a 22-storey office block was erected in its place.

== See also ==
- Museum of Victims of Political Repression in Tashkent, Uzbekistan
- Museum of Political Repression Victims, Azerbaijan
