= Chairman of the Mongolian People's Party =

Head of the Mongolian People's Party

- Монгол Ардын Намын дарга
- Logo of the Mongolian People's Party

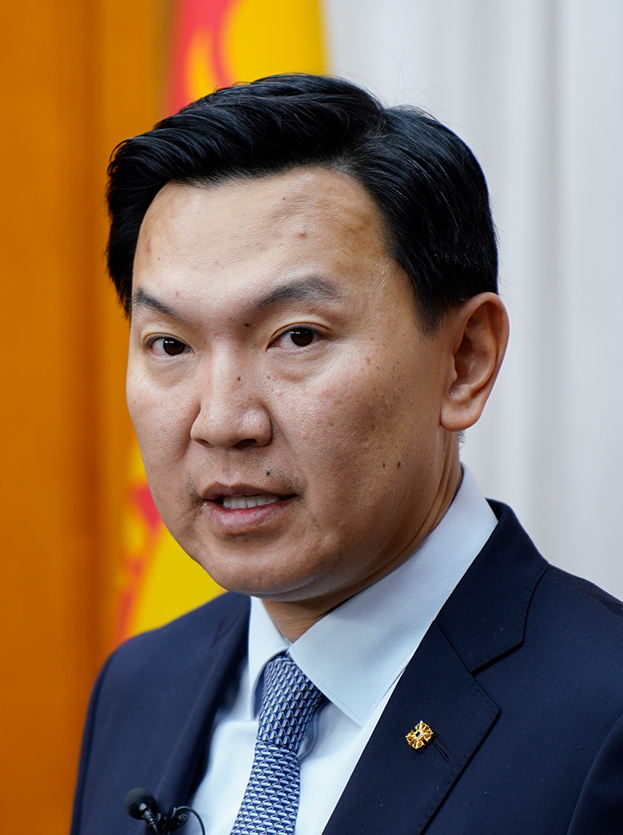
- Incumbent; Nyam-Osoryn Uchral since 15 November 2025
- Mongolian People's Party
- Type: Party leader
- Seat: Ulaanbaatar
- Inaugural holder: Soliin Danzan
- Formation: 3 March 1921

The Chairman of the Mongolian People's Party (Mongolian: Монгол Ардын Намын дарга) is the leader of the Mongolian People's Party (formerly the Mongolian People's Revolutionary Party), established on 3 March 1921. With some exceptions, the position was synonymous with that of the leader of the Mongolian People's Republic, the one-party socialist state that existed from 1924 to 1992. The current chairperson is Nyam-Osoryn Uchral, who was elected to the position by the 31st Party Congress in November 2025.

Throughout time, the position has had several names:

- Chairman of the Central Committee (1921–1928; 1990–1992)
- General Secretary of the Central Committee (1940–1954; 1981–1990)
- First Secretary of the Central Committee (1954–1981)
- Secretary General of the Party Leadership Council (1992–1997)

Between 11 December 1928 and 8 April 1940 (the 7th to 10th Congresses), the leadership was collective and comprised three Secretaries of the Central Committee.

== List ==
No.	Portrait	Name (Birth–Death)	Term of office					
No.	Portrait	Name (Birth–Death)	Took office		Left office		Time in office	
Chairman of the Central Committee 1921–1928
1		Soliin Danzan (1884–1924)	3 March 1921		September 1921		5 months	
–		Dogsomyn Bodoo (1885–1922)	September 1921		7 January 1922		4 months	
2		Tseren-Ochiryn Dambadorj (1899–1934)	15 March 1922		2 January 1923		293 days	
3		Ajvaagiin Danzan (1895–1932)	2 January 1923		31 August 1924		1 year, 242 days	
4		Tseren-Ochiryn Dambadorj (1899–1934)	31 August 1924		October 1928		4 years, 1 month	
Secretary of the Central Committee 1928–1940
5	Ölziitiin Badrakh (1895–1941)	11 December 1928 ↓ 30 June 1932	6	Bat-Ochiryn Eldev-Ochir (1905–1937)	11 December 1928 ↓ 13 March 1930	7	Peljidiin Genden (1895–1937)	11 December 1928 ↓ 30 June 1932
5	Ölziitiin Badrakh (1895–1941)	11 December 1928 ↓ 30 June 1932	8	Zolbingiin Shijee (1901–1941)	13 March 1930 ↓ 30 June 1932	7	Peljidiin Genden (1895–1937)	11 December 1928 ↓ 30 June 1932
9	Jambyn Lkhümbe (1902–1934)	30 June 1932 ↓ July 1933	10	Bat-Ochiryn Eldev-Ochir (1905–1937)	30 June 1932 ↓ 12 December 1937 †	11	Dorjjavyn Luvsansharav (1900–1941)	30 June 1932 ↓ c. 9 July 1939
12	Khas-Ochiryn Luvsandorj (1910–1937)	5 October 1934 ↓ 15 August 1936	10	Bat-Ochiryn Eldev-Ochir (1905–1937)	30 June 1932 ↓ 12 December 1937 †	11	Dorjjavyn Luvsansharav (1900–1941)	30 June 1932 ↓ c. 9 July 1939
13	Banzarjavyn Baasanjav (1906–1940)	7 October 1936 ↓ 22 February 1940	10	Bat-Ochiryn Eldev-Ochir (1905–1937)	30 June 1932 ↓ 12 December 1937 †	11	Dorjjavyn Luvsansharav (1900–1941)	30 June 1932 ↓ c. 9 July 1939
13	Banzarjavyn Baasanjav (1906–1940)	7 October 1936 ↓ 22 February 1940	14	Dashiin Damba (1908–1989)	4 July 1939 ↓ 8 April 1940	–		
–			14	Dashiin Damba (1908–1989)	4 July 1939 ↓ 8 April 1940	–		
General Secretary of the Central Committee 1940–1954
15		Yumjaagiin Tsedenbal (1916–1991)	8 April 1940		4 April 1954		13 years, 361 days	
First Secretary of the Central Committee 1954–1981
16		Dashiin Damba (1908–1989)	4 April 1954		22 November 1958		4 years, 232 days	
17		Yumjaagiin Tsedenbal (1916–1991)	22 November 1958		30 May 1981		22 years, 189 days	
General Secretary of the Central Committee 1981–1990
(17)		Yumjaagiin Tsedenbal (1916–1991)	30 May 1981		23 August 1984		3 years, 85 days	
18		Jambyn Batmönkh (1926–1997)	23 August 1984		14 March 1990		5 years, 203 days	
19		Gombojavyn Ochirbat (born 1929)	14 March 1990		13 April 1990		30 days	
Chairman of the Central Committee 1990–1992
(19)		Gombojavyn Ochirbat (born 1929)	13 April 1990		28 February 1991		321 days	
20		Büdragchaagiin Dash-Yondon (born 1946)	28 February 1991		5 October 1992		1 year, 220 days	
Secretary General of the Party Leadership Council 1992–1997
(20)		Büdragchaagiin Dash-Yondon (born 1946)	5 October 1992		28 July 1996		3 years, 297 days	
21		Nambaryn Enkhbayar (born 1958)	28 July 1996		25 February 1997		212 days	
Chairman 1997–present
22		Natsagiin Bagabandi (born 1950)	25 February 1997		19 June 1997		114 days	
23		Nambaryn Enkhbayar (born 1958)	19 June 1997		19 June 2005		8 years	
24		Miyeegombyn Enkhbold (born 1964)	19 June 2005		26 October 2007		2 years, 129 days	
25		Sanjiin Bayar (born 1956)	26 October 2007		8 April 2010		2 years, 164 days	
26		Sükhbaataryn Batbold (born 1963)	8 April 2010		24 July 2012		2 years, 107 days	
27		Ölziisaikhany Enkhtüvshin (born 1958)	24 July 2012		29 October 2013		1 year, 97 days	
28		Miyeegombyn Enkhbold (born 1964)	29 October 2013		21 November 2017		4 years, 23 days	
29		Ukhnaagiin Khürelsükh (born 1968)	21 November 2017		25 June 2021		3 years, 216 days	
30		Luvsannamsrain Oyun-Erdene (born 1980)	25 June 2021		28 September 2025		4 years, 95 days	
31		Dashzegviin Amarbayasgalan (born 1981)	28 September 2025 (Note: Amarbayasgalan was elected the party chairman with over 90% support but wasn't officially registered by the Supreme Court of Mongolia. Legally Oyun-Erdene remained as chairman until 15 November 2025.)		15 November 2025		48 days	
32		Nyam-Osoryn Uchral (born 1987)	15 November 2025		Incumbent		1 year, 7 days	
