= Tseren-Ochiryn Dambadorj =

Mongolian politician (1898–1934)

- Цэрэн-Очирын Дамбадорж
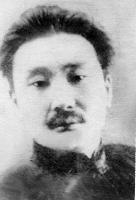

Chairman of the Mongolian People's Revolutionary Party
- In office 31 August 1924 – 27 October 1928
- Preceded by: Ajvaagiin Danzan
- Succeeded by: Ölziitiin Badrakh; Bat-Ochiryn Eldev-Ochir; Peljidiin Genden
- In office 15 March 1922 – 12 January 1923
- Preceded by: Soliin Danzan
- Succeeded by: Ajvaagiin Danzan

Personal details
- Born: 1899 Niislel Khüree, Mongolia, Qing China
- Died: 25 June 1934 (aged 34–35) Moscow, Soviet Union
- Party: Mongolian People's Revolutionary Party (1921–1928)

Tseren-Ochiryn Dambadorj (Mongolian: Цэрэн-Очирын Дамбадорж; 1899 – 25 June 1934) was a Mongolian revolutionary and politician who served as Chairman of the Mongolian People's Revolutionary Party from 1922 to 1928. He was expelled from the party in 1928 for his rightist policies and exiled to Moscow. He spent his remaining years in Moscow until his death in 1934.

== Early life and career ==
Dambadorj was born in Niislel Khüree in 1899. From the age of six, he was a student at a local datsan in Elbeg-Amgalant. Dambadorj attended Manchu and Russian Interpreter's School in the capital from 1910 to 1912, before moving onto the Russian gymnasium 1913 to 1914 and then secondary school in Troitskosavsk from 1917 to 1918. From 1918 to 1920, he worked as a signalman at the Telecommunication Department of Niislel Khüree and the Telecommunication Committee of Kyakhta.

=== Revolutionary activities ===
In the fall of 1920, he joined the Mongolian People's Party (MPP) and was elected a member of the Central Committee following the MPP's first meeting in early March 1921. Dambadorj served in the People's Provisional Government as an officer in the Foreign Affairs Department of the Ministry of Interior.

During the unravelling of the People's Revolution, as a partisan, he was appointed the provisional government's representative to the Western Region, where he established the government branch and party committee with the support from local authorities. Alongwith commander Khasbaatar and Karl Karlovich Baikalov, Dambadorj participated in leading the recruitment and struggle against White Russian forces in the region.

After the revolution, he was elected vice chairman from January to March 1922 and then chairman of the Central Committee from 15 March 1922 to 12 January 1923. As chairman, he was succeeded by Ajvaagiin Danzan in January 1923.

== Rise within the party ==
At the Third Party Congress in 1924, Dambadorj along with leftist leader Rinchingiin Elbegdorj, led calls for the arrest and execution of moderate party leader Soliin Danzan, accusing him of representing bourgeois interests and engaging in business with Chinese firms. Following Danzan's death, Dambadorj and the party's right wing assumed significant control of the party with his ascension as chairman on 31 August 1924. The party was renamed the Mongolian People's Revolutionary Party (MPRP) following the party congress. During Dambadorj's chairmanship, the party promoted rightist policies mirroring Lenin's New Economic Policy in the Soviet Union.

According to the political analyst and writer Bat-Erdene Batbayar, Dambadorj established diplomatic contacts with Japan and China, whereas his colleague Navaandorjiin Jadambaa kept in touch with the United States, the United Kingdom, and Germany. They hoped to establish Mongolia as a neutral and diplomatically recognized state, but came under attack within their own party ranks because of their perceived rapprochement with the capitalist powers.

In 1925, Dambadorj undertook a mission to Europe ostensibly to promote the activities of the Institute of Science and Letters alongside efforts to establish contacts with French and German governments. The government Mongolian People's Republic, established in 1924, ratified a decision to send 35 Mongolian students to the West on 27 November 1925. The efforts by Dambadorj, Jamsrangiin Tseveen, Khatanbaatar Magsarjav, and Erdene Batkhaan within the party to expand international recognition of Mongolia's independence only served to enrage the Soviets who grew increasingly suspicious of the party leader's allegiances.

Dambadorj confirmed these suspicions by making statements such as "the elimination of capital and the confiscation of capital of the old feudal nobility...are incompatible with the government's policies." He often expressed concern about creeping Soviet imperialism even while opponents such as Khorloogiin Choibalsan praised the Soviet Union as Mongolia's closest friend." The growing policy differences and ideological struggle between the rightists and leftists continued onwards in the Fourth, the Fifth, and the Sixth Party Congresses between 1925 and 1927.

== Party expulsion and later years ==
The Soviets finally moved to purge Dambadorj and other rightwingers at the Seventh Party Congress in 1928. The rise of Josef Stalin in the Soviet Union ushered in a "Leftist Period" in the Mongolian People's Republic wherein the party pushed more rapid collectivization, land expropriation, and persecution of the Buddhist clergy. "Rightwingers" such as Dambadorj, Ajvaagiin Danzan, Tseveen Jamsrano, and Navaandorjiin Jadambaa, all of whom had played a role in what was later called "Right Opportunism", were expelled from the party in 1928. Following Dambadorj's removal, party leftists, Ölziitiin Badrakh, Bat-Ochiryn Eldev-Ochir, and Peljidiin Genden, were chosen as the three secretaries of the Central Committee.

Dambadorj was exiled and sent to Moscow as a trade representative attached to the Mongolian Embassy there. He died on 25 June 1934, in what some suspect was a result of poisoning.
