= Ölziitiin Badrakh =

Mongolian politician (1895–1941)

- Өлзийтийн Бадрах
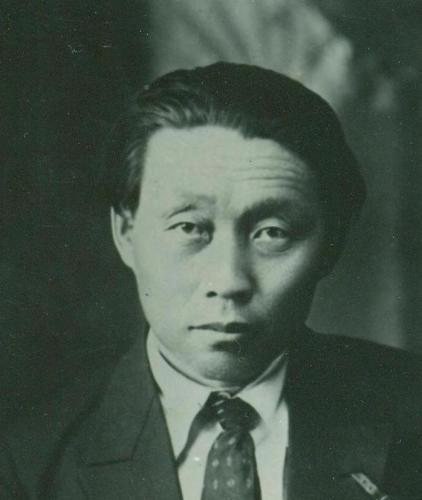

Secretary of the Central Committee of the Mongolian People's Revolutionary Party
- In office 11 December 1928 – 30 June 1932 Serving with Peljidiin Genden; Bat-Ochiryn Eldev-Ochir (Note: replaced by Zolbingiin Shijee in 1930)
- Preceded by: Tseren-Ochiryn Dambadorj
- Succeeded by: Bat-Ochiryn Eldev-Ochir; Jambyn Lkhümbe; Dorjjavyn Luvsansharav

Minister of Health
- In office 1932–1934
- Premier: Peljidiin Genden
- Preceded by: Dolgoryn Puntsag
- Succeeded by: Navaantserengiin Gonjoon

Minister of Finance
- In office 1924–1925
- Premier: Balingiin Tserendorj
- Preceded by: Bunibazaryn Dorj
- Succeeded by: Jigmediin Altangerel

Personal details
- Born: 1895 Outer Mongolia, Qing China (present-day Davst, Uvs)
- Died: 30 July 1941 (aged 45–46) Kommunarka shooting ground, Moscow Oblast, Soviet Union
- Party: Mongolian People's Revolutionary Party

Ölziitiin Badrakh (Mongolian: Өлзийтийн Бадрах; 1895 – 30 July 1941) was a Mongolian politician who served as secretary of the Mongolian People's Revolutionary Party from 1928 to 1932. Blamed for the excesses of the "Leftist Deviation", he was expelled from the MPRP Central Committee in 1932. Later, he was arrested in 1937, accused of conspiring to create a separatist Dörvöd region. He was tried and executed in Moscow on 30 July 1941.

== Biography ==
Badrakh was born in present-day Davst district, Uvs Province in 1895. He served as Minister of Finance from 1924 to 1925. Known as one of the "rurals", he was one of several younger, more radicalized party members from rural areas (others included Jambyn Lkhümbe, Tsengeltiin Jigjidjav, Zolbingiin Shijee, Bat-Ochiryn Eldev-Ochir, and Peljidiin Genden) recruited by the Soviets in the late 1920s to challenge the MRPR "old guard" of Balingiin Tserendorj, Tseren-Ochiryn Dambadorj, and Anandyn Amar.

He was elected member of the MPRP Presidium (Politburo) from 1925 to 1932. At the Seventh MPRP Congress in October 1928, Badrakh was elected one of three secretaries of the MPRP Central Committee (a position he held until 30 June 1932) after the rightists under Tseren-Ochiryn Dambadorj were defeated.

He was expelled from Central Committee in 1932 for his role in the "Leftist Deviation" in which certain party leaders were blamed for overzealously and prematurely attempting to implement socialist policies of forced collectivization and property confiscation and was named minister of health from 1932 to 1934.

== Death ==
In 1937, he was arrested on charges of counterrevolution, accused of heading the "Badrakh Group" along with Zolbingiin Shijee that sought to create a breakaway autonomous Dörvöd region in present-day Uvs Province. He was sent to Moscow, sentenced to death by the Military Collegium of the Supreme Court of the Soviet Union on 7 July 1941, and executed on 30 July 1941.

He was rehabilitated in 1963.

== Notes ==
Party political offices
Preceded by Tseren-Ochiryn Dambadorj (as Chairman)	Secretary of the Mongolian People's Revolutionary Party; 11 December 1928 – 30 June 1932; Served alongside: Peljidiin Genden (1928–32); Bat-Ochiryn Eldev-Ochir (1928–30); Zolbingiin Shijee (1930–32)	Succeeded by Bat-Ochiryn Eldev-Ochir; Jambyn Lkhümbe; Dorjjavyn Luvsansharav
