= Stalinist repressions in Mongolia =

1937–1939 purges in Mongolia

Great Repression
- Part of the Great Purge
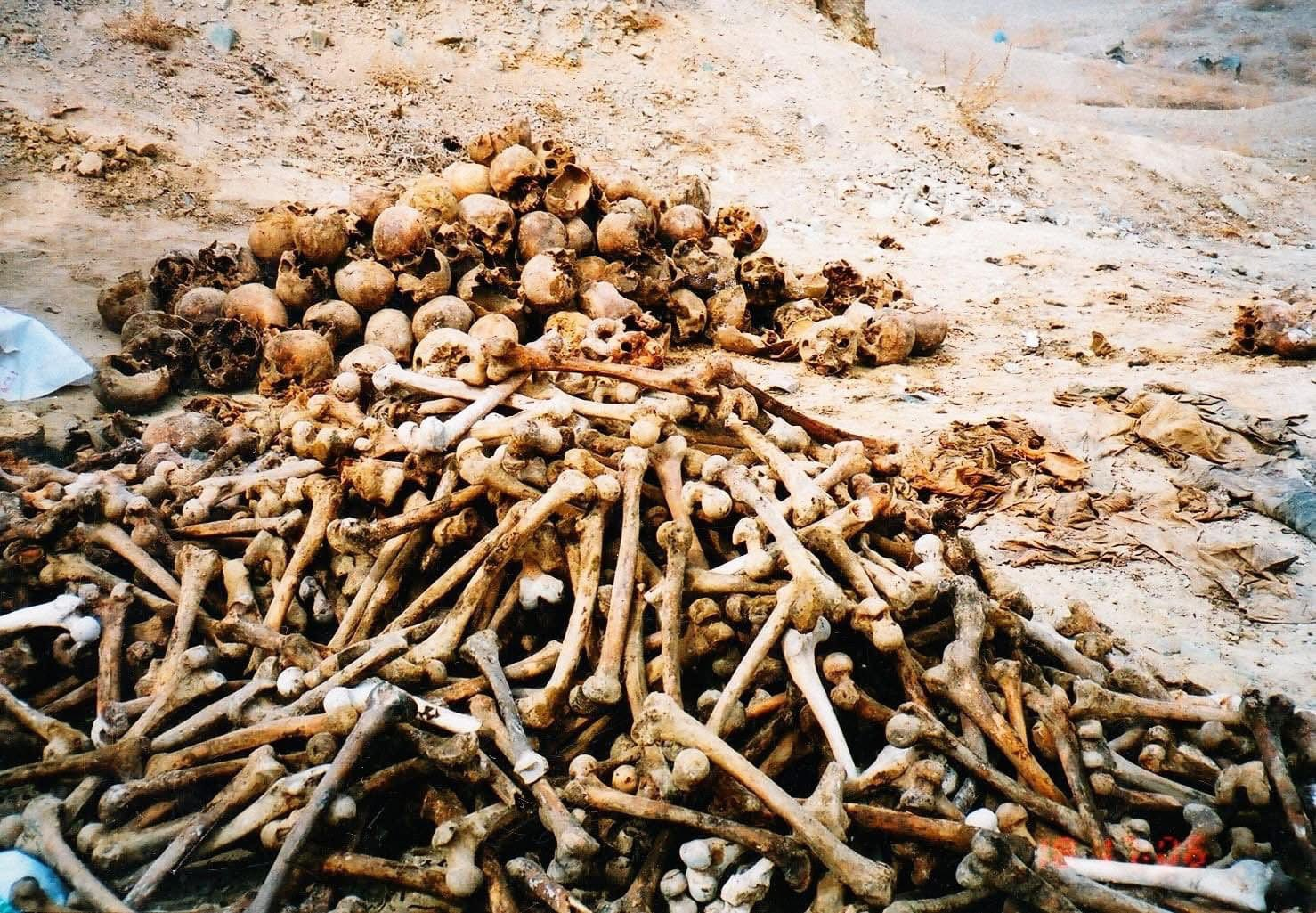
- Remains of victims found in April 2003
- Location: Mongolian People's Republic
- Date: Main phase: September 1937 – April 1939 (1 year, 6 months)
- Target: Buddhist clergy, aristocrats; Intelligentsia; Political dissidents; Ethnic Buryats and Kazakhs
- Attack type: Summary executions, massacres, mass murder, ethnic cleansing
- Deaths: 20,000–35,000
- Perpetrators: Khorloogiin Choibalsan; NKVD Deputy Mikhail Frinovsky; Extraordinary Purge Commission; Dorjjavyn Luvsansharav; Minister of Justice G.Tserendorj; Head of the Internal Affairs Committee D. Namsrai; Deputy Minister of Internal Affairs Nasantogtokh, Bayasgalan, Dashtseveg, and others
- Motive: Elimination of political opponents; Consolidation of power; Anti-Buddhist sentiment

The Stalinist repressions in Mongolia, known in Mongolia as the Great Repression, (Note: Mongolian: Их Хэлмэгдүүлэлт, romanized: Ikh Khelmegdüülelt, pronounced [ix xe̝ɮməxtúːɮəɮtʰ]) was an 18-month period of heightened political violence and persecution in the Mongolian People's Republic between 1937 and 1939. The repressions were an extension of the Stalinist purges (also known as the Great Purge) unfolding across the Soviet Union around the same time. Soviet NKVD advisors, under the nominal direction of Mongolia's de facto leader Khorloogiin Choibalsan, persecuted thousands of individuals and organizations perceived as threats to the Mongolian revolution and the growing Soviet influence in the country. As in the Soviet Union, methods of repression included torture, show trials, executions, and imprisonment in remote forced labor camps, often in Soviet gulags.

Estimates differ but anywhere between 20,000 and 35,000 "enemies of the revolution" were executed, a figure representing three to five percent of Mongolia's population at the time. Victims included those accused of espousing Tibetan Buddhism, pan-Mongolist nationalism, and pro-Japanese sentiment. Buddhist clergy, aristocrats, intelligentsia, political dissidents, and ethnic Buryats were particularly impacted.

== Background ==
=== Prelude (1921–1934) ===
Following the People's Revolution of 1921, infighting within the ruling Mongolian People's Revolutionary Party (MPRP) resulted in several waves of violent political purges, often instigated and aided by Comintern or Soviet agents and government advisors. In August 1922 Dogsomyn Bodoo, the first prime minister of the revolutionary period, and 14 others were executed without trial after confessing under torture by Soviet agents to conspiring to overthrow the government. Two years later, Bodoo's chief accuser Soliin Danzan was executed during the Third Party Congress for representing "bourgeois interests". In 1928, several prominent MPRP members including Ajvaagiin Danzan, Jamsrangiin Tseveen, Tseren-Ochiryn Dambadorj, and Navaandorjiin Jadambaa, were imprisoned or exiled in a widescale purge of suspected rightwingers as the country underwent more rapid collectivization, land expropriation, and persecution of the Buddhist clergy.

After those drastic measures resulted in popular uprisings in 1932, several of the MPRP's most hard-line leftists including Zolbingiin Shijee, Ölziin Badrakh, and Prime Minister Tsengeltiin Jigjidjav were blamed, officially expelled from the party, and later executed.

In 1933–34, in what is viewed as a precursor for the repressions of 1937–39, MPRP General Secretary Jambyn Lkhümbe and other MPRP elements, particularly Buryat-Mongols, were falsely accused of conspiring with Japanese spies. Over 1,500 people were implicated and 56 were executed. The public hysteria surrounding the Lhümbe Case was spurred in part by Japan's invasion of neighboring Manchuria in 1931. To defend against possible Japanese military expansion into the Soviet Far East, Stalin sought to stabilize Mongolia politically by eliminating opposition to the Soviet-backed government and securing an agreement to permit the stationing of Red Army troops in the country. Stalin had ordered for 100,000 Buddhist lamas in Mongolia to be liquidated, but the political leader Peljidiin Genden resisted the order.

== Great Repression ==
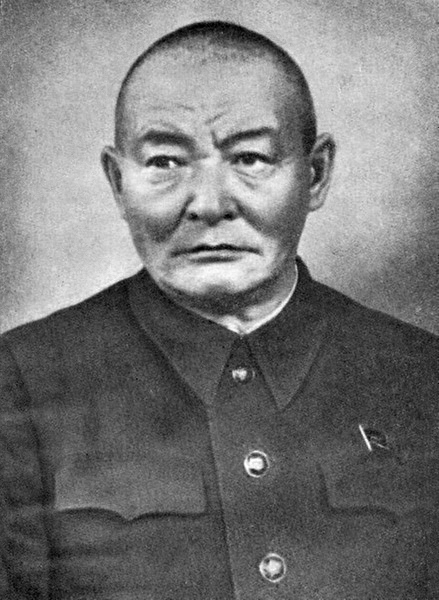
Khorloogiin Choibalsan in the 1930s

Over the next three years, Soviet mentors in the Ministry of Internal Affairs guided Choibalsan in planning and carrying out the impending purges. Under the direction of his Soviet handler Matvey Petrovich Chopyak, Choibalsan had the Internal Affairs Committee rules amended in May 1936 to facilitate the detention of high-ranking politicians without first consulting political superiors. Soon thereafter, 23 high-ranking lamas were arrested for participating in a "counter-revolutionary center." Following a yearlong trial they were publicly executed in early October 1937. When Mongolia's procurator general protested the lamas' prosecution, he too was arrested and then shot.

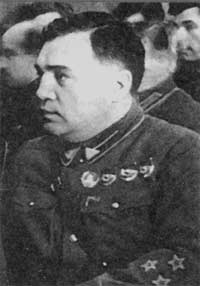
Deputy NKVD Chief Mikhail Petrovich Frinovsky

On 22 August 1937 Marshal Gelegdorjiin Demid, whose popularity Choibalsan had always resented, died under suspicious circumstances, resulting in Choibalsan's promotion to the dual role of sole commander-in-chief of the Mongolian People's Army and Minister of Defense. On 4 September Choibalsan issued Order 366, which declared that many in Mongolia "had fallen under the influence of Japanese spies and provocateurs." Alarmed by Japanese military movements in Manchuria, Stalin ordered that month the stationing of 30,000 Red Army troops in Mongolia and had dispatched a large Soviet delegation to Ulaanbaatar under Soviet Deputy NKVD Commissar Mikhail Frinovsky.

Charged with starting the violent purges that he had so effectively carried out in the Soviet Union under the NKVD Chief Nikolai Yezhov, Frinovsky delivered a list of 115 counter-revolutionaries and Japanese collaborators to Choibalsan, recommending they be purged. Working through Soviet advisers already embedded within the Ministry of Interior and with a compliant Choibalsan providing symbolic cover, Frinovsky built the purge framework from behind the scenes. He produced arrest lists and assembled an Extraordinary Purge Commission, an NKVD-style troika (headed by Choibalsan, with Minister of Justice Tserendorj and former MPRP Secretary Dorjjavyn Luvsansharav). They presided over arrest cases, investigations and show trials involving “lamas, espionage and counterrevolution.”

The arrest of 65 high-ranking government officials and intelligentsia on 10 September signaled the launch of the purges in earnest. All were accused of spying for Japan as part of a Genden-Demid plot and most confessed under intense torture. The first two-day show trial was staged at Ulaanbaatar's Central Theater, ending on 20 October. Of the 14 persons accused, 13, including former prime minister and chief abbot of the Manzushir Monastery Sambadondogiin Tserendorj, were sentenced to death.

What followed was a spasm of violence that lasted nearly 18 months. Choibalsan's troika approved and carried out the execution of more than 18,000 counter-revolutionary lamas. Monks that were not executed were conscripted into the Mongolian armed forces or otherwise forcibly laicized while 746 monasteries were liquidated. Thousands more dissident intellectuals, political and government officials labeled "enemies of the revolution," as well as ethnic Buryats and Kazakhs were rounded up and killed. Some 25 persons from top positions in the party and government were executed, 187 from the military leadership, 36 of the 51 members of the Central Committee.

Following the Russian model, Choibalsan opened gulags in the countryside to imprison dissidents, while others were transported to gulags in the Soviet Union. As the NKVD effectively managed the purge by staging show trials and carrying out executions, a frequently intoxicated Choibalsan was sometimes present during torture and interrogations of suspected counterrevolutionaries, including old friends and comrades. Choibalsan rubber-stamped NKVD execution orders and at times personally directed executions. He also added names of political enemies to NKVD arrest lists simply to settle old scores. Nevertheless, even when he attempted to spare victims by recommending leniency in certain cases, NKVD officers often overrode his decision.

=== End of the Great Repression ===
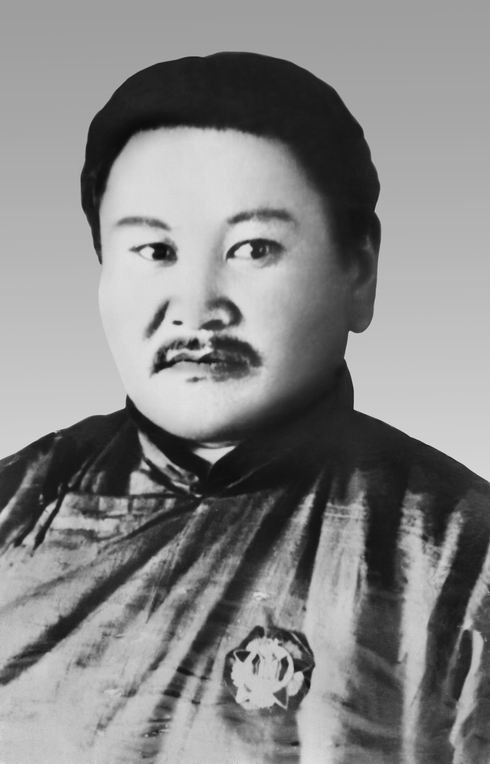
Genden

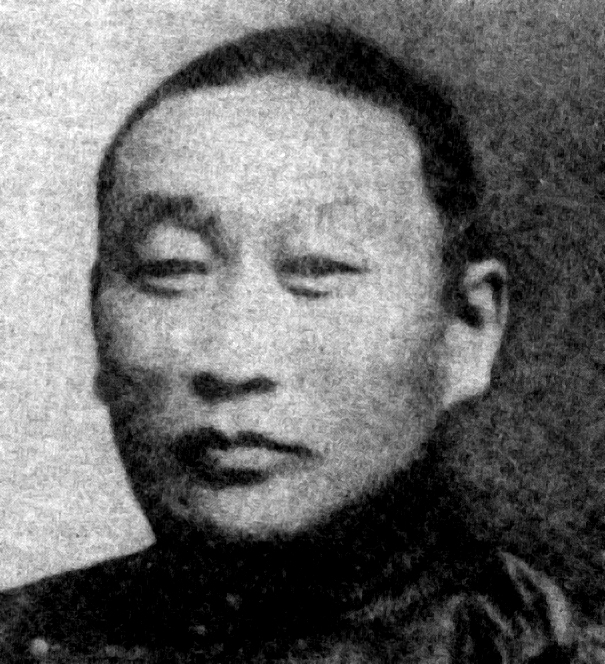
Amar

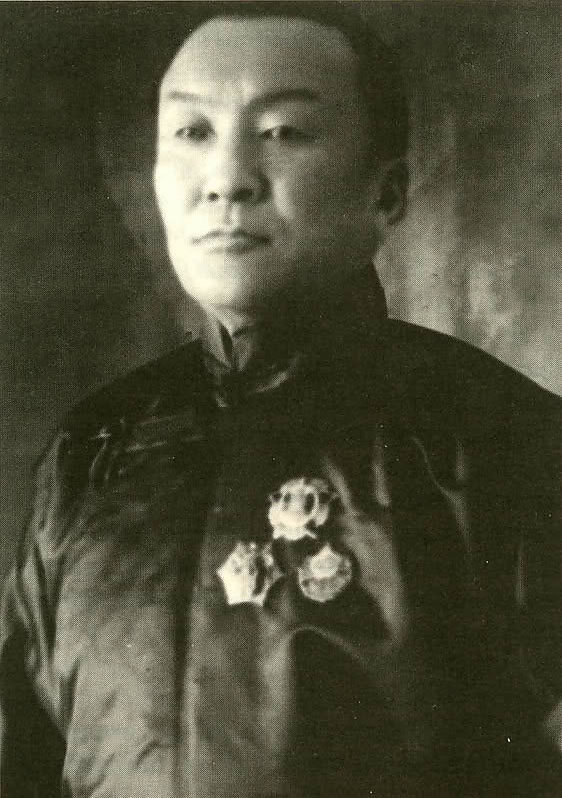
Dogsom

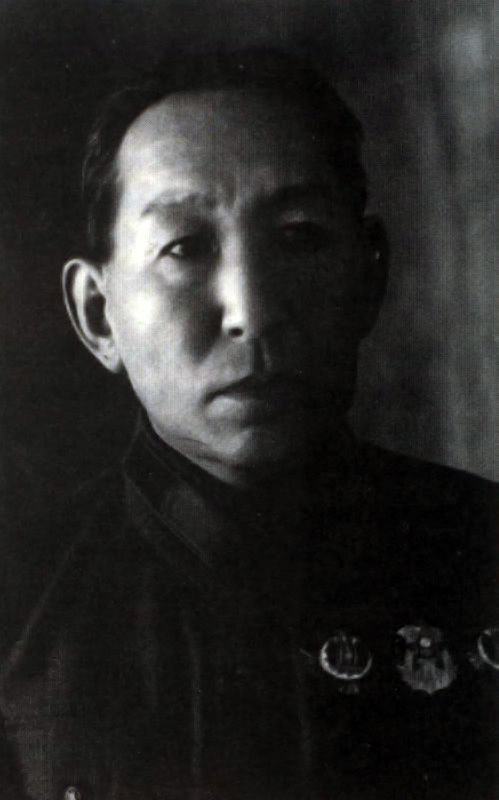
Losol

Notable victims of Choibalsan's purges include (from left); prime ministers P. Genden and A. Amar, and two of the founding members of the MPRP D. Dogsom and D. Losol

Racked with stress, Choibalsan spent six months (August 1938 – January 1939) recuperating and consulting with Kliment Voroshilov, Yezhov, and Stalin in Moscow and Sochi while NKVD agents and Interior Ministry officials carried on purge operations from Ulaanbaatar. When he returned to Mongolia, Choibalsan followed Soviet directives and had the highly popular Prime Minister Anandyn Amar purged. Choibalsan claimed he "had helped anti-government plotters, opposed their arrest, and neglected the defense of the borders. He betrayed his own country and was a traitor to the revolution." After a coordinated propaganda campaign, Amar was arrested on 7 March 1939 and sent to the USSR, where he was tried by a Soviet Troika and executed.

With Amar's removal, Choibalsan became Mongolia's uncontested leader, simultaneously holding the office of prime minister, minister for internal affairs, minister of war, and commander-in-chief of the Mongolian armed forces. Secured in his position, Choibalsan brought the terror to an end in April 1939 by declaring that the excesses of the purges had been conducted by overzealous party officials while he was away in the USSR, but that he had overseen the arrests of the real criminals. Official blame for the purges fell on Nasantogtokh, the deputy minister of internal affairs, and his former Soviet handler Kichikov. Later, other henchmen of the purge were arrested and executed, including Luvsansharav, Bayasgalan, Dashtseveg, and Luvsandorj. Dansranbilegiin Dogsom and Darizavyn Losol, the last two living members (besides Choibalsan himself) of the original seven founding members of the MPRP, were also arrested. Dogsom was executed in 1941. Losol died in a Soviet prison before his case came to trial.

== Legacy ==
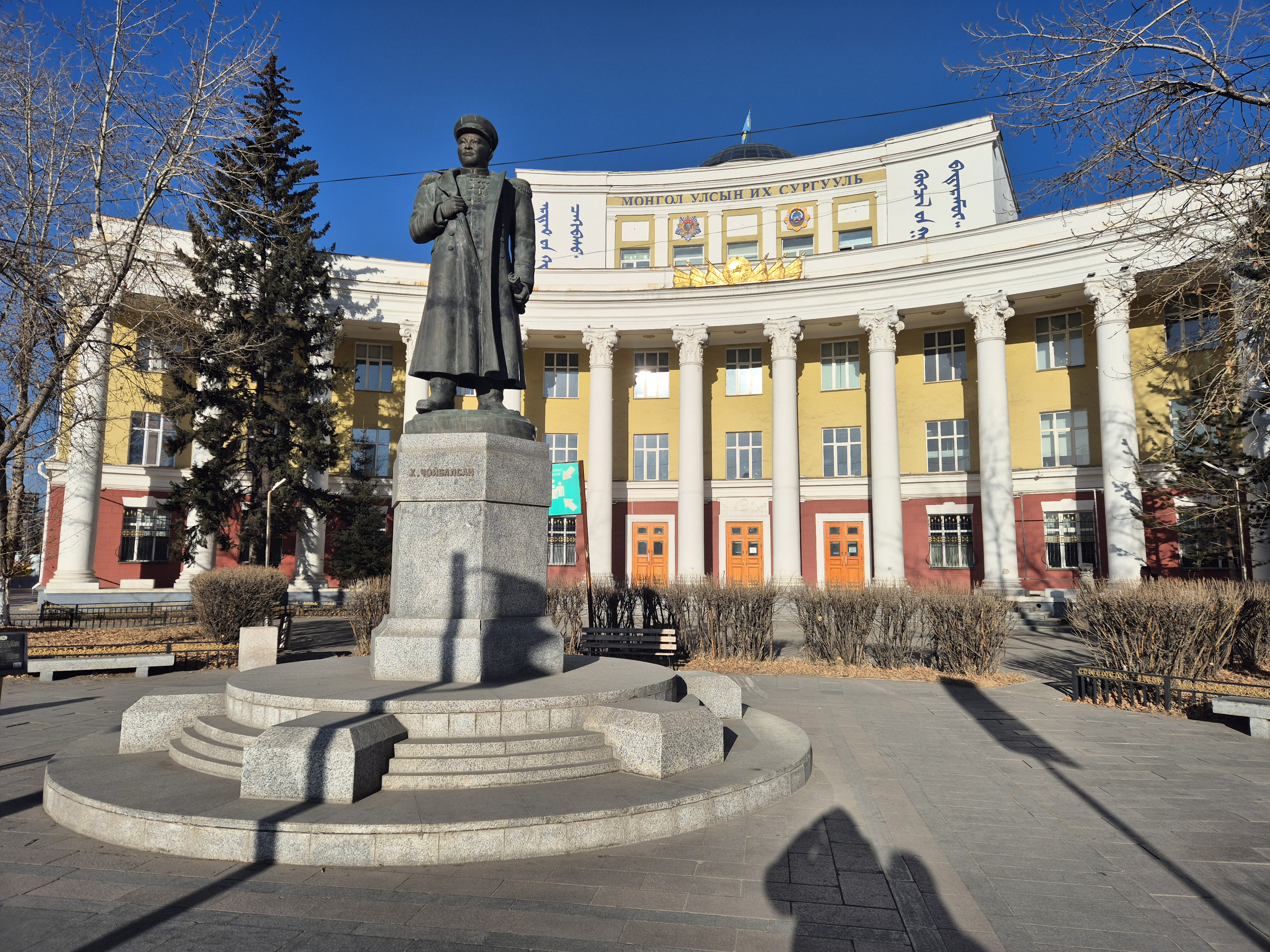
Choibalsan's statue stands in front of the National University of Mongolia in Ulaanbaatar

By the time the purges ended in early 1939, an entire stratum of Mongolian society had effectively been exterminated while much of Mongolia's cultural heritage lay in ruins. Approximately 18,000 lamas were condemned to death while thousands more were forcibly laicized and conscripted into the Mongolian People's Army. More than 700 Buddhist monasteries were destroyed. The old guard revolutionary class, viewed as heavily nationalist, was eliminated; 25 persons from top positions in the party and government were executed, 187 from the military leadership, and 36 of the 51 members of the Central Committee. Choibalsan became Mongolia's unquestioned leader backed by Soviet advisors, a growing Red Army presence in the country, and by younger apparatchiks who were more closely aligned with the Soviet Union, such as future leader Yumjaagiin Tsedenbal.

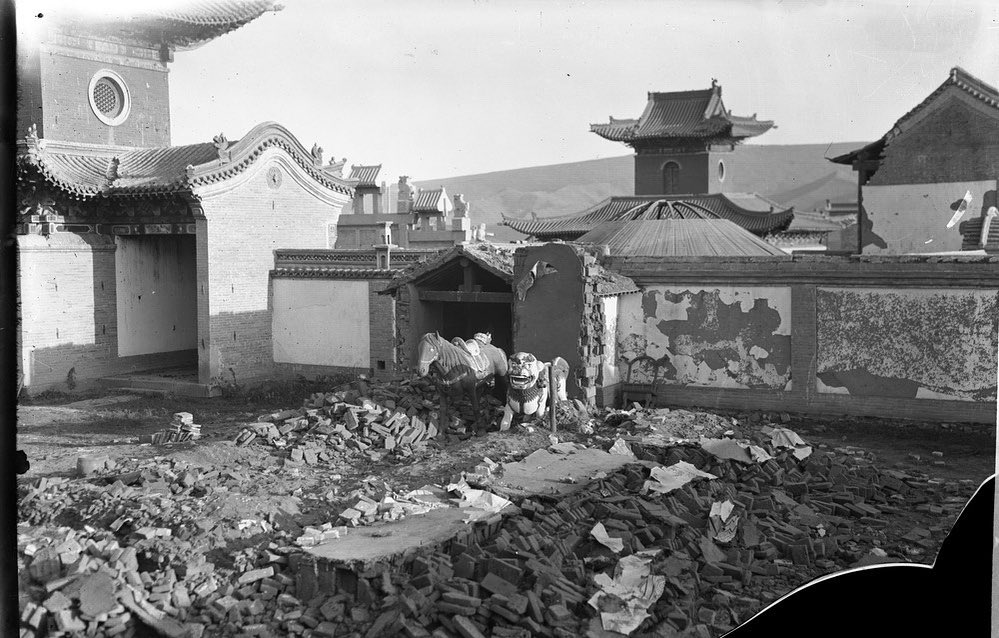
Choijin Lama Temple during the height of the repressions in 1937.

In the 50 years following the repressions, any public discourse on the matter was discouraged or condemned. At the time of his death in 1952, Choibalsan was widely mourned as a hero, a patriot, and ultimately a martyr for the cause of Mongolian independence. Remnants of his strong personality cult, as well as successful efforts by his successor Tsendenbal to obstruct "de-Stalinization" efforts that could have shed light on the purges, helped solidify the positive regard many Mongolians held of their former leader. Some scholars have suggested the inclination of Mongolians to avoid blaming Choibalsan for the purges is in effect an attempt to exonerate themselves for what happened. Public anger over the violence of the purges falls predominantly on the Soviet Union and the NKVD, with Choibalsan viewed sympathetically (if not pathetically) as a puppet with little choice but to follow Moscow's instructions or else meet the fate of his predecessors Genden and Amar.

With the end of communist rule in 1990, however, re-examination of the Socialist Era—and particularly the Great Repression—has occurred, and there does seem to be an attempt by some Mongolians to come to terms the country's past in a more general context. In 1991, mass graves of monks executed during the repressions were uncovered near Mörön, Khövsgöl Province and in 2003 in Khambyn Ovoo, Ulaanbaatar. The corpses of hundreds of executed lamas and civilians were unearthed, all killed with a single shot to the base of the skull. At the same time, there have been concerted efforts by various groups to restore many of the temples and monasteries that were destroyed during the purges.

== Notable victims ==
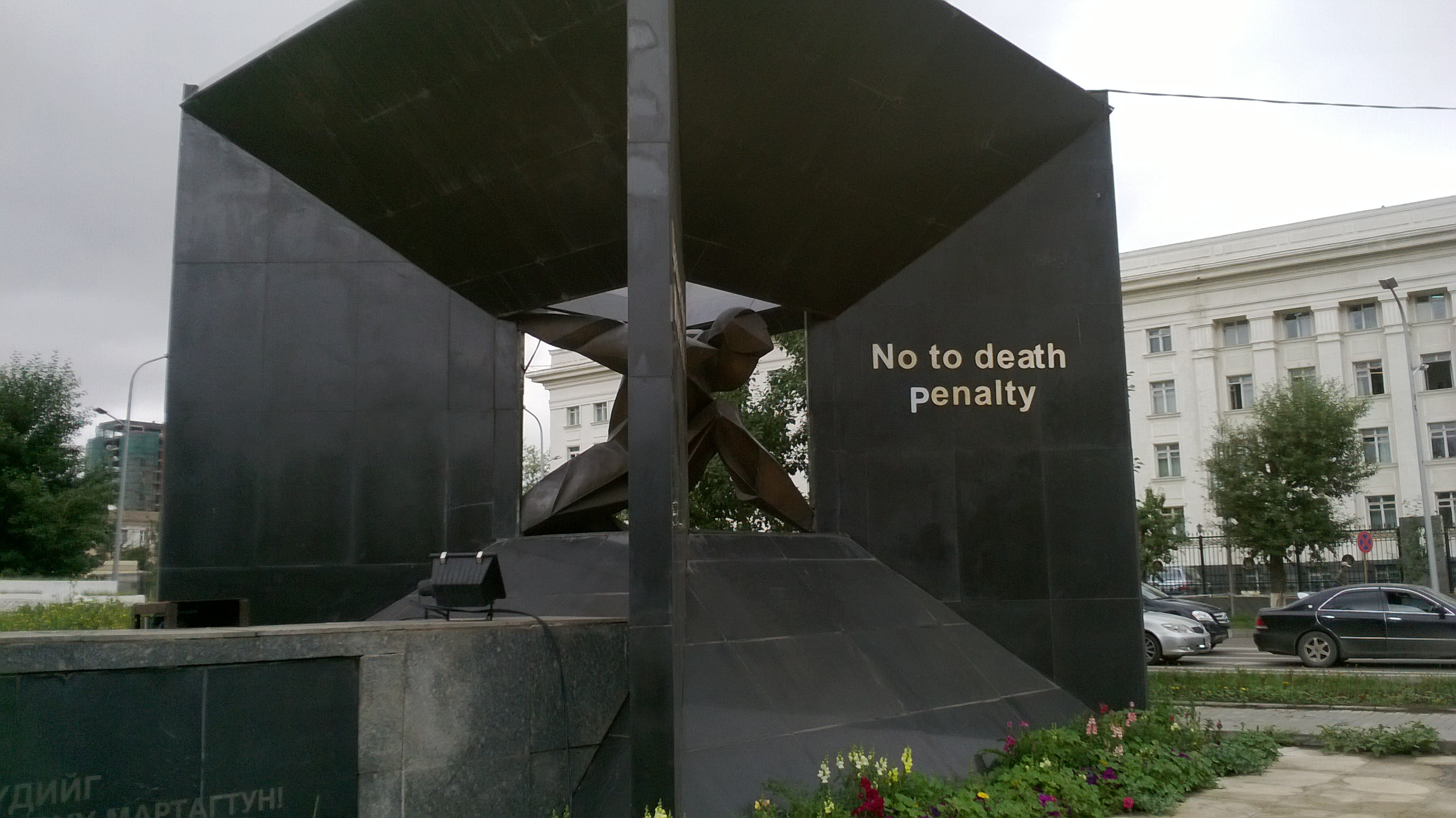
Monument dedicated to the memory of the political repression victims, erected in Ulaanbaatar, Mongolia in 1994

Memorial obelisk at the Kommunarka shooting ground, commemorating the 249 purged Mongolians

- Peljidiin Genden, Mongolian head of state from 1924 to 1927 and Prime Minister of Mongolia from 1932 to 1936
- Anandyn Amar, prime minister of Mongolia from 1928 to 1930 and 1936 to 1939, Mongolian head of state from 1932 to 1936
- Darizavyn Losol, revolutionary and founding member of the MPRP
- Gelegdorjiin Demid, Marshal of the Mongolian People's Republic from 1936 to 1937
- Dansranbilegiin Dogsom, Mongolian head of state from 1936 to 1939 and founding member of the MPRP
- Sambadondogiin Tserendorj, prime minister of Mongolia, 1921, chief abbot of Manjusri Monastery
- Shirnengiin Ayuush, musician, novelist, and art historian
- Ölziitiin Badrakh
- Jamtsangiin Damdinsüren, Mongolian head of state from 1927 to 1929
- Khas-Ochiryn Luvsandorj
- Losolyn Laagan, Mongolian head of state from 1930 to 1932
- Dorjjavyn Luvsansharav
- Tserendondovyn Navaanneren, 20th and last Setsen Khan
- Genepil, last Queen consort of the late Bogd Khan
- Zolbingiin Shijee
- Banzarjavyn Baasanjav, MPRP leader from 1936 to 1940

=== Buryats ===
A number of prominent Buryats connected to Mongolia were imprisoned and killed during the purges in the Soviet Union, among them:

- Jamsrangiin Tseveen
- Rinchingiin Elbegdorj
- Dashi Sampilon
- Erdene Batkhaan

== See also ==
- 1932 armed uprising (Mongolia)
- Port Arthur Case
- Lhümbe Case
- Buryat genocide
- Cultural Revolution
- Great Purge
- Katyn Massacre
- Khorloogiin Choibalsan
- Mass killings under communist regimes
- Stalinist repressions in Azerbaijan
