= Damdin Sükhbaatar =

Mongolian revolutionary (1893–1923)

Damdin Sükhbaatar Дамдины Сүхбаатар ᠳᠠᠮᠳᠢᠨ ᠤ ᠰᠦᠬᠡᠪᠠᠭᠠᠲᠤᠷ
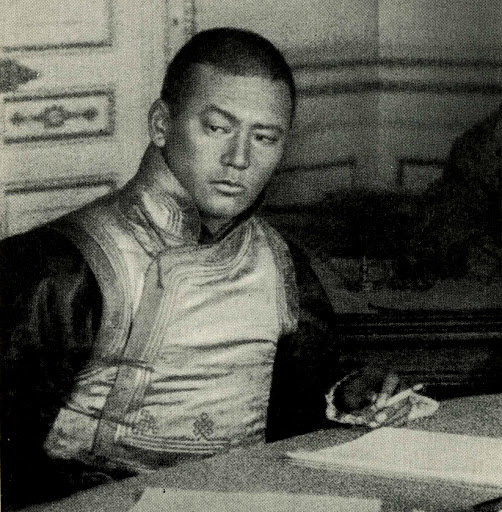
- Sükhbaatar c. 1920–22

Minister of War
- In office 11 July 1921 – 20 February 1923
- Monarch: Bogd Khan
- Succeeded by: Khatanbaatar Magsarjav

Commander-in-Chief of the Mongolian People's Army
- In office 9 February 1921 – 20 February 1923
- Monarch: Bogd Khan
- Succeeded by: Khorloogiin Choibalsan

Personal details
- Born: February 2, 1893 Khuree, Outer Mongolia, Qing Empire (present-day Ulaanbaatar, Mongolia)
- Died: 20 February 1923 (aged 30) Niislel Khüree, Bogd Khanate of Mongolia (present-day Ulaanbaatar, Mongolia)
- Spouse: Yanjmaa Sukhbaatar
- Occupation: Military leader, independence movement

Military service
- Allegiance: Bogd Khaanate of Mongolia
- Branch/service: Mongolian People's Army
- Years of service: 1911–1923
- Rank: Commander
- Battles/wars: Mongolian Revolution of 1921

Damdin Sükhbaatar (Note: /ˈdæmdɪn sʊxˈbɑːtər/ DAM-din suukh-BAH-tər; Mongolian: Дамдины Сүхбаатар, romanized: Damdinii Sükhbaatar, pronounced [tamtʲɪˈɲi sʰuxˈpaʰtə̆r]) (2 February 1893 – 20 February 1923) was a Mongolian revolutionary, founder of the Mongolian People's Party, and leader of the Mongolian partisan army that took Khüree during the Mongolian Revolution of 1921. For his part in the revolution, he was enshrined as the "Father of Mongolia's Revolution".

== Early life ==
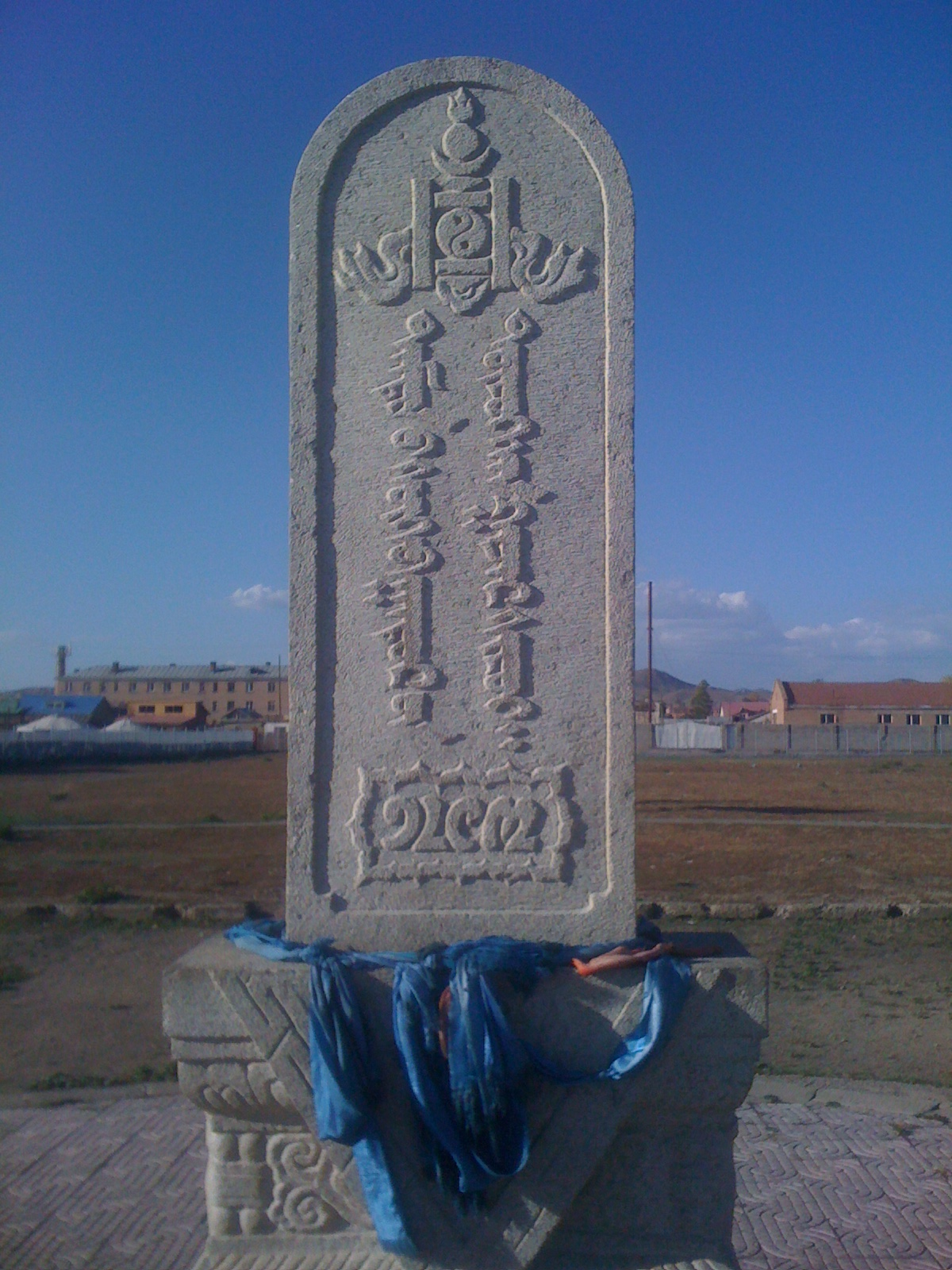
Monument marking Sükhbaatar's birthplace

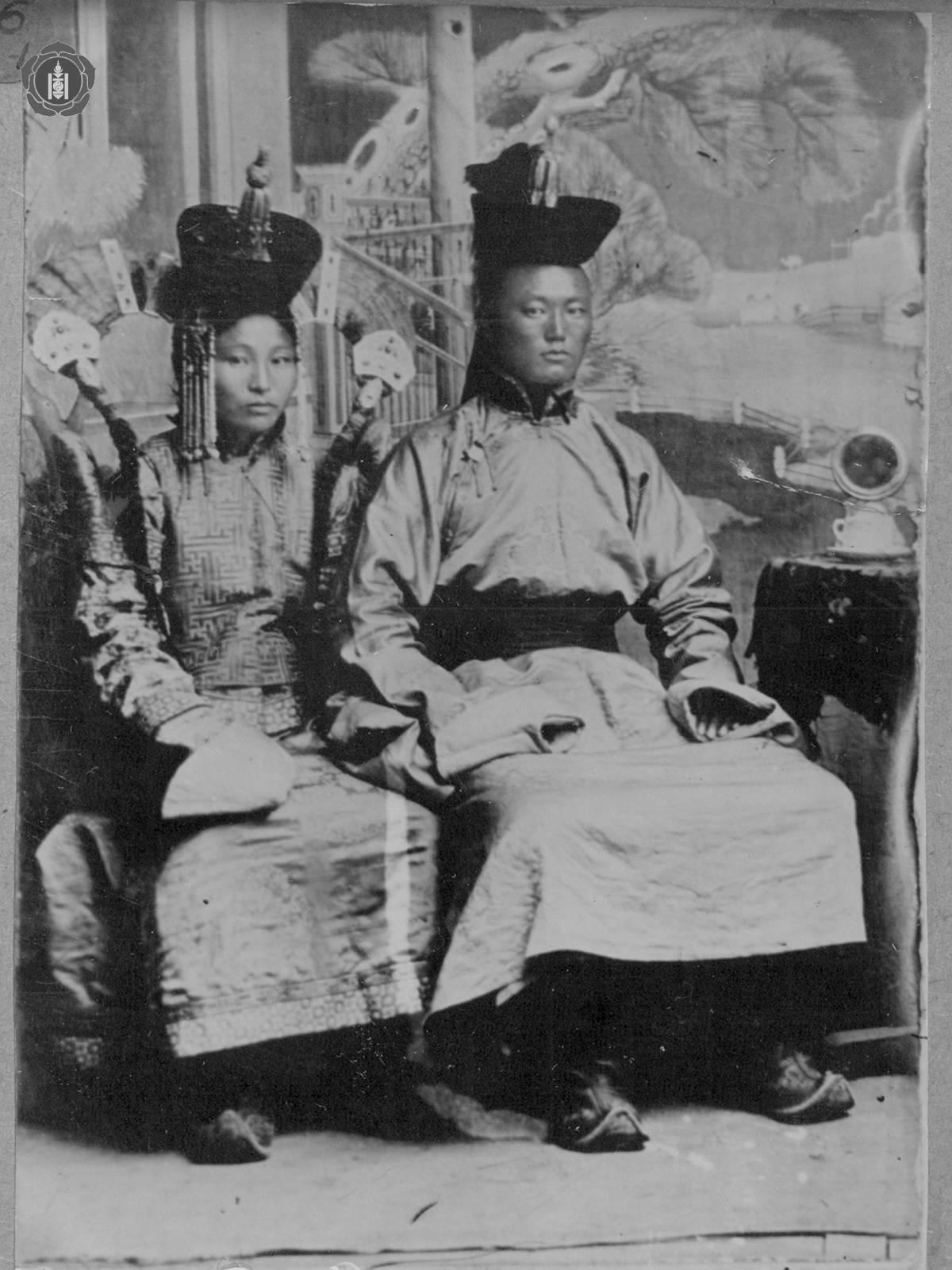
Sükhbaatar (right) with his wife Yanjmaa

Sükhbaatar (literally "Axe Hero" in Mongolian) was born in present-day Ulaanbaatar, the Chinese trading settlement some kilometers east of Ikh Khüree (later Niislel Khüree, now Ulaanbaatar), as the third of four children. His parents had deserted their home banner in Setsen Khan aimag, and his father lived from odd jobs and as a day laborer. When Sükhbaatar was six, the family moved close to the Russian consulate. It was from playing with the Russian children that he learnt to speak some Russian. At the age of 14, Sükhbaatar had the opportunity to get an education, from Zaisan Jamyan. From the age of 16 onwards, he worked as a proxy rider (at that time, people who were obliged to render certain services to the authorities often employed other people to replace them) for several years. After Mongolia's first declaration of independence in 1911, Sükhbaatar was drafted into the new nation's army.

== In the Bogd Khan's army ==
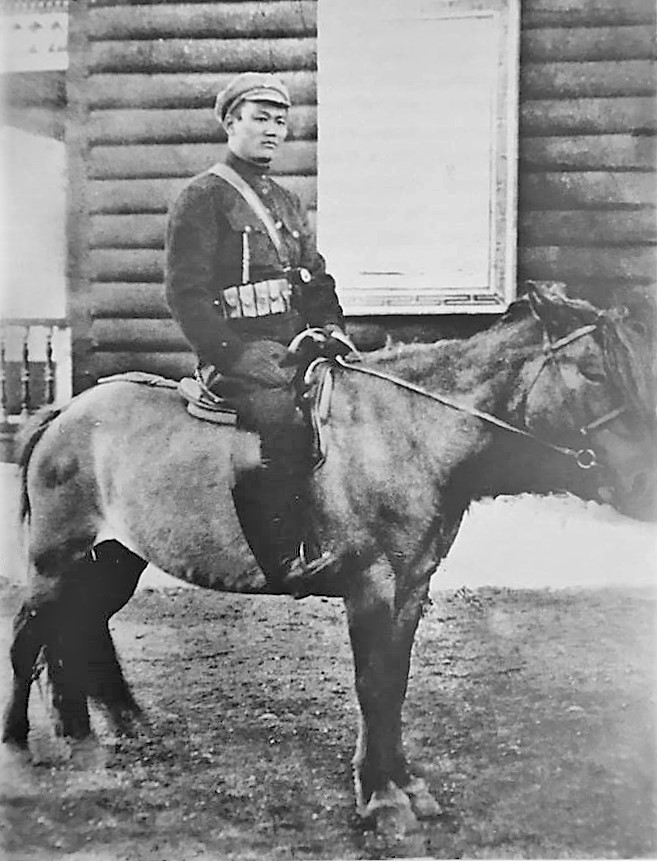
Sükhbaatar on horseback

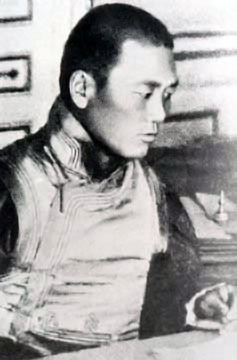
Sükhbaatar

In 1912, Russian advisers to the Bogd Khan set up a military school at Khujirbulan, and Sükhbaatar was one of the soldiers transferred there. His talent for military tactics and his skills at riding and shooting earned him the respect of his comrades, and after the training he became a platoon leader of the machine gun company at Khujirbulan. In 1913, he set up his own household with his wife Yanjmaa. They had had their first son in 1911, but Yanjmaa's parents objected to the relationship on the grounds that Sükhbaatar was too poor.

In late June 1914, Sükhbaatar was involved in a soldiers' riot against the bad living conditions and corruption in the army, but this episode seems to have had no negative repercussions for him. The so-called autonomous period was a rather unruly one, and in 1917 Sükhbaatar was deployed to Mongolia's eastern border, under the command of Khatanbaatar Magsarjav. In 1918, the Mongolian government set up a printing office for printing law codes and Buddhist texts, and Sükhbaatar was transferred there. The office was led by Jamyan, so one reason for this transfer may have been that Sükhbaatar's name had been forwarded by his old teacher. Another reason may have been that Sükhbaatar's superiors wanted to keep him apart from the other soldiers.

== Chinese occupation ==
Between 1918 and 1919, as Russia struggled with both revolution and civil war in the aftermath of World War I, the Chinese moved to reassert their rule of Outer Mongolia. Some nobles began negotiations with the Chinese amban Chen Yi on the subject of abolishing Mongolia's autonomy, and in autumn 1919 General Xu Shuzheng occupied Niislel Khüree and forced the Bogd Khan to sign an edict that incorporated Mongolia into the Republic of China. At about the same time, two secret groups that would later evolve into the Mongolian People's Party were founded, and Sükhbaatar was a member of one of them. After the Chinese takeover, the printing office was closed and the army dispersed, so Sükhbaatar became jobless.

The two secret groups united in early 1920, and began putting up posters in which they criticized the new rulers. They began gathering intelligence on the Chinese forces in Khüree, and on the attitudes of the Bogd Khan, other high lamas, and the upper nobles, towards the Chinese. Also, they established contacts with some revolutionaries among Khüree's Russian community. In mid-1920, several Comintern agents convinced the secret group to send a delegation to Irkutsk. Consequently, the group was renamed the Mongolian People's Party on June 25, 1920, and lots were drawn to see who would travel to Russia to obtain Soviet support. Danzan and Choibalsan left in early July, Bodoo and Chagdarjav followed in mid-July. On July 25, the remaining group succeeded, via Da Lama Puntsagdorj, in obtaining a letter in which the Bogd Khan asked Soviet Russia for support against the Chinese. With this letter, Sükhbaatar, Darizavyn Losol, and Dansranbilegiin Dogsom left for Russia in late July, 1921. Sükhbaatar was in charge of smuggling the Bogd Khan's letter through the Chinese checkpoints, and the hollowed handle of his whip he used for this purpose is today displayed in a museum in Ulaanbaatar.

== People's Revolution ==
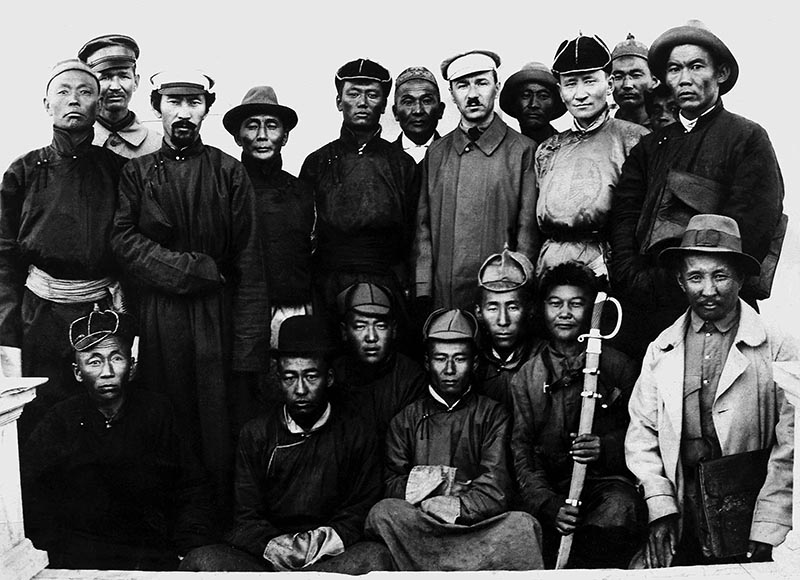
Back row from left:?,?, Rinchingiin Elbegdorj, Soliin Danzan, Damdin Sükhbaatar, Ajvaagiin Danzan, Shumyatskii, ?, Dogsomyn Bodoo

By August 19, 1920, the Mongolian delegates had all reached Irkutsk and met with a representative of the Soviet Russian Government, named Gapon. Gapon relayed that Soviet Russia was ready to help Mongolia, but that the delegates should explain what kind of government they wanted to establish, how they would fight against the foreign enemy, and what their future policy would be like. In early September, Danzan, Losol, and Chagdarjav were sent on to Moscow via Omsk, while Sükhbaatar and Choibalsan were to remain in Irkutsk for military training and to maintain contact between the delegation in Moscow and Mongolia. Bodoo and Dogsom were sent back to Khüree.

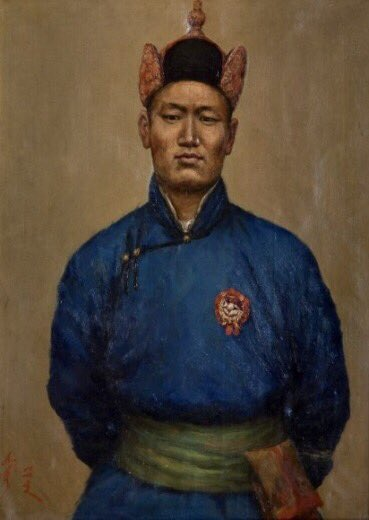
Painting of Sükhbaatar

In the meantime, the Chinese had imprisoned a number of members and sympathizers of the secret group. In late 1920, White Russian forces under Lieutenant General Baron Ungern had entered Mongolia from the east, and in late February 1921 occupied Niislel Khüree. Choibalsan and Chagdarjav were sent back into Mongolia to establish contacts with nationalist-minded nobles and other leaders. On February 9, Sükhbaatar was appointed commander-in-chief of the Mongolian People's Partisans. He began recruiting soldiers, and on February 20 the partisans had their first engagement with Chinese troops, followed by other encounters in the following days. At the founding congress of the Mongolian People's Party (MPP) at Kyakhta on March 1–13, 1921, Sükhbaatar was again appointed commander-in-chief and elected into the newly established provisional government.

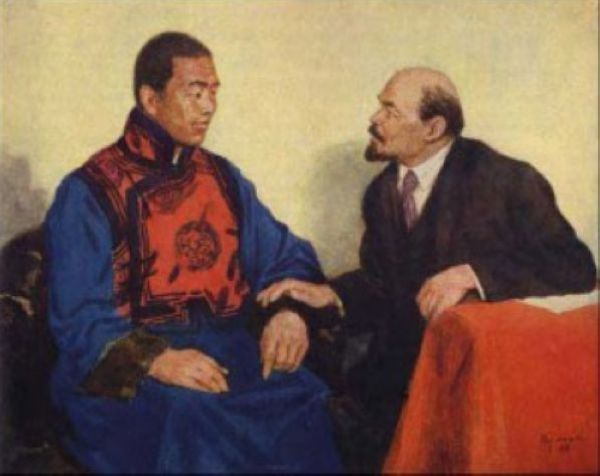
Painting depicting Sükhbaatar meeting Vladimir Lenin in Moscow

Immediately after the congress, the provisional government and the MPP central committee decided to seize the Mongolian part of Khiagt from the Chinese troops, and on February 15 an ultimatum was sent to the Chinese military authorities in the town. The Chinese commanders refused to surrender, and on March 18, Sükhbaatar's troops succeeded in taking the town, despite being heavily outnumbered. This day is now the official holiday of Mongolia's army, and is usually celebrated as the equivalent of Defender of the Fatherland Day in Russia. The provisional government moved to the Mongolian part of Khiagt and began to establish Ministries of the Army, Finances and Foreign Affairs, but when a fire in the aftermath of the battle burnt down the greater part of the town, the government moved on to Altanbulag.

At the end of May 1921, Khiagt came under pressure from Baron Ungern's forces, who moved towards Soviet Russia. This offensive was repulsed by mid-June, with the help of troops of the Far Eastern Republic. At the end of June, the People's Partisans and the Red Army decided to attack Khüree. They reached the town on July 6, having destroyed smaller groups of Ungern's forces on the way.

On July 11, a new government was proclaimed, with Sükhbaatar becoming Minister of the Army and the Bogd Khan's powers limited to those of a rather symbolic nature.

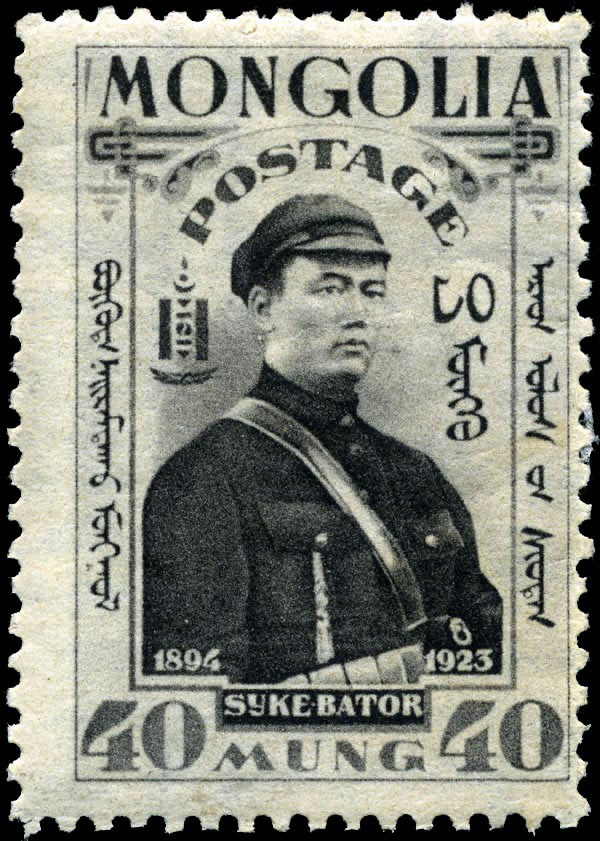
Mongolian postage stamp of 1932 showing Sükhbaatar

== Death ==
The new government was not in a secure position, and rumours of anti-communist plots increased. In 1922, Bodoo, Chagdarjav, Da Lama Puntsagdorj and others were executed on allegations that they had collaborated with internal and external enemies of the new state. In early 1923, amid official suspicions that a coup was planned for Tsagaan Sar, the state of alert became too exhausting for Sükhbaatar. He broke down on the night of February 14/15, and died on February 20. In the 1940s under Choibalsan's reign, it was alleged that Sükhbaatar had been poisoned, but later socialist publications did not explicitly discuss the cause of death. Nonetheless, this version is still somewhat popular in Mongolia. Some historians say that he died of pneumonia, because of cold rain. Neither version could be proved officially.

Elbeg Rinchino, the then-chairman of the Military Council, the highest authority in Mongolia, presided over his funeral and burial services. Mongolia's capital was renamed Ulaanbaatar ("Red Hero") in 1924. The Order of Sukhbaatar became the highest decoration of the Mongolian state. In 1954, he was exhumed from his grave at Altan-Ölgii National Cemetery and reinterred in the newly built mausoleum at Sükhbaatar Square. When the mausoleum was dismantled in 2005, he was cremated and his ashes buried in Altan-Ölgii again. His cremation was supervised by Buddhist monks.

Sükhbaatar's widow Yanjmaa went on to serve in a number of senior positions in the Mongolian government, including acting president.

== Commemorations ==
- A statue of Sükhbaatar stands at Sükhbaatar Square in front of the government building in Ulaanbaatar today.
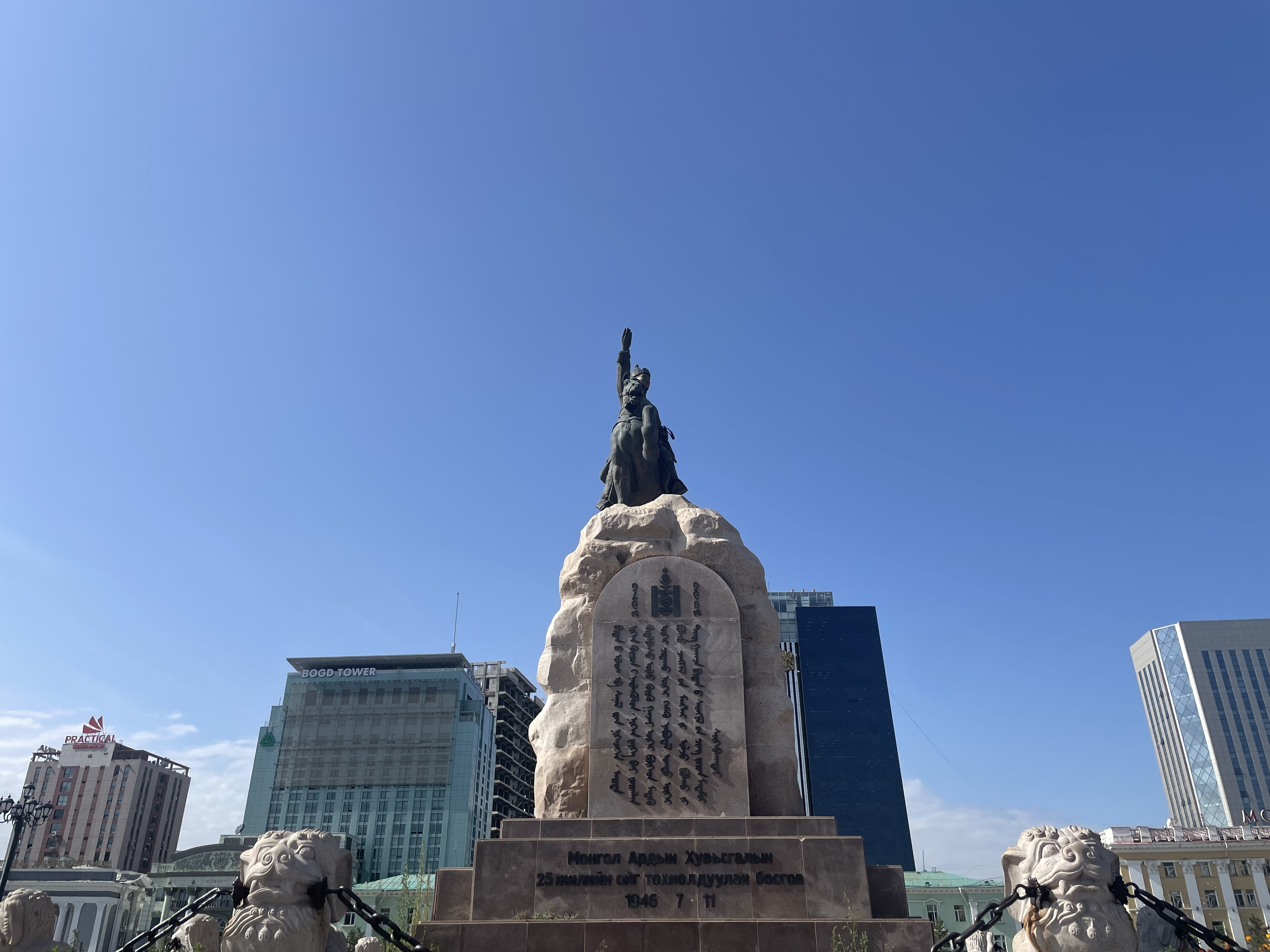
  Statue of Damdin Sükhbaatar
- Other places named after Sükhbaatar include Sükhbaatar Province, the capital of Selenge Province, and a district of Ulaanbaatar.
- The Sukhe-Bator Officers' School was named after him.
- Mongolian bank notes between 5 and 100 tögrög (1993 series) feature an image of Sükhbaatar, with higher denomination notes bearing the portrait of Genghis Khan.
- His Name Is Sukhe-Bator (1942) Soviet Mongolian drama film directed by Iosif Kheifits and Aleksandr Zarkhi.
- Ulaan Tug (Mongolian: Улаан Туг, literally "Red Banner") is a Mongolian revolutionary song that was penned by Sukhbaatar. It was first heard being sung by soldiers, with Sukhbaatar explaining to painter Nicholas Roerich that he had composed during the 1915 Mongolia–China conflict. It was later adapted by Colonel Navaany Tserenpil (known as the Mongolian March King) for parade. The march is one of the signature marches of the Military Band of the Mongolian General Staff, used during ceremonies such as the unfurling of the national flag or unit colours.

== See also ==
- History of Mongolia

== Sources ==
- Urgunge Onon, Mongolian Heroes of the 20th Century, New York 1976, pp. 143–192 (mainly a translation of L. Bat-Ochir and D. Dashjamts, The Life of Sükhbaatar, Ulaanbaatar 1965)
