= Dumaagiin Sodnom =

Former prime minister of Mongolia

- Думаагийн Содном
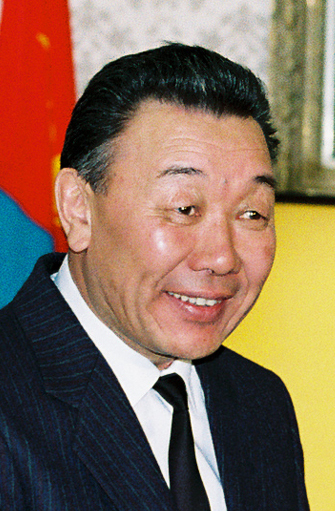
- Sodnom in 1990

14th Chairman of the Council of Ministers
- In office 12 December 1984 – 21 March 1990
- General Secretary: Jambyn Batmönkh; Gombojavyn Ochirbat
- Preceded by: Jambyn Batmönkh
- Succeeded by: Sharavyn Gungaadorj

Minister of Finance
- In office 1963–1969
- Preceded by: Bamdariin Dugersuren
- Succeeded by: Tsendiin Molom

Personal details
- Born: 14 July 1933 (age 93) Örgön, Dornogovi, Mongolia
- Party: Mongolian People's Party (since 1954)
- Education: Irkutsk Financial and Economic Institute
- Profession: Politician, economist

Dumaagiin Sodnom (Mongolian: Думаагийн Содном; born 14 July 1933) is a retired Mongolian politician and economist who served as the 14th Prime Minister of Mongolia (Chairman of the Council of Ministers) from 1984 to 1990.

== Early life and education ==
Sodnom was born in the Örgön District of Dornogovi Province on 14 July 1933. He first attended school in the Bayanmönkh District of Khentii Province and then went on to study at the Finance and Economic Technical College in Ulaanbaatar from 1946 to 1950. He worked as an accountant at the Ministry of Finance for four years and joined the Mongolian People's Revolutionary Party (MPRP) in 1954 before studying economics at the Irkutsk Financial and Economic Institute in Irkutsk from 1954 to 1958.

== Political career ==
Sodnom then went on to work his way up through the Finance Ministry until he became Minister of Finance in 1963, a position he held until 1969. From 1969 to 1972, he served as the first deputy chairman of the State Planning Commission and was promoted to chairman in 1972. In 1974, he was appointed as he deputy chairman of the Council of Ministers.

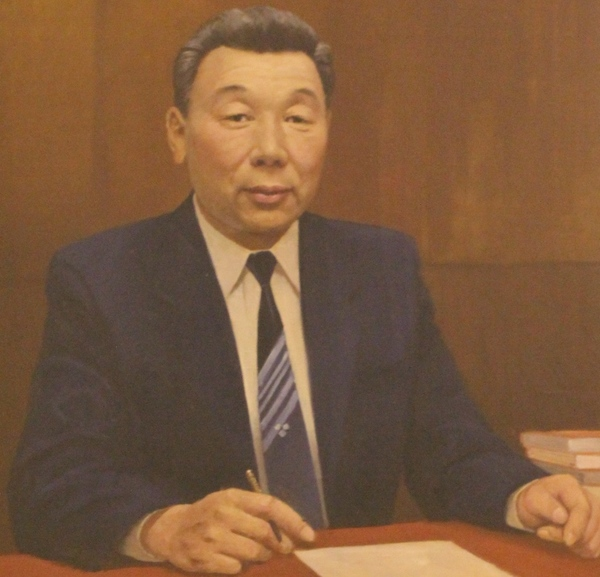
Official painting of Sodnom at the Government Palace

On 12 December 1984, Sodnom was appointed chairman of the Council of Ministers, or prime minister, and was elected a member of the MPRP Politburo following the ouster of Yumjaagiin Tsedenbal from the chairmanship of the Presidium of the People's Great Khural and the ascension of Sodnom's political ally Jambyn Batmönkh to the position. Sodnom held both positions until the resignation of the Politburo and government on March 21, 1990 during anti-government demonstrations.

Sodnom subsequently went on to serve as the director of the Mongolian Gazryn Tos petroleum company from 1990 to 2001, and then he was appointed as an aide to Prime Minister Puntsagiin Jasrai in 1992. In his post-premiership years, he remained supporter of a planned economy.

Political offices
Preceded by Jambyn Batmönkh	Prime Minister of Mongolia; 1984 – 1990	Succeeded by Sharavyn Gungaadorj
