= Ministry of Finance (Mongolia) =

Government ministry of Mongolia

Ministry of Finance of Mongolia
- Монгол Улсын Сангийн яам

Agency overview
- Formed: 29 December 1911
- Jurisdiction: Government of Mongolia
- Headquarters: S.Danzan St, Government Building II, Block D, Ulaanbaatar, Mongolia
- Employees: 167
- Annual budget: MNT 22.2 billion (about US$7.8 million) (2020)
- Minister responsible: Javkhlan Bold
- Child agencies: Customs General Administration of Mongolia; General Department of Taxation
- Website: Official website

The Ministry of Finance of Mongolia (MOF; Mongolian: Монгол Улсын Сангийн яам) is responsible for managing the public finances of Mongolia.

== Ministers of Finance ==
- Gadinbalyn Chagdarjav, 1911- 1915
- Luvsanbaldan, 1915 - 1919
- Gombojavyn Luvsantseveen, 1920 - 1921
- Dambyn Chagdarjav, 13 March 1921 - 17 April 1921
- Darizavyn Losol, 17 April 1921 - 10 July 1921
- Soliin Danzan, 10 July 1921 - 6 April 1923
- Bunibazaryn Dorj, 1923 - 1924
- Ölziin Badrakh, 1924 - 1925
- Jigmediin Altangerel, 1925 - 1926
- Sanjiin Dovchin, 1926 - 1939
- Yumjaagiin Tsedenbal, 1939 - 1940
- Sonomyn Luvsan, 1940 - 1941
- Tserenjavyn Byambaa, 1941 - 1946
- Demchigiin Molomjamts, 1948 - 1957
- Bamdariin Dügersüren, 1957 - 1963
- Dumaagiin Sodnom, 1963 - 1969
- Tsendiin Molom, 1969 - 1979
- Erdeniin Byambajav, 1979 - 1984
- Demchigjavyn Molomjamts, 1984 - 1990
- Ayuurzanyn Bazarkhüü, 1990 - 1992
- Dalrain Davaasambuu, 1992 - 1995
- Puntsagiin Tsagaan, 1996 - 1998
- Bat-Erdeniin Batbayar, 1998 - 1999
- Yansanjavyn Ochirsükh, 1999 - 2000
- Chültemiin Ulaan, 2000 - 2004
- Norovyn Altankhuyag, 2004 - 2006
- Nadmidyn Bayartsaikhan, 2006 - 2007
- Chültemiin Ulaan, 2007 - 2008
- Sangajavyn Bayartsogt, 2008 - 2012
- Chültemiin Ulaan, 2012 - 2014
- Jargaltulgyn Erdenebat, 2014 - 2015
- Bayarbaataryn Bolor, 2015 - 2016
- Battogtokhyn Choijilsüren, 2016 - 2017
- Chimediin Khürelbaatar, 2017 - 2021
- Boldin Javkhlan, 2021 - present
