= Dogsomyn Bodoo =

Mongolian politician (1885–1922)

Dogsomyn Bodoo Догсомын Бодоо
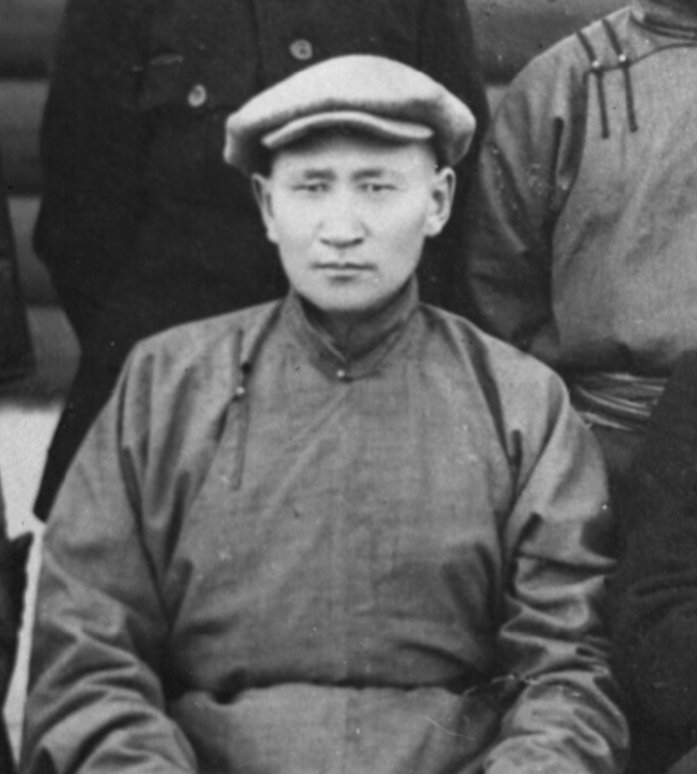
- Bodoo in 1921

5th Prime Minister of Mongolia
- In office 16 April 1921 – 7 January 1922
- Preceded by: Dambyn Chagdarjav
- Succeeded by: Jalkhanz Khutagt Sodnomyn Damdinbazar

Personal details
- Born: 1885 Mandshir Hutagt, Töv Province, Outer Mongolia, Qing China
- Died: 31 August 1922 (aged 37) Khüree, Mongolia

Dogsomyn Bodoo (Note: Mongolian: Догсомын Бодоо, romanized: Dogsomiin Bodoo, [tɔqsɞ̜ˈmiŋ pɔˈtɔ]) (1885 – 31 August 1922) was a Mongolian politician who was one of the founding members of the Mongolian People's Revolutionary Party. He was elected leader of the provisional revolutionary government and following the Outer Mongolian Revolution of 1921 became the country's first Prime Minister from July 1921 to January 1922. A power struggle led to his resignation on 7 January 1922. He was subsequently charged with treason for conspiring to overthrow the government, and was executed on 31 August 1922.

== Early life ==
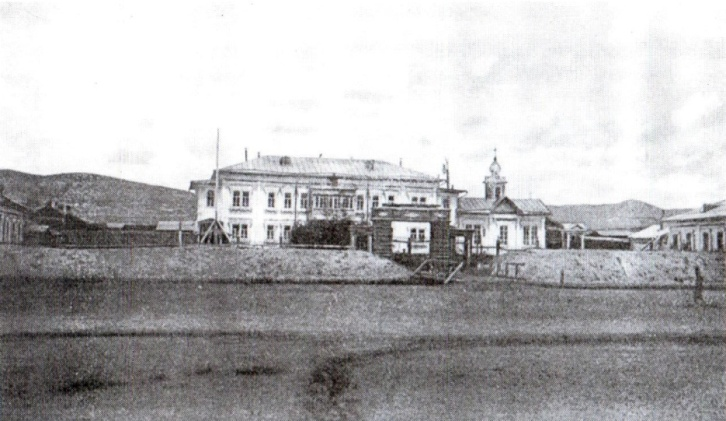
Bodoo headed the Consular Hill secret group, named after the region of Urga which ows its name to the Consulate of the Russian Empire which was located in that area

Bodoo was born in 1885 in Mandshir Hutagt in present-day Töv Province. He obtained his elementary education at the Manjusri Monastery and then studied at the Mongolian Language and Literature School in Khüree (present-day Ulaanbaatar). He later became a scribe at the Shaviyn Yaam (religious affairs office) and then a Mongolian Language teacher at the Russian-Mongolian School for Translators. He was literate in Mongolian, Tibetan, Manchu and Chinese. He became the Khüree representative of the Harbin newspaper Mongolyn Sonin Bichig and, under the pseudonym Bold or Bo, correspondent and editor of Shine Tol' and Niislel Hüreeniy Sonin Bichig newspapers.

== Founding of the Mongolian People's Party ==
Exposed to Russian Bolshevism through his contacts and acquaintances at the Russian consulate, Bodoo founded the secret anti-Chinese resistance and revolutionary organization Konsulyn Denj (Консулын дэнж or Consular Hill group) after the occupation of Khüree by the Chinese general Xu Shuzheng in late 1919. Other members of the group included Dambyn Chagdarjav, Darizavyn Losol, and Khorloogiin Choibalsan, who acted as Bodoo's Russian interpreter. Encouraged by contacts at the Russian consulate, Bodoo's group eventually merged with another resistance group Züün Hüree whose membership included Soliin Danzan, Dansrabilegiin Dogsom, and Damdin Sükhbaatar. On 25 June 1920, the new organization renamed itself the Mongolian People’s Party (MPP).

Bodoo was a member of the first MPP delegation that included Choibalsan, Danzan, Losol, Chagdarjav, Dogsom, and Sükhbaatar (the famous "First Seven") that journeyed to Russia to establish contact with the Soviets in 1920. He was named Minister of External Affairs in the provisional government at the MPP conference (subsequently regarded as the first congress of the Mongolian People's Revolutionary Party) held secretly in Troitskosavsk, Russia from 1 to 3 March 1921. A month later he was also named Prime Minister after Chagdarjav was relieved of the position.

== Prime minister ==
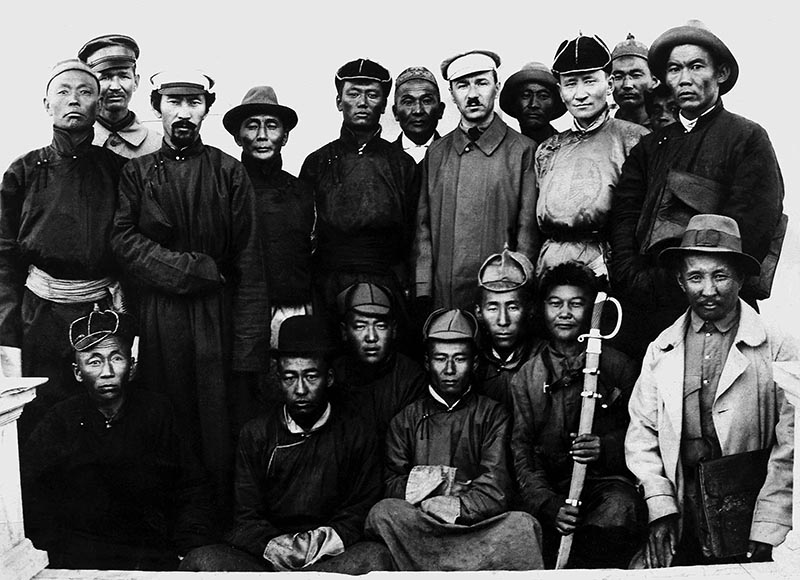
Back row from left: unknown, unknown, Rinchingiin Elbegdorj, Soliin Danzan, Damdin Sükhbaatar, Ajvaagiin Danzan, Shumyatskii, unknown, Bodoo

Bodoo became the Prime Minister and Foreign Minister of the revolutionary government following the liberation of Khüree from forces loyal to Roman von Ungern-Sternberg by joint Mongol and Red Army forces on 6 July 1921. He signed and issued Mongolia's Declaration of Independence on 14 September 1921.

Soon thereafter, however, the political rivalry between Bodoo and Soliin Danzan intensified when Danzan lost his seat as party leader to a relative of Bodoo's. Danzan, who was Minister of Finance, engineered various plots to oust the Prime Minister from office by persuading influential figures that Bodoo was "short-tempered, short-sighted" and not a serious person.

== Downfall ==
Danzan's accusations gained traction in late 1921 after Bodoo's campaign (initially instigated by the Soviets) to "modernize" the people by forcibly cutting off “feudal” ornaments from Mongolian deels such as large cuffs, women’s jewelry, and even long hair resulted in an angry public backlash. Sensing Bodoo's weak political position, Danzan accused him of plotting with the charismatic independence leader Ja Lama as well as with the Chinese and Americans, to undermine the revolution and establish an autocratic government. On 7 January 1922 Bodoo resigned from all of his positions within the government, ostensibly for health reasons.

== Death ==
Danzan nevertheless pursued charges against Bodoo until he was convicted of conspiring with reactionary enemies to destroy the government. Bodoo and several other former ministers, including his predecessor Dambyn Chagdarjav, were arrested and interrogated by a Russian agent. Bodoo, along with 14 other "dissenters", was executed by shooting on 31 August 1922.

To blunt criticism of Bodoo's execution by powerful religious groups (Bodoo was a lama), party leaders including Sühkbaatar invited the Hutagt, or saint incarnate, Jalkhanz Khutagt Sodnomyn Damdinbazar to become the next prime minister.

Following his death, Bodoo was stigmatized by official historians as a traitor and counter-revolutionary, especially during Choibalsan's rule. His contributions to the revolution were, for the most part ignored and forgotten. Bodoo was rehabilitated in 1962.

== Notes ==
Political offices
Preceded by Dambyn Chagdarjav	Prime Minister of Mongolia; 1921–1922	Succeeded by Jalkhanz Khutagt Sodnomyn Damdinbazar
