= Soliin Danzan =

Mongolian revolutionary (1885–1924)

- Солийн Данзан
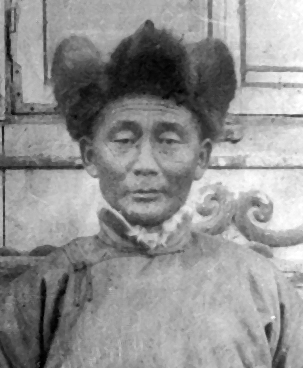
- Danzan in 1922

Chairman of the Mongolian People's Party
- In office 3 March 1921 – 21 September 1921
- Preceded by: Post established
- Succeeded by: Tseren-Ochiryn Dambadorj

Minister of Finance
- In office 11 July 1921 – 6 April 1923
- Preceded by: Darizavyn Losol
- Succeeded by: Bunibazaryn Dorj

Personal details
- Born: 1885 Tüsheet Khan, Outer Mongolia, China (modern-day Khotont, Arkhangai)
- Died: August 1924 (aged 38–39) Ulaanbaatar, Mongolia
- Party: Mongolian People's Party
- Known for: Communist revolutionary politics

Soliin Danzan (Mongolian: Солийн Данзан; 1885–1924) was a central figure in Mongolia's early revolutionary movement. He was a founding member of the Mongolian People's Party (later renamed the Mongolian People's Revolutionary Party or MPRP) in 1919 and later served as chairman of the Party Central Committee in 1921. Danzan orchestrated the purge and execution of Mongolia's first prime minister, Dogsomyn Bodoo in 1922, but then was himself purged and executed in 1924.

== Early life and revolution ==
Danzan was born in Tüsheet Khan Province (present day Arkhangai Province) in 1885. As a young man he made his living as a horse thief. Later he went on to work in Niislel Khüree (present day Ulaanbaatar) as a customs official in the Ministry of Finance. In 1919 Danzan, Dansrabilegiin Dogsom, and Damdin Sükhbaatar together established the clandestine nationalist group Züün Khüree (East Khüree) after General Xu Shuzheng's forces entered Niislel Khüree to re-assert Chinese sovereignty. Züün Khüree subsequently merged with the Konsulyn Denj group to form the MPRP in 1919, making Danzan one of the seven founders of the MPRP.

In July 1919 Danzan and Khorloogiin Choibalsan traveled to Verkhneudinsk, the capital of the Soviet Far Eastern Republic, in the first part of July where they met with Boris Shumyatsky, then acting head of the government. For three weeks Shumyatsky dodged their demands for a speedy Soviet decision whether or not to provide military assistance to the Mongolians against the Chinese. Danzan, Darizavyn Losol, and L. Dendev traveled to Omsk in August and then onto Moscow in September 1919 to further consult with Soviet authorities.

At first the Soviets were hesitant to provide the Mongolian revolutionaries with assistance for fear of unnecessarily antagonizing the Chinese. However, with the expulsion of Chinese troops from Niislel Khüree by the anti-Soviet Russian warlord Baron von Ungern-Sternberg in February 1921, the Soviets backed the MPRP. At the Soviet-organized first congress of the Mongolian People's Revolutionary Party was held secretly in Kyakhta between March 1–3, 1921, Danzan was elected chairman of the party's central committee. On 28 June, the main Soviet expeditionary corps along with a group of Mongolian partisans crossed the border into Mongolia, and on 6 July, the first Mongolian and Russian units entered Niislel Khüree.

== Purge of Bodoo ==
Within two months of the Mongolian Revolution and the establishment of the revolutionary government in July 1921, Danzan lost his seat as party leader to Tseren-Ochiryn Dambadorj, a relative of Prime Minister Dogsomyn Bodoo. The move intensified the political rivalry between Bodoo and Danzan who, as Minister of Finance, engineered various plots to remove the Prime Minister from office. He exploited the angry public backlash to Bodoo's unpopular campaign (initially instigated by the Soviets) to "modernize" the people by forcibly cutting off “feudal” ornaments from Mongolian deels such as large cuffs, women's jewelry, and even long hair. Danzan also accused the Prime Minister of plotting with the independence leader Ja Lama and with the Chinese and Americans to undermine the revolution and establish an autocratic government. Even after Bodoo resigned from all of his positions within the government for health reasons on January 7, 1922 Danzan pursued charges against him until he was convicted of counterrevolution. Bodoo was executed by shooting on August 31, 1922.

== Political rivalries ==
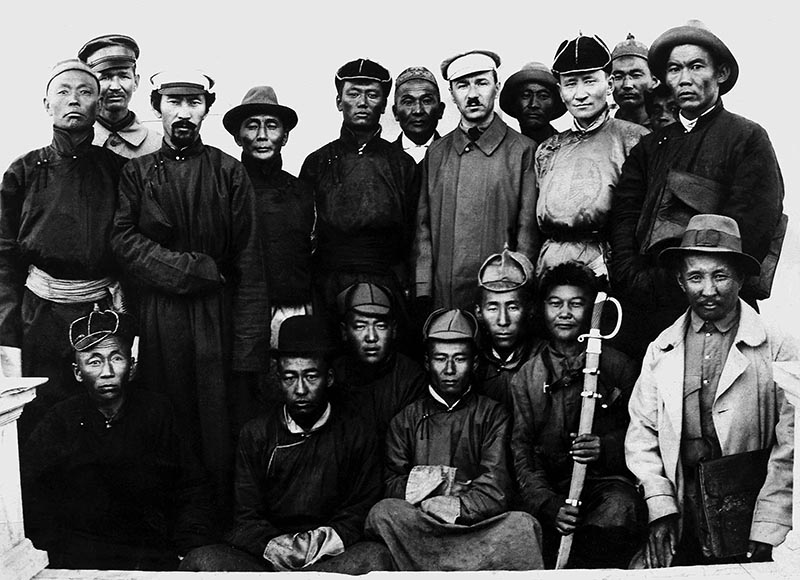
Mongolian revolutionaries; Back row from left:?,?, Rinchingiin Elbegdorj, Soliin Danzan, Damdin Sükhbaatar, Ajvaagiin Danzan, Shumyatsky, ?, Dogsomyn Bodoo

Political infighting continued within the party and a rivalry developed between Danzan and Rinchingiin Elbegdorj, leader of the leftists and chief adviser to the Comintern in Ulaanbaatar. After he was elected member of the Presidium of the Central Committee of the MPRP in February 1923, Danzan angered Elbegdorj and the Comintern by seeking to reduce the number of Soviet advisers in Mongolia, attempting to bring the radicalized Mongolian Revolutionary Youth League (MRYL) under party control, and resisting Soviet advice that Mongolia bypass capitalism and move directly to socialism. Danzan had a head for business and supported the introduction of limited capitalism into Mongolia's economic development. At one point he represented the American-Mongolian automobile company in Khüree and had been given a Harley-Davidson motorcycle by the American businessman W. Holman.

The conflict came to a head at the Third Party Congress in August 1924. Rinchingiin Elbegdorj and Dambadorj (head of the right-wing faction) both accused Danzan of representing bourgeois interests and engaging in business with American and Chinese firms. Danzan and Bavaasan, head of the Revolutionary Youth league, were arrested together with several other delegates, quickly put on trial, sentenced to death, and shot: all within a period of 24 hours while the party congress continued to meet. Nevertheless, the swiftness of Danzan's execution sent a shock wave through the party that consolidated the Soviet stranglehold on Mongolia.

In the decades that followed, Mongolian sources erased or ignored Danzan's prominent role in the formation and early years of the MPRP. He was vilified as a Japanese spy and a whisper campaign accused him of murdering Mongolia's revolutionary hero Sükhbaatar who had died unexpectedly in 1923 at the young age of 30. According to Ts. Batbayar, following their executions, "Bodoo and Danzan were stigmatized by official historians as traitors and counter-revolutionaries and their services to the revolution have for the most part been ignored or neglected."
