= Molom Tsend =

Mongolian statesman and economist (1932–2020)

- Цэндийн Молом
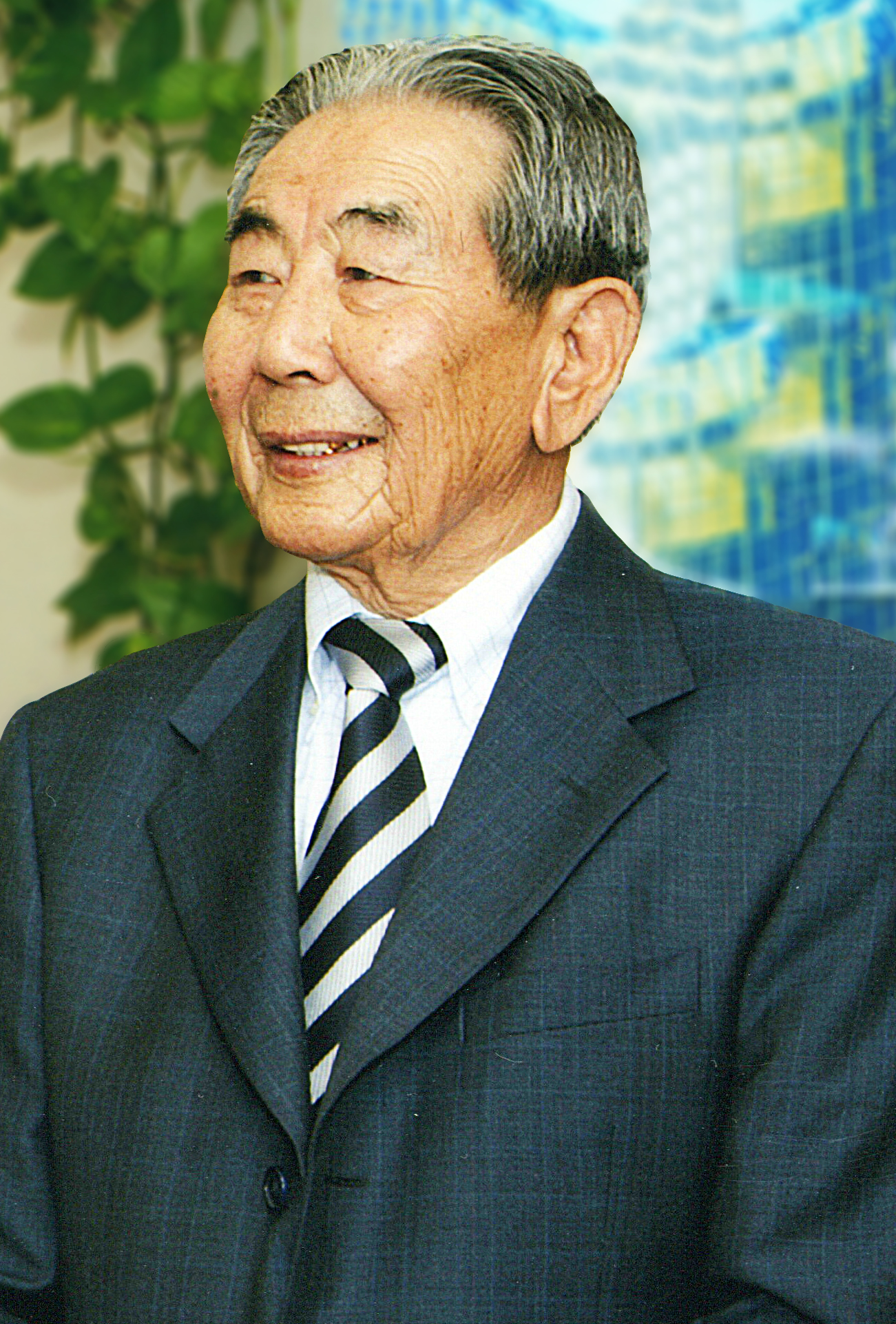
- Molom Tsendiin, 2017
- Born: August 15, 1932; Davst Soum, Uvs Aimag
- Died: November 10, 2020 (aged 88)
- Education: University of Finance and Economics
- Occupations: Politician, economist, commercial director

Molom Tsendiin (Mongolian: Цэндийн Молом; August 15, 1932 – November 10, 2020) was a Mongolian statesman, economist, member of Mongolian People's Revolutionary Party, member of State Great Khural (1969–1983), Minister of Finance (1969–1979) and Vice Prime Minister (1979–1983) of Mongolian People's Republic.

== Biography ==
Ts. Molom was born in Davst Soum, Uvs Aimag in the family of herdsman, Bor-Khulgana and his wife, Tsend. In elementary school the boy's surname was recorded under his mother's first name. At the age of 14, Ts. Molom enrolled in the College of Finance and Economics in Ulaanbaatar (University of Finance and Economics) and graduated in 1950 with a degree in economics and finance.

Ts. Molom began his career at the Ministry of Finance of the Mongolian People's Republic. In 1951, he was sent to Uvs Aimag as a financial inspector at the Executive Committee of the Khural of People's Representatives for two years.

In 1954, Ts. Molom enrolled in the Institute of Finance and Economics in Irkutsk, Russia (Baikal State University). After graduation in 1958, he continued to work in various organizations within the Ministry of Finance, MPR.

Ts. Molom was a talented economist, a professional leader, and an experienced statesman. He was well known for his expertise in diverse areas of finance. His tenure as Minister of Finance for ten years and six months made him the longest-serving Minister of Finance of Mongolia. Ts. Molom made significant contributions to strengthening the finance and credit system for the planned socio-economic development of the country, including the formation of an effective financial accounting system and the development of progressive methods of financial reporting, billing and taxation. One of the considerable reforms to the monetary system was the execution of an international agreement on the participation of the MPR in the System of multilateral payments in transferable roubles of the USSR. This strengthened the MNT exchange rate and stimulated the growth of the national foreign currency reserves. Ts. Molom is also credited with creating a nationwide insurance system.

While holding the post of chairman of the People's Control Committee (1979-1983), Ts. Molom strengthened this institution to set an example for the development of socialist democracy in the country. He advocated for the implementation of government decisions based on people's controllers' inspection reports. For this purpose, the first Congress of People's Controllers of the MPR was held in 1982.

As a commercial director of Mongolian Airlines (1985-1988), Ts. Molom supervised the construction of the capital's new airport, Buyant-Ukhaa. He participated in the transformation of the airline into an independent commercial enterprise. Ts. Molom worked to open direct international flights to and from the country. Upon his initiative, an international agreement on the collection of air traffic navigation fees for the flight of foreign airlines over the territory of Mongolia was established.

== Awards and titles ==
- Honorary Tradesman (1968)
- Honorary Worker of Finance and Banking Service (1970)
- Honorary Worker of Accounting and Statistics (1982)
- Honorary Worker of People's Control Committee (1982)
- Honorary Worker of Civil Aviation (1988)
- Distinguished Economist of Mongolia (2006)
- Order of the "Polar Star" of Mongolia (1971)
- Order of "Labour Valour" of Mongolia (1982)
- Medal of the “40th Anniversary of People's Revolution” of Mongolia
- Medal of the “50th Anniversary of People's Revolution” of Mongolia
- Medal of the “60th Anniversary of People's Revolution” of Mongolia
- Medal of the “100th Anniversary of V.I.Lenin” of the USSR

== Memory ==
A memorial stand dedicated to Ts. Molom is located in the museum of Davst Soum, Uvs Aimag.

The Ministry of Finance of Mongolia displays his portrait in its honorary gallery.

== Literature ==
Ts. Molom is an author of textbooks on accounting, economics and finance.

- Ts., Molom (1982). Ардын хянан шалгагчийн лавлах. Ulaanbaatar: State Publishing House.
- Ts., Molom; U., Gankhuyag (1982). БНМАУ-ын төсөв. Ulaanbaatar: State Publishing House.
- Ts., Molom; D., Boldbaatar (2000). Даатгал. Ulaanbaatar: Mongol InterPress.

Preceded by Dumaagiin Sodnom	Minister of Finance; 7 January 1969 – 19 June 1979	Succeeded by Erdeniin Byambajav
