= Rinchingiin Elbegdorj =

Mongolian nationalist revolutionary

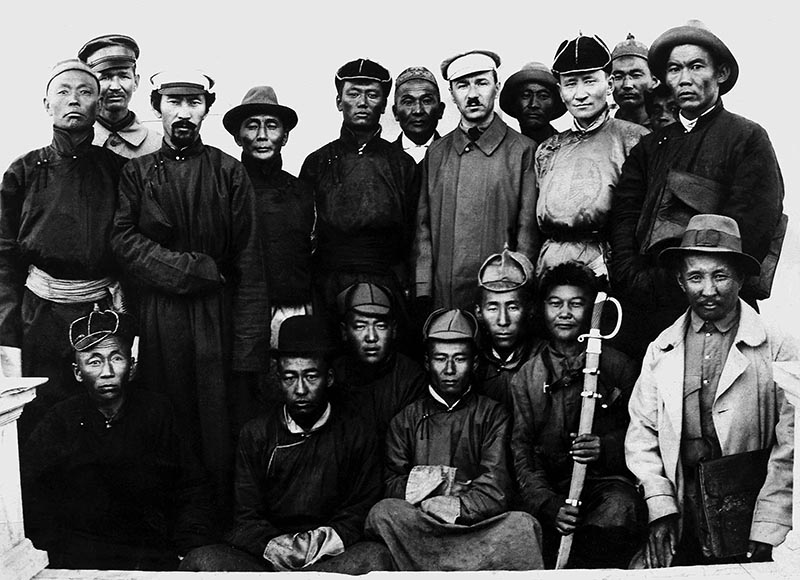
Elbegdorj, back row third from left, next to Soliin Danzan, Damdin Sükhbaatar, Ajvaagiin Danzan, Boris Shumyatsky, ?, and Dogsomyn Bodoo

Rinchinei Elbegdorzho (Buryat: Ринчинэй Элбэгдоржо; Russian: Элбек-Доржи Ринчино; 16 May 1888 – 10 June 1938) was a Buryat nationalist revolutionary who played leading roles in the Mongolian Revolution of 1921 and the early political development of the Mongolian People's Republic. He was an important member of the Mongolian People's Revolutionary Party representing the Buryats and served as Chairman of the Revolutionary War Council of the Mongolian People's Army.

== Early life and career ==
Elbegdorj was born on 16 May 1888 into a herding family in Barguzinsky District, Transbaikal. He became a communist around 1910 while studying law at Saint Petersburg State University. He then moved to Troitskosavsk where he wrote for a local newspaper and traveled throughout Mongolia, becoming involved in clandestine Mongolian revolutionary activities. Elbegdorj befriended a young Khorloogiin Choibalsan in Irkutsk between 1914 and 1918 and became a strong early influence on future Mongolian leader.

During his time in Buryatia, Elbegdorj was inspired by the moderate (advocating for greater rights for Buryats within the Russian Empire but not independence) Buryat politician Batu-Dalai Ochirov, whom Rinchino wrote an obituary about. Soon after the beginning of the Russian Civil War, Elbegdorj moved his activities to Outer Mongolia. In 1918, Elbegdorj, along with Cossack leader Grigory Semyonov and twelve of Elbegdorj's Russian-educated friends met in Chita, where they decreed that they had made a new pan-Mongol state with support from Japan. Initially hoping they would take this decree to the Paris Peace Conference, their hopes were dashed after the Japanese withdrew their support. Half of the people involved in this decree were invited to a "banquet" by a warlord in Manchuria, who had them executed on the spot.

== Revolution of 1921 ==
By 1920, Elbegdorj's connection to Mongolian revolutionary groups and his expertise on Mongolian affairs made him an indispensable part of Soviet efforts to steer Mongolia's early revolutionary development. Along with Tsyben Zhamtsarano, another Buryat nationalist who had studied in St. Petersburg University, Elbegdorj turned to the Russian Communists to try to gain favor for the Buryats. When the Russian Politburo published a decree guaranteeing Buryat autonomy from Russia, Elbegdorj stressed it as something with "great significance to Mongolia". In 1920 he organized the first meetings between Mongolian revolutionaries and members of the Revolutionary Military Committee of the Fifth Red Army and acted as the group's Russian interpreter. He also accompanied delegates Soliin Danzan and Dambyn Chagdarjav to Moscow where they met Russian communist leader Nikolay Bukharin. He was also a guiding presence at the first secret meeting of the Mongolian People's Party held in Troitskosavsk from 1921 March 1 to 3 (later known as the First Party Congress of the MPRP), where the provisional revolutionary government of Mongolia was established. When meeting Y. D. Yanson, head of the Siberian branch of the Soviet Ministry of Foreign Affairs, Elbegdorj proposed the establishment of a group dealing with Mongolian affairs within the Russian Communist Party. This plan came to fruition with the creation of the Asian Bureau (Aziatskoe Biuro) in Irkutsk in spring 1920. In 1921, Elbegdorj worked as the secretary of the Mongol-Tibetan department of the Far-Eastern department of the Comintern.

Following the Mongolian Revolution of 1921, Elbegdorj was appointed head of the Mongolian army training and education department. He returned to Mongolia in 1922. Along with Choibalsan, he established the radicalized Mongolian Revolutionary Youth League (MRYL), through which he exerted a strong influence on the political orientation of Mongolian revolutionary policy in its early years. By this time he was recognized as one of the leading figures of Mongolia's revolutionary government and with the backing he enjoyed from Moscow, he came to dominate the political scene in Ulan Bator, often emerging as victor from party infighting. In 1922 he successfully collaborated with Soliin Danzan and Damdin Sükhbaatar to eliminate Prime Minister Dogsomyn Bodoo in a power struggle.

== Third Party Congress of 1924 ==
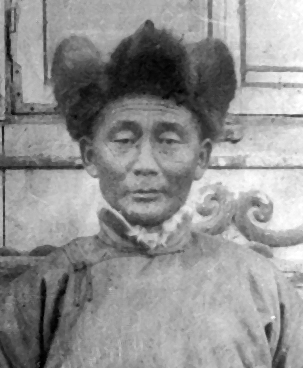
Soliin Danzan

After the purge of Bodoo, a rivalry developed between Elbegdorj and Danzan that came to a head at the Third Party Congress in 1924. Danzan had angered Elbegdorj and the Comintern when he sought to reduce the number of Soviet advisers in Mongolia, attempted to bring the radicalized Mongolian Revolutionary Youth League (MRYL) under party control, and resisted Soviet advice that Mongolia bypass capitalism and move directly to socialism. Recognized as leader of the party's leftist faction, Elbegdorj joined with rightists under Tseren-Ochiryn Dambadorj to orchestrate Danzan's the arrest and execution. At the Third Party Congress Danzan was Officially accused of representing bourgeois interests and engaging in business with Chinese firms. Within a day Danzan and several colleagues were arrested and executed, sending a shock wave through the party that solidified Soviet dominance of Mongolian politics.

In the wake of the Third Party Congress, Rightists under Dambadorj assumed control and, during a period later referred to as the “Right Opportunism” (1925-1928), promoted rightist policies mirroring Lenin’s New Economic Policy in the Soviet Union. Elbegdorj helped draft the country's 1924 Constitution (based largely on the Soviet constitution), but soon thereafter saw his influence wane with the appointment of Turar Ryskulov as the new chief Comintern adviser in Ulaanbaatar in 1924.

During the Congress, when Elbegdorj was criticized for working for the Russians, he responded with the statement that "I have worked from the beginning of the existence of our People's Party. I went with the representatives of our Party to Moscow. I worked in the Far Eastern Secretariat of the Comintern (Mongolian and Tibetan Section) at Irkutsk. I led Mongolia to the Comintern, which supplied the Mongolian People's Party with instructors and indispensable funds. Later the Comintern dispatched me to Kiakhta for work during the most critical moment of the existence of our Party and Government… The Comintern has dispatched me here."

During the Third Party Congress, Elbegdorj stated his opinions on the expansion of Mongolia, stating that "millions of our race, the 'Inner' Mongols, are groaning under the oppression of China" (referring to Inner Mongolia), and during the First Great Khural of November 1924, he stated that "We must be the cultural center for our races, we must attract to ourselves the Inner Mongols, Barga Mongols, etc..." Baradin told this same Khural: 'Be firm in your work of uniting all Mongolian races...'" In the same year, Elbegdorj noted that he speculated that upon the full conversion of Mongolia to Communism, Mongolia should annex Buryatia and then focus on conquering Tibet, creating a Buddhist Mongol-Tibetan state. Facing criticism from the Russians that such a state would be too powerful, Elbegdorj replied that nevertheless, "In our hands, the all-Mongol national idea could be a powerful and sharp revolutionary weapon. Under no circumstances are we going to surrender this weapon into the hands of Mongol feudal lords, Japanese militarists, and Russian bandits like Baron Ungern."

== Death ==
By 1925, Elbegdorj was accused of being a bourgeois nationalist and a Pan-Mongolist whose pan-Mongolian sentiments, expressed at the Third Party Congress in 1924, were seen as contrary to communist policy. The power struggle between Ryskulov and Elbegdorj eventually resulted in both being recalled to Moscow in 1928. He then worked at NIANKP (Scientific-Investigative Association for National and Colonial Problems) and taught at the Communist University of the Toilers of the East training many of the young MPRP members who attended the school. Elbegdorj was arrested in 1937 during the Great Purge, sentenced to death by the Military Collegium of the Soviet Supreme Court on 4 June 4 1938, and executed on 10 June 1938 in Moscow.

He was rehabilitated in 1957.

== See also ==
- Buryat nationalism
