= Dambyn Chagdarjav =

Mongolian revolutionary (1880–1922)

- Дамбын Чагдаржав
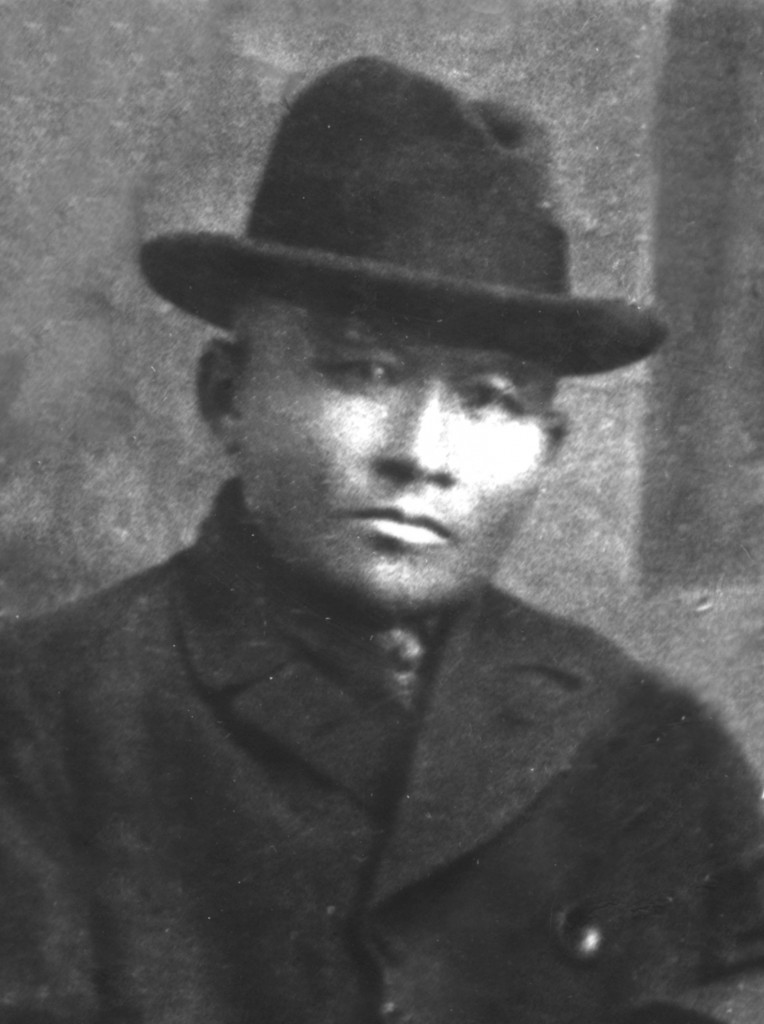
- Chagdarjav in the 1920s

4th Prime Minister of Mongolia
- In office March 13, 1921 – April 16, 1921
- Preceded by: Gonchigjalzangiin Badamdorj
- Succeeded by: Dogsomyn Bodoo

Personal details
- Born: 1880 Selenge Province, Mongolia, Qing China
- Died: August 31, 1922 (aged 41–42) Niislel Khüree

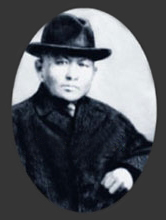
Dambyn Chagdarjav.

Dambyn Chagdarjav (Mongolian: Дамбын Чагдаржав; 1880 – August 31, 1922) was a Mongolian revolutionary and one of the “first seven” founders of the Mongolian People's Party (MPP) in 1920. He was named prime minister of Mongolia's provisional government at the first MPP Congress in March 1921 but was subsequently replaced by Dogsomyn Bodoo after just a month in office. In the spring of 1922 a power struggle led to his being accused of conspiring to overthrow the revolutionary government. He was arrested and executed along with prime minister Bodoo on August 31, 1922.

== Early life and career ==
Chagdarjav was born in 1880 in present-day Selenge Province.

In 1919 Chagdarjav joined the secret revolutionary group Konsulyn Denj (Consulate Hill) in Khüree (present-day Ulaanbaatar). Together with Dogsomyn Bodoo, Khorloogiin Choibalsan, and Darizavyn Losol he formed the basic nucleus of the group which joined with Damdin Sükhbaatar's Züün Hüree organization in June 1920 to form the Mongolian People's Party (MPP).

Chagdrajav was one of seven revolutionaries (the famous "First Seven") chosen to travel to the USSR in June 1920 to establish contact with the Soviets. Other delegates included Soliin Danzan, Dansrabilegiin Dogsom, Damdin Sükhbaatar, Khorloogiin Choibalsan, Dogsomyn Bodoo and Darizavyn Losol. Chagdrajav and Danzan traveled together to Moscow where they met with Vladimir Lenin.

== Head of Provisional Government ==
Chagdarjav was appointed prime minister of the provisional revolutionary government established at a secret MPP meeting in the Russian-Mongolian border town of Troitskosavsk from March 1–3, 1921 (later known as the First Party Congress of the MPRP). However, just over a month later, on April 16, 1921, he was relieved of his duties and dispatched as the party's representative to Urianhay (Tuva). Bodoo then took over as both Prime Minister and Foreign Minister.

== Death ==
Soon after the victory of the Outer Mongolian Revolution of 1921, strife erupted within the party as various factions jockeyed for power, particularly between Soliin Danzan and Prime Minister Dogsomyn Bodoo. In 1922, Danzan accused Bodoo, Chagdarjav and others of plotting with the charismatic independence leader Ja Lama as well as with the Chinese and Americans, to undermine the revolution and establish an autocratic government. Despite Bodoo's resignation from government on January 7, 1922, Danzan nevertheless pursued the charges. Chagdarjav, Bodoo, Da Lama, Puntsagdorj and other former ministers were arrested and interrogated by a Russian agent. Chagdarjav and Bodoo were executed on August 31, 1922. The deaths of Chagdarjav and Bodoo are generally viewed as the first in a series of political purges that would take place in Mongolia through the 1920s and 1930s.

Political offices
Preceded by Gonchigjalzangiin Badamdorj	Prime Minister of Mongolia; March 13, 1921 - April 16, 1921	Succeeded by Dogsomyn Bodoo
