= Davst, Uvs =

District in Uvs Province, Mongolia

Coordinates: 50°36′46″N 92°24′08″E

Davst District Давст сум ᠳᠠᠪᠤᠰᠤᠲᠤᠰᠤᠮᠤ
- District
- Interactive map of Davst District
- Country: Mongolia
- Province: Uvs Province
- Time zone: UTC+7 (UTC + 7)

Davst (Mongolian: Давст, salty) is a sum (district) of Uvs Province in western Mongolia, bordering Russia in the north.

The reason it is called "salty" is that there is the biggest natural salt rock deposit in the country. The sum occupies the northern tip of Uvs Nuur which is 5 times saltier than the ocean.

== Geography ==
Davst is the northern most district in Uvs Province. A border crossing to Khandagayty, Russia is located in the sum.

== Administrative divisions ==
The district is divided into three bags, which are:

- Khandgait
- Torkhilog
- Zuunkhuvuu

== Notable natives ==
- Molom Tsend, economist and politician
