= Dansranbilegiin Dogsom =

Mongolian politician (1884–1941)

- Дансранбилэгийн Догсом
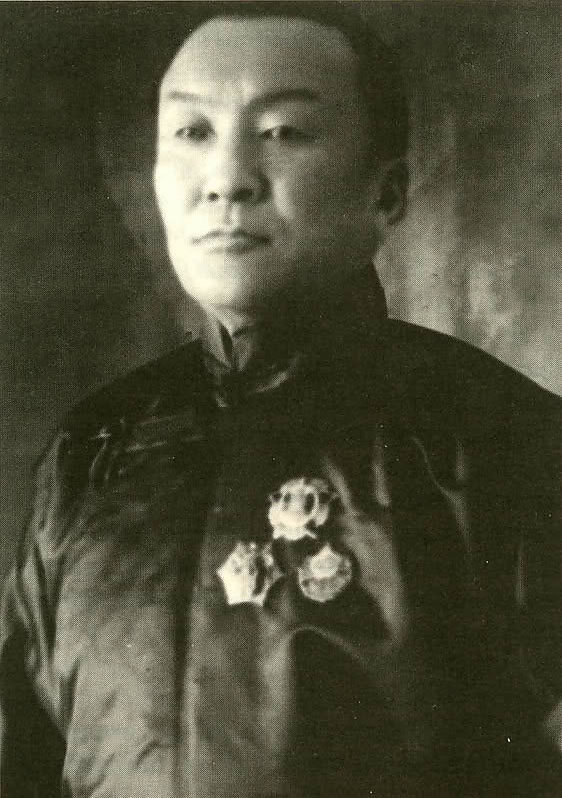

7th Chairman of the Presidium of the State Little Khural
- In office 22 March 1936 – 9 July 1939
- Preceded by: Anandyn Amar
- Succeeded by: Gonchigiin Bumtsend

Personal details
- Born: 1884 Dalai van khoshuu, Setsen khan aimag (Bayan-Ovoo sum, Khentii), Mongolia, Qing China
- Died: July 27, 1941 (aged 56–57) Moscow, Russian Soviet Federative Socialist Republic, Soviet Union
- Party: Mongolian People's Revolutionary Party (1920–1939)

Dansranbilegiin Dogsom (Mongolian: Дансранбилэгийн Догсом; 1884 – July 27, 1941) was a prominent Mongolian revolutionary leader and post-Revolution political figure in Mongolian People's Republic. He served as Chairman of the Presidium of the State Little Khural (titular head of state) of the Mongolian People's Republic from 1936 until he was purged in 1939.

== Early life and career ==
Dogsom was born in 1884 in present-day Bayan-Ovoo district of Khentii Province. Literate at an early age, he first worked as a scribe in his district and provincial assemblies, and then at the ministry of finance during the Bogd Khaanate. In 1915 he participated as a scribe in negotiations that led to the Treaty of Kyakhta.

=== Outer Mongolian revolution of 1921 ===
In 1919 Dogsom joined the revolutionary resistance group Züün Khüree (East Khüree), which counted Soliin Danzan and Damdin Sükhbaatar among its members. On June 25, 1920, Züün Khüree merged with the Konsulyn Denj group (Dambyn Chagdarjav, Darizavyn Losol, Khorloogiin Choibalsan, and Dogsomyn Bodoo) to become the Mongolian People’s Party (MPP), later renamed the Mongolian People's Revolutionary Party (MPRP) in 1924. He was one of seven original revolutionaries, "the first seven", to travel to the Soviet Russia in 1920 to establish first contacts with the Bolsheviks and seek assistance with their revolutionary struggle. In advance of the revolution, Dogsom and Bodoo returned to Khüree, where they worked to enlarge the party's membership and form an army.

After the Outer Mongolian Revolution of 1921 Dogsom held a series of positions within the revolutionary government including in the Ministry of Internal Affairs, the Ministry of War, the MPP Central Committee, and the Economic Council. He was a counselor in the border districts of Khovd Province (1924–1926), First Secretary at the Mongolian Embassy in Moscow (1926–1927), again counselor at Altanbulag (1928–1929), Director of the Revolutionary Museum and Mayor of Ulaanbaatar from 1930 to 1932, and then Mongolia's representative to Tuvan People's Republic from 1933 to 1934. In February–March 1936, Dogsom was elected to the Presidium (or Politburo) of the MPRP Central Committee and concurrently as Chairman of the Little Khural, making him titular head of state.

== Purge ==
Shortly after becoming chairman of the Presidium of the Little Khural in 1936, Dogsom and Prime Minister Anandyn Amar aggravated Interior Minister Choibalsan and Moscow alike when they pardoned prisoners implicated in the Lkhümbe spy ring case in honor of the fifteenth anniversary of the revolution. Dogsom's enemies, particularly Choibalsan, used the event to connect him to the fictitious spy ring and accuse him of being in league with Japanese imperialists. In July 1939 as the Stalinist repressions in Mongolia drew to a close, Choibalsan arranged the arrest of Dogsom and Darizavyn Losol on charges of counterrevolution. Besides Choibalsan himself, the two were the last remaining members of the original "First Seven" founders of the MPP. He was sent to Moscow and tried on July 8, 1941, under Soviet authorities. He was executed on July 27 of the same year.

Dogsom was posthumously rehabilitated and reinstated as a party member according to a proclamation of the Rehabilitation Commission made on January 25, 1967.

== Notes ==
Preceded by Anandyn Amar	Head of state of Mongolia; March 22, 1936 – July 9, 1939	Succeeded by Gonchigiin Bumtsend
