= Nadmidyn Bayartsaikhan =

Mongolian economist and government minister

- Born: January 27, 1962; Ulaanbaatar, Mongolia
- Occupations: Government minister; Social scientist; Bank president; Teacher

Nadmidyn Bayartsaikhan (born January 27, 1962) is a Mongolian social scientist, politician, and government minister. After teaching social science, he obtained a doctorate in economics and was elected to the State Great Khural four times. He also served as the Mongolian Minister of Finance from 2006 to 2007. After leaving politics, Bayartsaikhan became the President of the Bank of Mongolia, holding that position from 2016 to 2019.

== Early life and education ==
Bayartsaikhan was born on 27 January 1962, in Ulaanbaatar. He attended the Irkutsk University of Economics, graduating in 1982. He then taught social sciences at the Higher Party School until 1989. From 1989 to 1992, he studied economics at the State University of Management in Moscow, Russia. There he obtained a doctorate degree in economics.

== Career ==
In 1992, Bayartsaikhan was elected to represent the Khan Uul District of the Uvs-Aimak Province in the State Great Khural. In November 1993 he was elected to the Mongolian People's Party Leadership Council, a position that he held until 2001. He was re-elected to the Great Khural in the elections of 1996, 2000, and 2004. From 1992 to 1995, Bayartsaikhan chaired the parliamentary Standing Committee on Food and Agriculture. Bayartsaikhan was not re-elected in the 2008 Mongolian legislative election.

Bayartsaikhan served as the Minister of Trade for Mongolia from 2006 to 2007. This position involved chairing the parliamentary standing committee on the budget. As trade minister, he was involved in managing the continuation of Official development assistance from Japan to Mongolia. His tenure as Trade Minister also included energy negotiations with Russia.

In July 2016, Bayartsaikhan was named Governor of the Bank of Mongolia. He held that position until 2019. During his tenure at the central bank, the first e-money license was issued in 2018.

In 2017, Bayartsaikhan was accused of arranging financing for a company he owned through Mongolia's Small and Medium Enterprises Development Fund. It was later determined that the accusation had arisen from an error in his official income and asset declaration, in which he had incorrectly listed the name of a company in which he held shares. One of the reasons Bayartsaikhan was criticised was the addition of Mongolia to the Financial Action Task Force's (FATF) grey list in October 2019.
