= Baikal State University =

Russian university in Siberia

Coordinates: 52.2806°N 104.2828°E

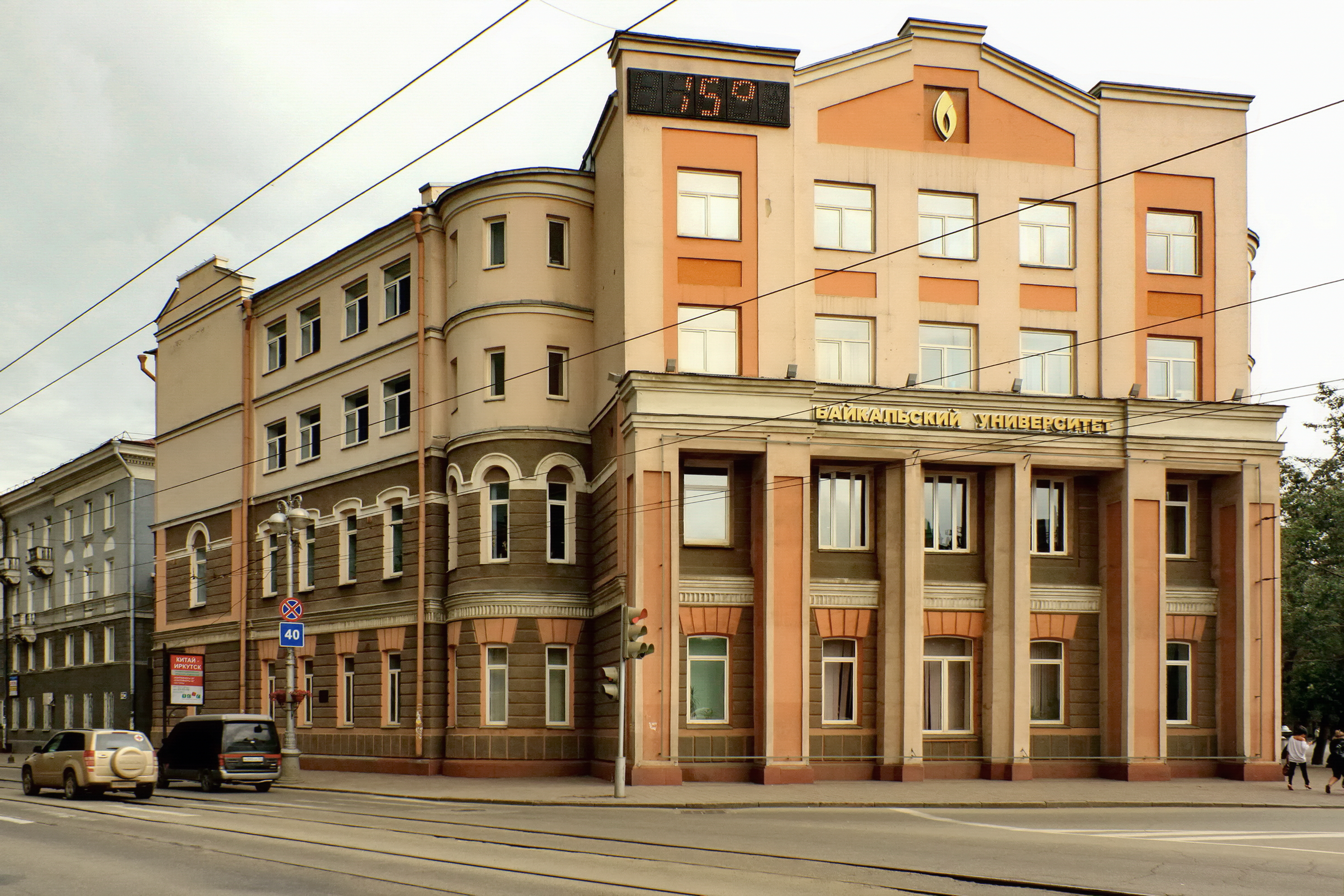
Main building

Baikal State University (BSU), also known as Baikal National University of Economics and Law, is a Russian state university in Siberia. It was founded in 1930.

== Description ==
BSU provides under-graduate, graduate, post-graduate and advanced education in Economics, Management, Law, Applied Computer Science in Economics, Journalism, Psychology and Sociology. BSU includes the Institute of Commerce in Irkutsk, branches in Chita, Ust-Ilimsk, and Bratsk,; College of Business and Law, College of Trade and Economy, Post-Graduate and Post Doctoral Courses in 17 areas.

== New Building ==
BUS has 11 buildings, high-rise dorms, a health maintenance facility for 50 visitors, recreation centre on the bank of the Angara River, sport and cultural centers (including a cinema), a number of cafeterias and cafes.

Research projects are done on request of Rosobrazovanie of the Russian Federation, the Russian Foundation for Basic Research, the Russian State Scientific Foundation, International Foundations, Irkutsk Oblast and Chita Oblast governments and regional municipalities.
