= Deel (clothing) =

Traditional Mongolian robe

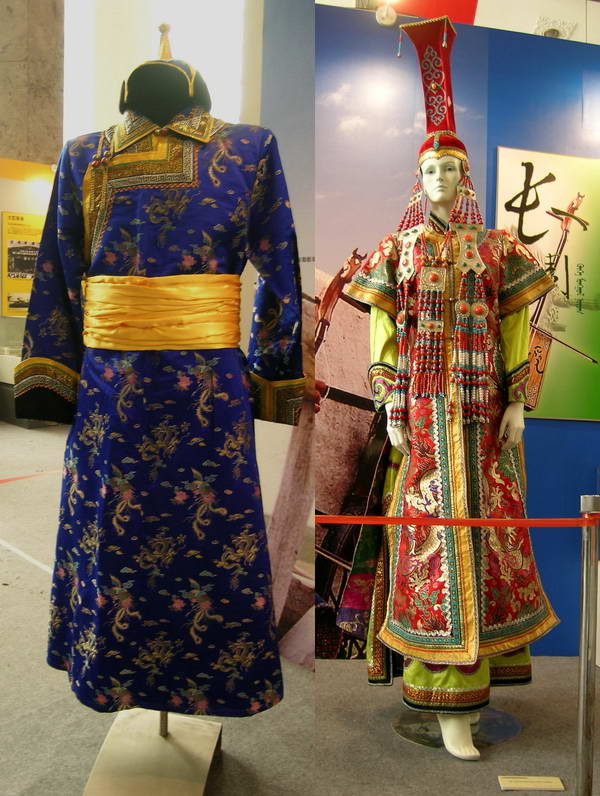
Mongolian deel for a man (left) and a woman (right). This type is especially used by Bayads, one of the Tribes of Mongolia.

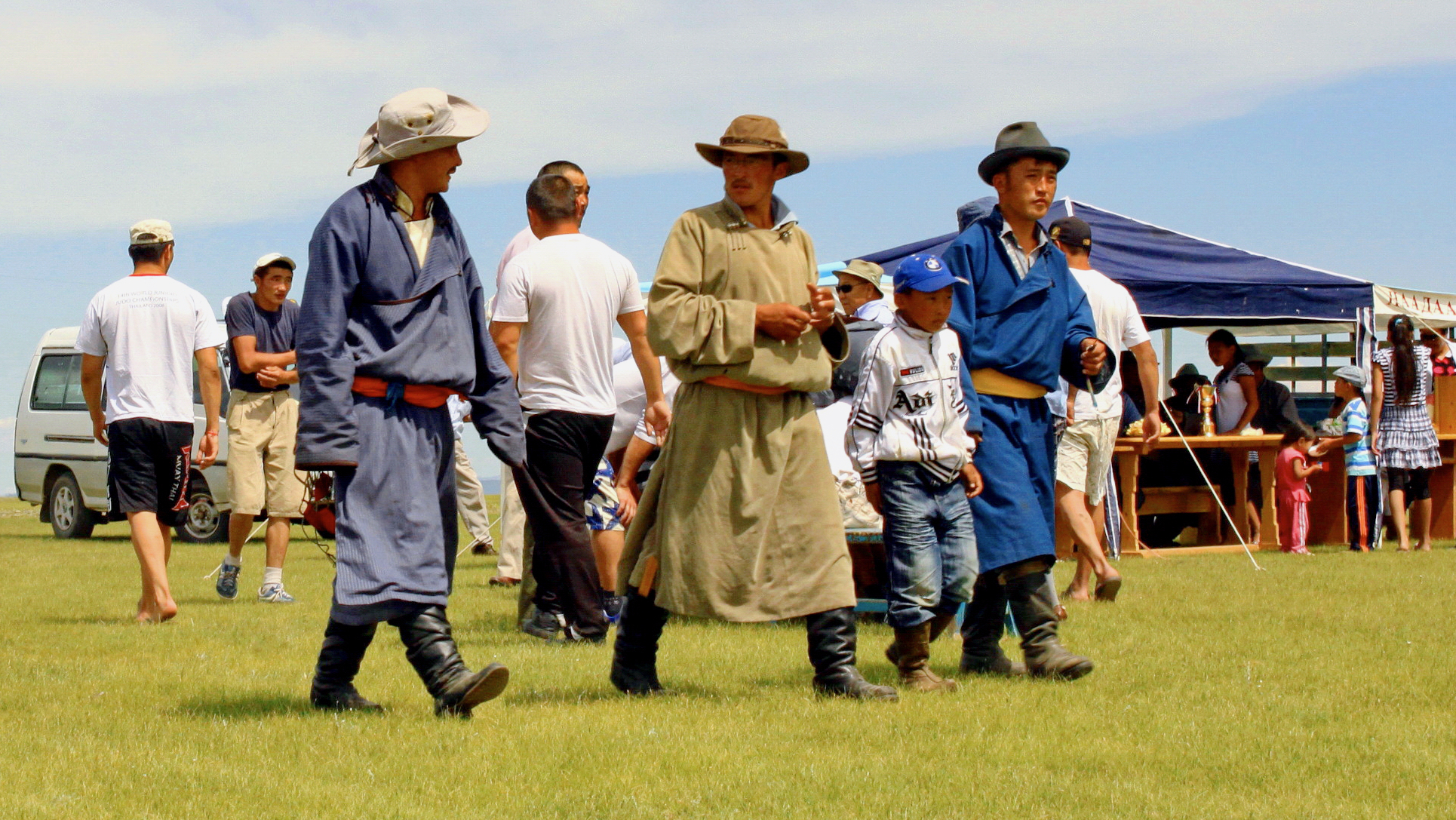
Men in traditional Mongolian costumes (deel) before starting of a local Naadam festival in Kharkhorin

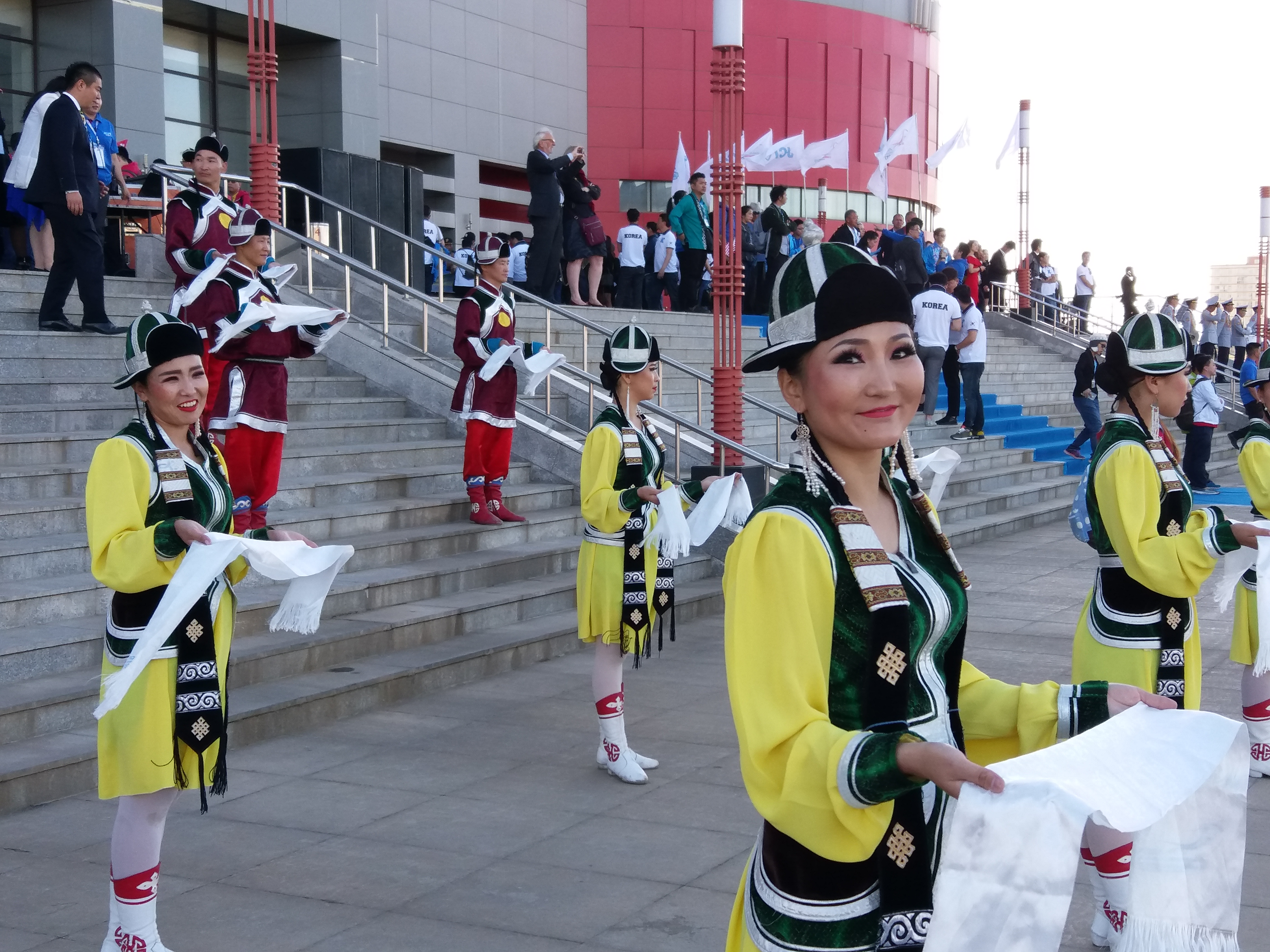
National costume

A deel (Mongolian: ᠳᠡᠪᠡᠯ /дээл [deːɮ]; Buryat: дэгэл [dɛɡɛɮ]) is an item of traditional clothing commonly worn by Mongols and can be made from cotton, silk, wool, or brocade.

The deel is still commonly worn by both men and women outside major towns, especially by herders. In urban areas, the deel is mostly only worn by elderly people, or on festive occasions. The deel appears similar to a caftan or an old European folded tunic. Deels typically reach to below the wearer's knees and fan out at the bottom. They come in a variety of colors but are most commonly blue, olive, or burgundy.

== Description ==
The deel looks like a large overcoat when not worn. Instead of buttoning together in the middle, the sides are pulled against the wearer's body, the right flap close to the body with the left covering. On the right side of the wearer are typically 5 or 6 clasps to hold the top flap in place. There is one clasp below the armpit, three at the shoulder, and either one or two at the neckline.

A deel is traditionally worn with a large sash, usually made of silk or leather belts with large, ornate buckles have become more common in the modern era. The area between the flaps and above the belt creates a large pocket in which the wearer can store objects; Mongolian men will occasionally even carry a silver bowl or cup, or even a snuff box in their deel. Though there is no major difference in material or outline between male and female deels, women tend to wear the "pocket" closer (that is, women often prefer a more snug-fitting deel), while men's may have larger pockets, a looser fit, and wider sleeves.

In Mongolia, the usage of the word deel has been extended to cover other long winter coats as well. For example, fur and leather overcoats of Western design are referred to as nekhii deel and sawkhin deel, respectively, meaning "fur deel", "leather deel" and "cashmere deel", which is made of the luxurious material cashmere. Nevertheless, other Mongol regions, such as Bortala in Xinjiang, retain the specific meaning of the word deel as the traditional garment, and refer to other overcoats as olondoi.

== Types ==
Deel design varies to a certain degree among cultures and ethnic groups, and has varied across time periods. There are even distinct variations among different Mongol tribes, mostly on the design of the upper chest opening edges. For instance, the Khalkha Mongol deel opening edges are round, while a Buryat deel's is square. It can also vary among other tribes such as Chakhars, Torguuds, and Uzemchins. Deels are designed for different occasions, seasons, and functions. There are deels for ceremonies like weddings and holidays and deels for daily wear. Deels for special occasions have their outer layer made of silk while the common deels are usually made of wool, cotton and other relatively inexpensive materials.
