= Darizavyn Losol =

Mongolian politician (1890–1940)

Darizavyn Losol Дарьжавын Лосол
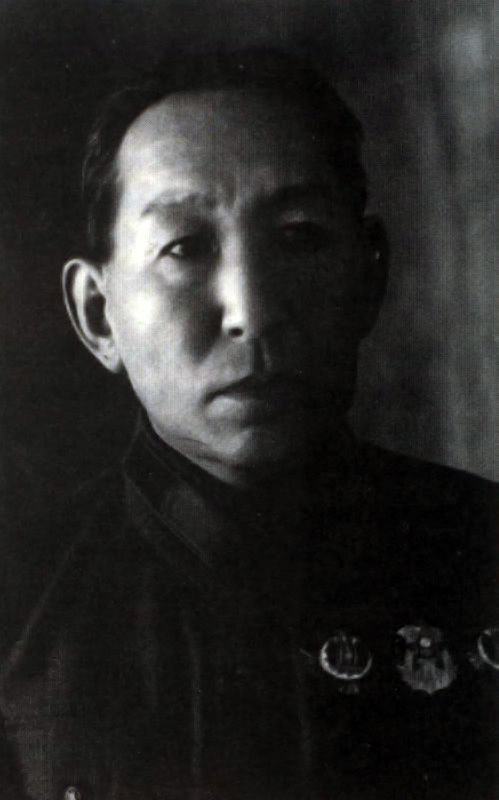

Personal details
- Born: April 15, 1890 Batnorov district, Khentii Province
- Died: July 25, 1940 (aged 50) Butyrka prison, Moscow, Soviet Union
- Resting place: Kommunarka shooting ground near Butovo
- Party: Mongolian People's Revolutionary Party (1920–1939)

Darizavyn Losol (Mongolian: Дарьжавын Лосол; April 15, 1890 – July 25, 1940) was a revolutionary leader and post-Revolution governmental figure in Mongolia until he was purged in 1939.

== Early life ==
Losol (or "Darizhavyn" or "Darijavyn") was born into a herdsman's family on April 15, 1890, in present-day Batnorov district, Khentii Province. He entered a local monastery at age nine and then moved to Khüree (present day Ulaanbaatar) three years later to pursue his education at Gandan Monastery. Between 1908 and 1911 he self-financed travel through Manchuria to Peking as well as to St. Petersburg and Moscow. Losol joined the army of Autonomous Mongolia in 1911 after the country had formally declared its independence from Chinese rule and took part in battles against Chinese forces on the south-east border in 1913.

== Outer Mongolian Revolution of 1921 ==
In 1918 Losol along with Dambyn Chagdarjav, Khorloogiin Choibalsan and Dogsomyn Bodoo founded the Konsulyn Denj (Консулын дэнж:Consular Hill) group of Mongolian revolutionaries in Khüree. The group joined forces with another resistance group in the city, Züün Khüree, to become the Mongolian People's Party (MPP) on June 25, 1920. He was one of seven MPP delegates (the famous “First Seven”) sent to the USSR to establish contact with the Soviets and seek assistance with their independence struggle against Chinese rule. At the first MPP Congress, held secretly from March 1 to 3, 1921 in Troitskosavsk, Losol was elected one of the three members of the Central Committee and was later appointed a member of the MPP Central Committee's Presidium and Minister of Finance in the provisional government.

== Political career ==
After the revolution Losol held a succession of high-ranking positions within the MPRP. From 1924 to 1925 he served as deputy member of the Presidium (Politburo) of the MPRP Central Committee responsible for making important policy decisions. He was Chairman and then president of the Party Central Control Commission from 1925 to 1939. From 1925 to 1927 and again from 1936 to 1939, he was deputy chairman of the presidium of the ‘’Baga Hural’’ (the Little Hural – the effective governing unit responsible for day to day administration). He was also a member of the board of the State Bank and member of the control commission of the Cooperatives Association from 1928 to 1937. In 1934 he co-authored the two-volume work Mongol Ardyn Undessnii Khuv'sgalyn Ankh Üüsch Baiguulsan Tovch Tüükh (Short History of the Original Birth and Establishment of the Mongolian People's National Revolution) with his close friend Khorloogiin Choibalsan and G. Demid.

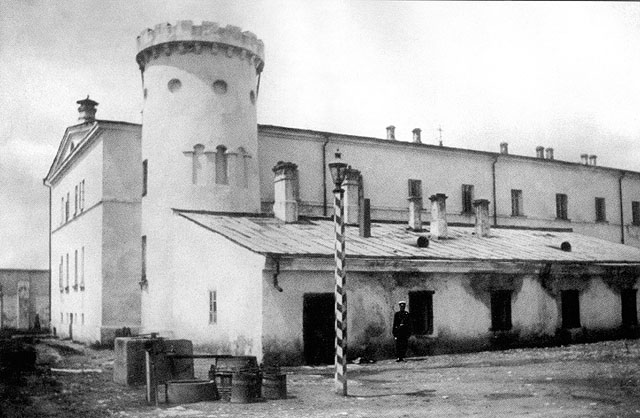
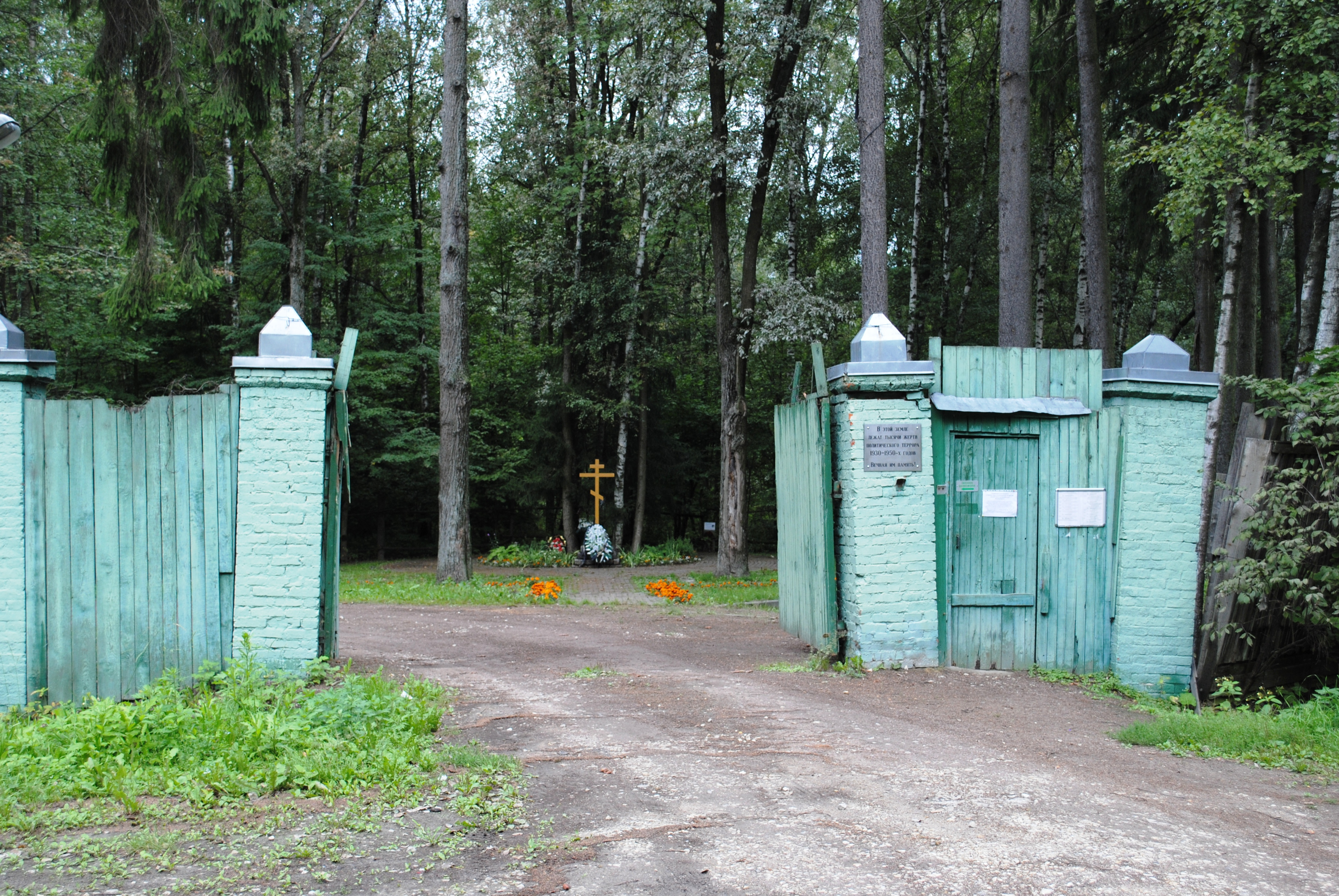
Left:Butyrka Prison, where Losol spent the last year of his life. Right: The entrance to Kommunarka Cemetery, Losol's final resting place.

== Purge ==
In July 1939 as the Stalinist repressions in Mongolia drew to a close, Choibalsan arranged the arrest of Losol and Dansranbilegiin Dogsom, who, besides Choibalsan himself, were the last remaining members of the original "First Seven" founders of the MPP, on charges of counterrevolution. Choibalsan recruited Dashiin Damba (MPRP General Secretary from 1954 to 1958), to deceive Losol into boarding a plane he believed was bound for Dornod Province in eastern Mongolia. Losol was instead flown to Moscow where he was arrested and confined at Butyrki Prison. He was stripped of his party membership and languished in prison for over a year until he died on July 25, 1940, before his case was brought to trial. He is buried at Kommunarka shooting ground near Butovo.

In 1956 the Soviet Procurator General ruled Losol had no case to answer. In 1962 Losol was officially rehabilitated and his party membership was restored 1989.

Losol’s son, the architect L. Ulziikhishig, was one of the creators of the memorial honoring Soviet soldiers at Zaisan Tolgoi.
