= Ja Lama =

Mongolian adventurer (1862–1922)

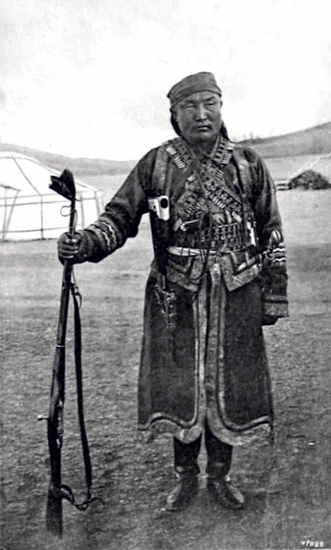
- Born: Dambiijantsan; 1862; Baga Dörbet ulus, Astrakhan, Russian Empire
- Died: (Early) 1922 (execution); Gobi Desert, border of Mongolia and Xinjiang Province, Republic of China
- Occupation: Guerrilla

Ja Lama (Mongolian: Жа Лама, also known as Dambiijantsan, Mongolian: Дамбийжанцан or Dambiijaa, Mongolian: Дамбийжаа; 1862–1922) was an adventurer and warlord of unknown birth and background who fought successive campaigns against the rule of the Qing dynasty in western Mongolia between 1890 and 1922. He claimed to be a Buddhist lama, though it is not clear whether he actually was one, as well as a grandson and later the reincarnation of Amursana, the Khoid-Oirat prince who led the last great Mongol uprising against the Qing in 1757. He was one of the commanders of Mongolian forces that liberated Khovd city from Qing control in 1912.

== Early life and career ==
Although Ja Lama claimed on numerous occasions both Russian citizenship and Kalmyk origin, his true identity is not known but it is widely accepted that his real name was Dambiijantsan and that he was born in or around 1862 in a Baga Dörbet ulus (tribe or tribal subdivision) somewhere in the Astrakhan region.

Ja Lama was described as "fanatically anti-Tsarist Russian, anti-Soviet Russian, and anti-Chinese."

It is believed that Ja Lama first arrived in Mongolia sometime in 1890. By the summer of that year, he was arrested by Qing authorities for campaigning against Qing rule. However, Ja Lama avoided imprisonment after the Russian consul in Ikh Khüree (modern Ulaanbaatar) identified him as "Amur Sanaev," a Russian citizen of Kalmyk origin from the Astrakhan province, and secured his release and expulsion to Russia.

By autumn of 1891, Ja Lama was back in Mongolia spreading anti-Manchu propaganda for which he would be twice more arrested. After each arrest, Ja Lama was deported to Russia. Where he remained after his second arrest is unclear, but in 1910 he reappeared among the Oirat Torghuts in Xinjiang.

== Mongolia's struggle for independence ==
The Mongolian Revolution of 1911 was fought by the Khalkha Mongols against Qing China. However, western Mongolia remained under Manchu control. By spring of 1912, Ja Lama returned to Mongolia; this time he made his way to Khovd in northwest Mongolia, the last Qing stronghold in the area, where a Manchu amban and soldiers were stationed at a fort.

All Qing officials were expelled from Mongolia by the independent Mongolian government under the Bogd Khan. The Amban of Uliastai chose to evacuate under Russian protection; however, the Amban of Khovd chose to stay and fight the Mongol rebels with his troops. The Mongol envoy sent to deliver the message to Khovd was executed by the Amban, then the Mongols prepared to attack Khovd, with 2000 soldiers contributed by Ja Lama to the Mongol forces. In 1912 at Khovd, Ja Lama helped defeat the Manchus and ransack their fort.

Ja Lama let it be known everywhere that he was going to free the Mongols from the rule of Qing dynasty. The Mongols noted that Ja Lama possessed a cap to which a golden Kalacakran vajra was affixed, instead of a button as common among Mongols. He quickly mobilized his own force and joined the 5,000 Mongols from the Khovd Province. This combined force was led by Ja Lama, the Generals Khatanbaatar Magsarjav and Manlaibaatar Damdinsüren, and the Jalkhanz Khutagt Sodnomyn Damdinbazar. Together, the Mongol fighters liberated the town of Uliastai, the town of Ulaangom in May, and Khovd in August, declaring their unity with the newly founded Mongolian state. Khovd was the final city under Manchu-Chinese (Qing) control to be seized by the Mongols.

The Manchu soldiers made an attempt to flee west and evacuate Khovd but they were massacred by the Mongols after being caught.

Orientalist Owen Lattimore described as "a strange, romantic and sometimes savage figure" the Mongol Sandagdorjiyn Magsarjav (1877-1927). Magsarjav had served under anti-communist Russian General Roman von Ungern-Sternberg, known as "the Bloody Baron" for his brutal treatment of his enemies. In Uriankhai, captured Kazakh bandits had their hearts cut out and were sacrificed by Magsarjav. It was rumored that he tore out the hearts of prisoners with his left hand and placed them in skull bowls, together with bits of the brain and entrails, as offerings to wrathful Buddhist deities. He then allegedly hung the peeled skins of his Kazakh enemies on the walls of his yurt.

== Fall from grace ==
I am a mendicant monk from the Russian Tsar's kingdom, but I am born of the great Mongols. My herds are on the Volga river, my water source is the Irtysh. There are many hero warriors with me. I have many riches. Now I have come to meet with you beggars, you remnants of the Oirats, in the time when the war for power begins. Will you support the enemy? My homeland is Altai, Irtysh, Khobuk-sari, Emil, Bortala, Ili, and Alatai. This is the Oirat mother country. By descent, I am the great-grandson of Amursana, the reincarnation of Mahakala, owning the horse Maralbashi. I am he whom they call the hero Dambijantsan. I came to move my pastures back to my own land, to collect my subject households and bondservants, to give favour, and to move freely.

— An epic poem by Ja Lama in 1912

For his role in a number of noteworthy military victories, Ja Lama was given the high religious and noble titles of Nom-un Khan Khutukhtu and khoshuu prince Tüshe Gün, respectively, by the Eighth Jebtsundamba Khutukhtu. Moreover, the victories sealed Ja Lama's reputation as a warlord and as a militant Buddhist monk. He installed himself as the military governor of western Mongolia, tyrannizing a huge territory through a reign of fear and violence.

A separatist state for Oirats was being built by Ja-Lama around Kobdo. Ja-Lama and fellow Oirats from Altai wanted to emulate the original Oirat empire and build another grand united Oirat nation from the nomads of western China and Mongolia. Prophecies had been circulating about the return of Amursana and the revival of the Oirats in the Altai region.

In February 1914, Ja Lama was arrested by Siberian Cossacks on the orders of Russian consular officials in Khovd. The consulate had received numerous complaints from nobles in the Khovd region who disapproved of Ja Lama's autocratic behavior and despotic practices. Ja Lama was imprisoned in Tomsk for about a year and later moved to Irkutsk. In 1916, Ja Lama returned to his native Lower Volga region then reentered Mongolia in the summer of 1918. Ja Lama refused to recognize the authority of the Bogd Khan and the government immediately issued a warrant for his arrest. Ja Lama, however, managed to evade Mongolian authorities, and established himself in a retreat in the Black Gobi, on the border between Mongolia and the Chinese provinces of Xinjiang and Gansu. From there, he recruited followers and extorted or robbed passing caravans. Ja Lama gained a lucrative amount of gold and silver after looting a Tibetan caravan of fifty merchants.

In the Zasagt Khan aimag opium was cultivated by Chinese workers who were employed by Ja Lama in 1918.

Ja-lama murdered all the members of a delegation sent by Baron Roman von Ungern-Sternberg to Lhasa in 1920. Ja-lama was apparently found to be a disillusionment by Ungern who had been an admirer, only to allude to him by insults after actually entering Mongolia.

== Death ==
After the re-establishment of Mongolia's independence in 1921, Ja Lama continued to operate independently from his hideout. The new communist government was intent on stamping out insurrections and set its sights on Ja Lama and his forces. In early 1922, Mongolia's military leader Damdin Sükhbaatar ordered Ja Lama's arrest. Niislel Khüree's police chief Baldandorj was dispatched to arrest him. Baldandorj succeeded in infiltrating his camp by posing as an envoy from the Bogd Khan and shot him dead, then beheaded him. Ja Lama's forces scattered and his head was displayed first in Uliastai and then Niislel Khüree. Later, Ja Lama's head was brought to Saint Petersburg and put on display at Kunstkammer of the Hermitage, labelled "No. 3394, head of a Mongolian".
