= List of prime ministers of Mongolia =

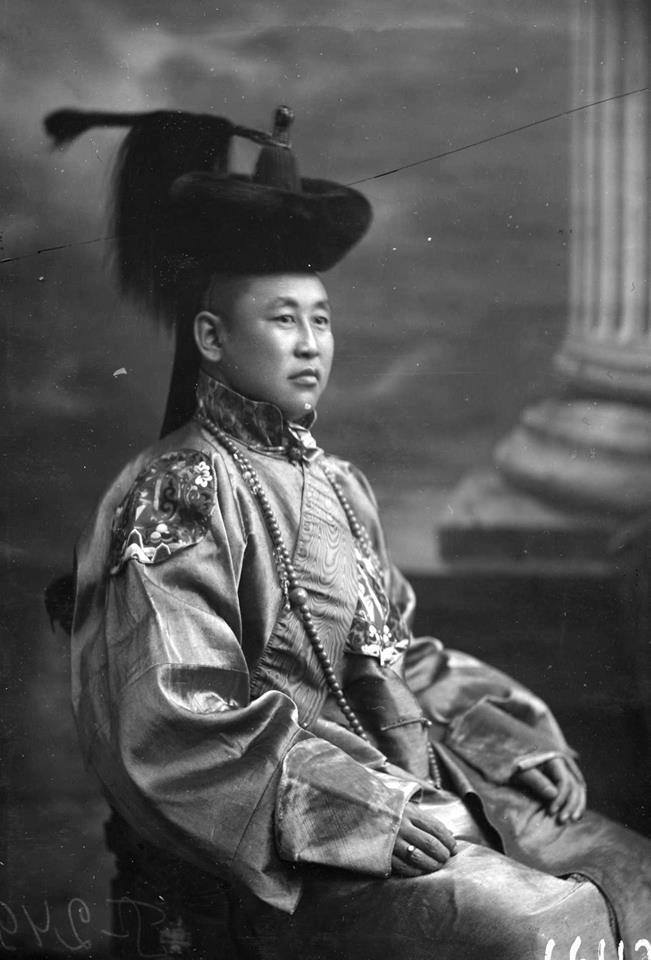
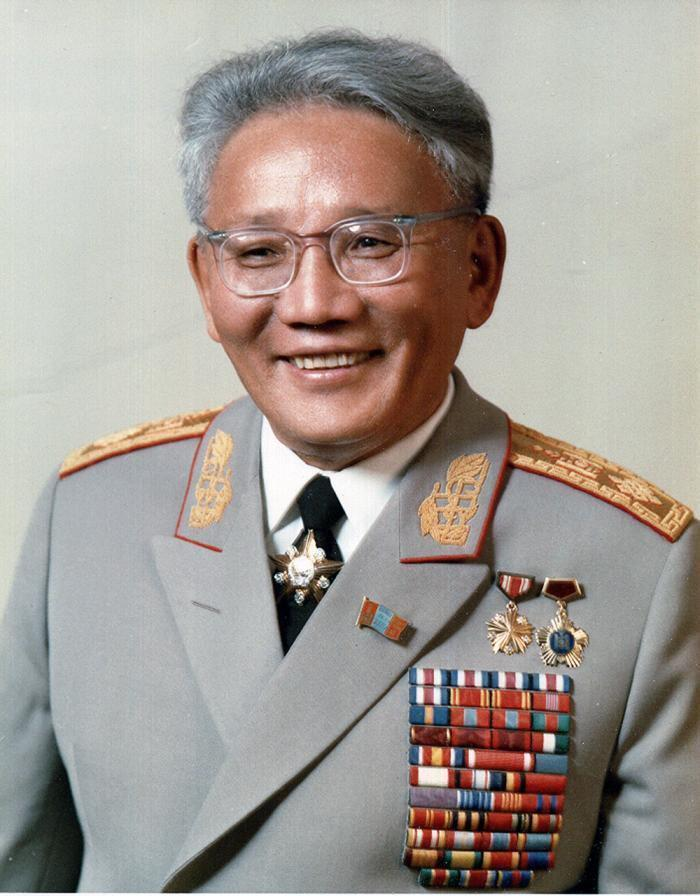
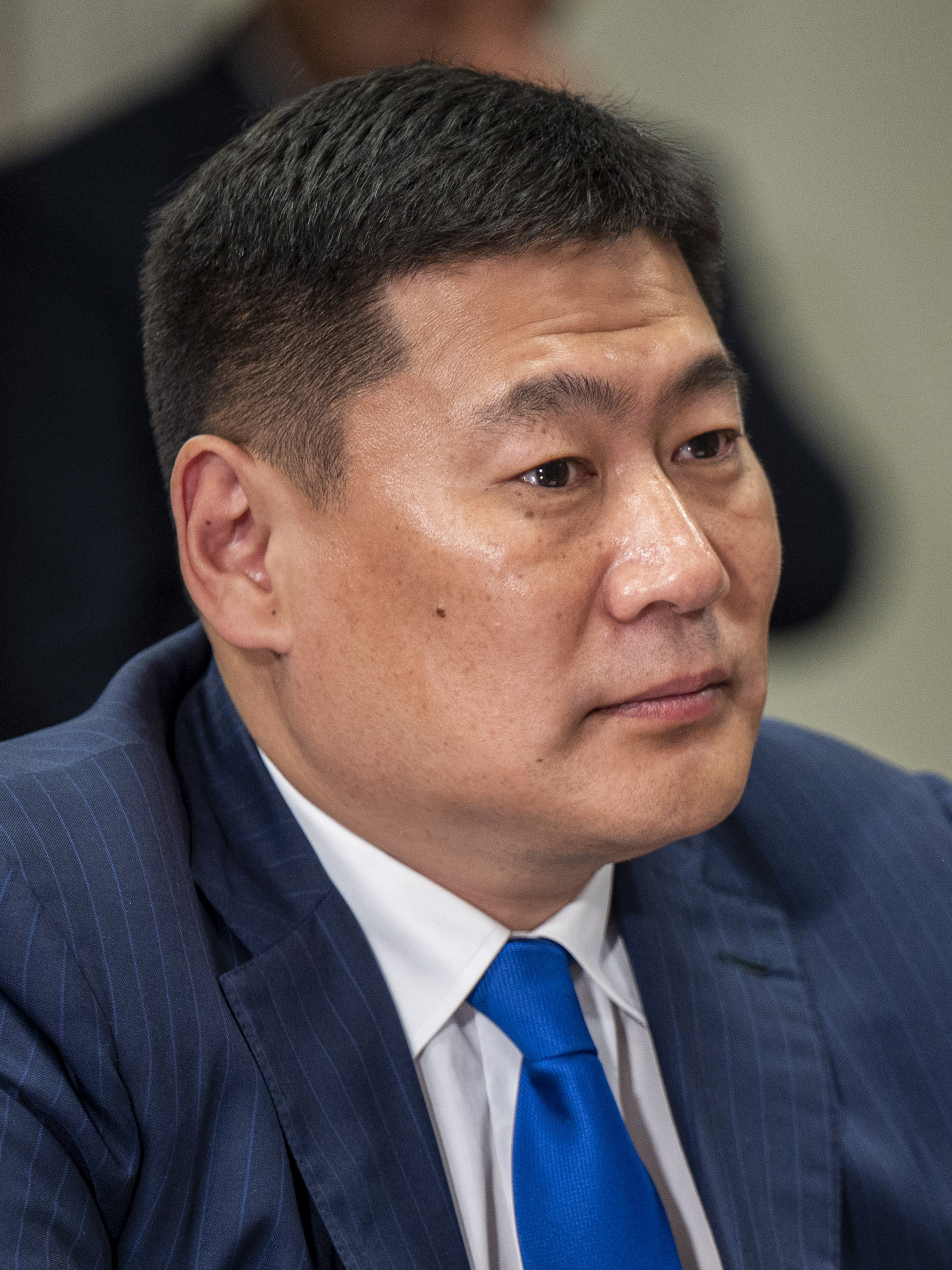
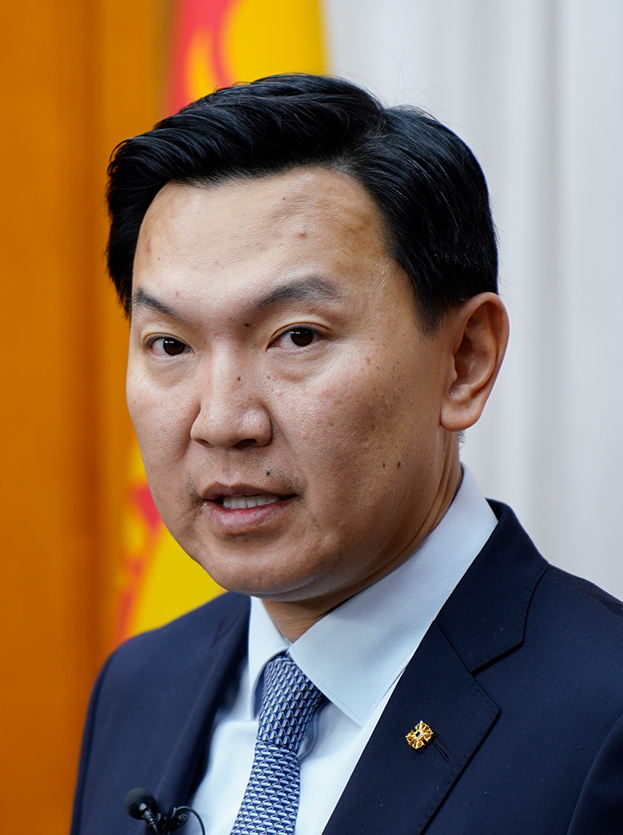
- Top left: Tögs-Ochiryn Namnansüren was de jure the first prime minister of the Bogd Khanate of Mongolia.
- Top right: Yumjaagiin Tsedenbal was the longest-serving prime minister in Mongolian history.
- Bottom left: Luvsannamsrain Oyun-Erdene was the longest-serving prime minister of modern Mongolia.
- Bottom right: Nyam-Osoryn Uchral is the current prime minister of Mongolia.

The prime minister of Mongolia is the head of the Government of Mongolia, which is the highest executive body in Mongolia. The office was de jure established in 1912, shortly after the Bogd Khanate of Mongolia declared its independence from the Qing dynasty during the Mongolian Revolution of 1911. (Note: Outer Mongolia was under military occupation of the Republic of China (ROC) from October 1919 to March 1921. It remained de jure part of the ROC (as the Mongolia Area) until 5 January 1946, when the ROC officially recognized its de facto independence (following the referendum held on 20 October 1945).) Sain Noyon Khan Tögs-Ochiryn Namnansüren was the first officeholder, serving from 1912 until his death in 1919. After the outbreak of the Russian Civil War and Namnansüren's death, Mongolia was reoccupied by the Republic of China in mid-1919.

Da Lama Gonchigjalzangiin Badamdorj was installed as puppet prime minister by warlord Xu Shuzheng, serving until the abolition of Outer Mongolian autonomy in January 1920. Later in February 1921, the Bogd Khanate was restored by White Russian forces led by Roman von Ungern-Sternberg. A rival Red Army-backed People's Provisional Government, with Dambyn Chagdarjav as acting head, was established by the Mongolian People's Party in March 1921. In the aftermath of the People's Revolution of 1921, the Bogd Khan was allowed to remain as a constitutional monarch until his death in 1924. From 1911 to 1924, five men served as prime ministers during the Bogd Khanate.

The Mongolian People's Republic was subsequently established in 1924, ending the theocratic rule entirely. From 1924 to 1992, during the Mongolian People's Republic, the official title of the head of government underwent several changes, namely:

- Chairman of the Council of People's Commissars (1924–1939)
- Chairman of the Council of Ministers (1939–1990)
- Prime Minister (1990–1992)

Throughout 68-year long socialist period, a total of 10 men served as the head of government of the Mongolian People's Republic. Since the adoption of the current Constitution of Mongolia in 1992, 17 men have served as prime minister from 1992 to 2026. The current officeholder is Nyam-Osoryn Uchral, who was appointed on 30 March 2026 by the State Great Khural, the unicameral parliament of Mongolia.

The longest-serving prime minister in Mongolian history was Marshal Yumjaagiin Tsedenbal, who led from 1952 until 1974; the longest-serving prime minister of modern Mongolia was Luvsannamsrain Oyun-Erdene, who held the position from 2021 to 2025. The shortest-serving officeholder was Jalkhanz Khutagt Sodnomyn Damdinbazar, who served for only 2 months in 1921, while the shortest-serving prime minister of modern Mongolia was Janlavyn Narantsatsralt, who served for 225 days from 1998 to 1999.

== Prime ministers of Mongolia (1911–present) ==
† denotes people who died in office.

(Dates in italics indicate de facto continuation of office)

=== Provisional Mongolian Government / Provisional Government of Khalkha / Temporary Government of Khalkha (1911) ===
No.	Portrait	Name (Birth–Death)	Term of office			Political party	Spiritual head (Reign)
No.	Portrait	Name (Birth–Death)	Took office	Left office	Time in office	Political party	Spiritual head (Reign)
Head of the General Administration Office of Khalkh Affairs / Prime Minister of the Provisional Government
–		Gadinbalyn Chagdarjav (1869–1915); Acting	28 November 1911	29 December 1911	1 month	Independent	The 8th Jebtsundamba Khutughtu (1870–1924)

=== Bogd Khanate of Mongolia (1911–1919, 1921–1924) and People's Provisional Government (1921) ===
No.	Portrait	Name (Birth–Death)	Term of office			Political party	Ruler (Reign)
No.	Portrait	Name (Birth–Death)	Took office	Left office	Time in office	Political party	Ruler (Reign)
Prime Minister
–		Da Lama; Gombyn Tserenchimed (1872–1914); Acting	29 December 1911 (Note: 16 December 1911 according to the Julian calendar.)	July 1912	6 months	Independent	Bogd Khan (1911–1924)
Vacant (July – November 1912)							Bogd Khan (1911–1924)
1		Sain Noyon Khan; Tögs-Ochiryn Namnansüren (1878–1919)	November 1912	April 1919 #	6 years, 5 months	Independent	Bogd Khan (1911–1924)
2		Da Lama; Gonchigjalzangiin Badamdorj (1850–1920)	9 April 1919	2 January 1920 (Note: Abolition of Outer Mongolia's autonomy declared by Xu Shuzheng.)	8 months	Independent	Bogd Khan (1911–1924)
Vacant (2 January 1920 – 22 February 1921)							Bogd Khan (1911–1924)
3		Jalkhanz Khutagt; Sodnomyn Damdinbazar (1874–1923) (Note: The first prime minister of an "independent Mongolia" after the Bogd Khan came back to Urga on 21 February 1921. Damdinbazar took office on the same day when the Bogd Khan was officially restored.)	22 February 1921	May 1921	2 months	Independent	Bogd Khan (1911–1924)
–		Manzushir Khutagt; Sambadondogiin Tserendorj (1872–1937); Acting	May 1921	10 July 1921	2 months	Independent	Bogd Khan (1911–1924)
–		Dambyn Chagdarjav (1880–1922); Acting (Note: Prime Minister of the provisional MPP revolutionary government (officially called the People's Provisional Government) in Troitskosavsk, Soviet Russia which was established on 12 March 1921.)	12 March 1921	16 April 1921	35 days	MPP	Bogd Khan (1911–1924)
4		Dogsomyn Bodoo (1885–1922) (Note: Prime Minister of the People's Provisional Government until 11 July 1921.) (Note: The MPP proclaimed the independence of Mongolia during Bodoo's term, on 14 September 1921.)	16 April 1921	7 January 1922	266 days	MPP	Bogd Khan (1911–1924)
Vacant (7 January – 3 March 1922)							Bogd Khan (1911–1924)
5		Jalkhanz Khutagt; Sodnomyn Damdinbazar (1874–1923)	3 March 1922	23 June 1923	1 year, 112 days	MPP	Bogd Khan (1911–1924)
6		Balingiin Tserendorj (1868–1928)	23 June 1923	26 November 1924	1 year, 156 days	MPP→MPRP	Bogd Khan (1911–1924)

=== Mongolian People's Republic (1924–1992) ===
Colour key (for political parties):

Mongolian People's Revolutionary Party (10)

No.	Portrait	Name (Birth–Death)	Term of office			Political party	Great Khural (Convocations)
No.	Portrait	Name (Birth–Death)	Took office	Left office	Time in office	Political party	Great Khural (Convocations)
Chairman of the Council of People's Commissars
(6)		Balingiin Tserendorj (1868–1928)	26 November 1924	13 February 1928 #	3 years, 79 days	MPRP	I (1924)
(6)		Balingiin Tserendorj (1868–1928)	26 November 1924	13 February 1928 #	3 years, 79 days	MPRP	II (1925)
(6)		Balingiin Tserendorj (1868–1928)	26 November 1924	13 February 1928 #	3 years, 79 days	MPRP	III (1926)
(6)		Balingiin Tserendorj (1868–1928)	26 November 1924	13 February 1928 #	3 years, 79 days	MPRP	IV (1927)
Vacant (13 – 21 February 1928)							IV (1927)
7		Anandyn Amar (1886–1941)	21 February 1928	27 April 1930	2 years, 65 days	MPRP	IV (1927)
7		Anandyn Amar (1886–1941)	21 February 1928	27 April 1930	2 years, 65 days	MPRP	V (1928)
8		Tsengeltiin Jigjidjav (1894–1933)	27 April 1930	2 July 1932	2 years, 66 days	MPRP	VI (1930)
9		Peljidiin Genden (1892–1937)	2 July 1932	2 March 1936	3 years, 244 days	MPRP	VI (1930)
9		Peljidiin Genden (1892–1937)	2 July 1932	2 March 1936	3 years, 244 days	MPRP	VII (1934)
Vacant (2 – 22 March 1936)							VII (1934)
10		Anandyn Amar (1886–1941)	22 March 1936	7 March 1939	2 years, 350 days	MPRP	VII (1934)
Vacant (7 – 24 March 1939)							VII (1934)
Chairman of the Council of Ministers							VII (1934)
11		Khorloogiin Choibalsan (1895–1952)	24 March 1939	26 January 1952 #	12 years, 308 days	MPRP	VII (1934)
11		Khorloogiin Choibalsan (1895–1952)	24 March 1939	26 January 1952 #	12 years, 308 days	MPRP	VIII (1940)
11		Khorloogiin Choibalsan (1895–1952)	24 March 1939	26 January 1952 #	12 years, 308 days	MPRP	IX (1949)
11		Khorloogiin Choibalsan (1895–1952)	24 March 1939	26 January 1952 #	12 years, 308 days	MPRP	I (1951)
12		Yumjaagiin Tsedenbal (1916–1991)	26 January 1952	11 June 1974	22 years, 136 days	MPRP	I (1951)
12		Yumjaagiin Tsedenbal (1916–1991)	26 January 1952	11 June 1974	22 years, 136 days	MPRP	II (1954)
12		Yumjaagiin Tsedenbal (1916–1991)	26 January 1952	11 June 1974	22 years, 136 days	MPRP	III (1957)
12		Yumjaagiin Tsedenbal (1916–1991)	26 January 1952	11 June 1974	22 years, 136 days	MPRP	IV (1960)
12		Yumjaagiin Tsedenbal (1916–1991)	26 January 1952	11 June 1974	22 years, 136 days	MPRP	V (1963)
12		Yumjaagiin Tsedenbal (1916–1991)	26 January 1952	11 June 1974	22 years, 136 days	MPRP	VI (1966)
12		Yumjaagiin Tsedenbal (1916–1991)	26 January 1952	11 June 1974	22 years, 136 days	MPRP	VII (1969)
12		Yumjaagiin Tsedenbal (1916–1991)	26 January 1952	11 June 1974	22 years, 136 days	MPRP	VIII (1973)
13		Jambyn Batmönkh (1926–1997)	11 June 1974	12 December 1984	10 years, 184 days	MPRP	VIII (1973)
13		Jambyn Batmönkh (1926–1997)	11 June 1974	12 December 1984	10 years, 184 days	MPRP	IX (1977)
13		Jambyn Batmönkh (1926–1997)	11 June 1974	12 December 1984	10 years, 184 days	MPRP	X (1981)
14		Dumaagiin Sodnom (born 1933)	12 December 1984	21 March 1990	5 years, 99 days	MPRP	X (1981)
14		Dumaagiin Sodnom (born 1933)	12 December 1984	21 March 1990	5 years, 99 days	MPRP	XI (1986)
15		Sharavyn Gungaadorj (born 1935)	21 March 1990	11 September 1990	174 days	MPRP	XI (1986)
15		Sharavyn Gungaadorj (born 1935)	21 March 1990	11 September 1990	174 days	MPRP	XII (1990)
Prime Minister							XII (1990)
16		Dashiin Byambasüren (born 1942)	11 September 1990	12 February 1992	1 year, 154 days	MPRP	XII (1990)

=== Mongolia (1992–present) ===
Colour key (for political parties):

Mongolian People's Revolutionary Party / Mongolian People's Party (11)
Democratic Union Coalition / Democratic Party (7)

No.	Portrait	Name (Birth–Death)	Term of office			Political party	Cabinet	Legislature (Election)	President (Term)	Ref.
No.	Portrait	Name (Birth–Death)	Took office	Left office	Time in office	Political party	Cabinet	Legislature (Election)	President (Term)	Ref.
(16)		Dashiin Byambasüren (born 1942)	12 February 1992	21 July 1992	160 days	MPRP	Unity government (MPRP–MDP–MNPP)	(1990)	Punsalmaagiin Ochirbat (1990–1997)	
17		Puntsagiin Jasrai (1933–2007)	21 July 1992	19 July 1996	3 years, 364 days	MPRP	Jasrai	I (1992)	Punsalmaagiin Ochirbat (1990–1997)	
18		Mendsaikhany Enkhsaikhan (born 1955)	19 July 1996	23 April 1998	1 year, 278 days	DUC	Enkhsaikhan (MNDP–MSDP)	II (1996)	Punsalmaagiin Ochirbat (1990–1997)	
18		Mendsaikhany Enkhsaikhan (born 1955)	19 July 1996	23 April 1998	1 year, 278 days	DUC	Enkhsaikhan (MNDP–MSDP)	II (1996)	Natsagiin Bagabandi (1997–2005)	
19		Tsakhiagiin Elbegdorj (born 1963); 1st term	23 April 1998	9 December 1998	230 days	DUC	Elbegdorj I (MNDP–MSDP)	II (1996)	Natsagiin Bagabandi (1997–2005)	
20		Janlavyn Narantsatsralt (1957–2007)	9 December 1998	22 July 1999	225 days	DUC	Narantsatsralt (MNDP–MSDP)	II (1996)	Natsagiin Bagabandi (1997–2005)	
–		Nyam-Osoryn Tuyaa (born 1958) acting	22 July 1999	30 July 1999	8 days	DUC	Narantsatsralt (MNDP–MSDP)	II (1996)	Natsagiin Bagabandi (1997–2005)	
21		Rinchinnyamyn Amarjargal (born 1961)	30 July 1999	26 July 2000	362 days	DUC	Amarjargal (MNDP–MSDP)	II (1996)	Natsagiin Bagabandi (1997–2005)	
22		Nambaryn Enkhbayar (born 1958)	26 July 2000	20 August 2004	4 years, 25 days	MPRP	Enkhbayar	III (2000)	Natsagiin Bagabandi (1997–2005)	
23		Tsakhiagiin Elbegdorj (born 1963); 2nd term	20 August 2004	13 January 2006	1 year, 146 days	Democratic	Elbegdorj II (DP–MPRP)	IV (2004)	Natsagiin Bagabandi (1997–2005)	
23		Tsakhiagiin Elbegdorj (born 1963); 2nd term	20 August 2004	13 January 2006	1 year, 146 days	Democratic	Elbegdorj II (DP–MPRP)	IV (2004)	Nambaryn Enkhbayar (2005–2009)	
Vacant (13 – 25 January 2006)								IV (2004)	Nambaryn Enkhbayar (2005–2009)	
24		Miyeegombyn Enkhbold (born 1964)	25 January 2006	22 November 2007	1 year, 301 days	MPRP	Enkhbold (MPRP–NNP–M-MDNSP–RP)	IV (2004)	Nambaryn Enkhbayar (2005–2009)	
25		Sanjiin Bayar (born 1956)	22 November 2007	29 October 2009	1 year, 341 days	MPRP	Bayar I (MPRP–CWP–NNP–M-MDNSP)	IV (2004)	Nambaryn Enkhbayar (2005–2009)	
25		Sanjiin Bayar (born 1956)	22 November 2007	29 October 2009	1 year, 341 days	MPRP	Bayar II (MPRP–DP)	V (2008)	Nambaryn Enkhbayar (2005–2009)	
25		Sanjiin Bayar (born 1956)	22 November 2007	29 October 2009	1 year, 341 days	MPRP	Bayar II (MPRP–DP)	V (2008)	Tsakhiagiin Elbegdorj (2009–2017)	
26		Sükhbaataryn Batbold (born 1963)	29 October 2009	10 August 2012	2 years, 286 days	MPRP→MPP (Note: Mongolian People's Revolutionary Party name changed to Mongolian People's Party)	Batbold (MPP–DP)	V (2008)	Tsakhiagiin Elbegdorj (2009–2017)	
27		Norovyn Altankhuyag (born 1958)	10 August 2012	5 November 2014	2 years, 87 days	Democratic	Altankhuyag (DP–JC–CWGP)	VI (2012)	Tsakhiagiin Elbegdorj (2009–2017)	
–		Dendeviin Terbishdagva (born 1955) acting	5 November 2014	21 November 2014	16 days	MPRP (Note: Refers to the splinter Mongolian People's Revolutionary Party (2010–2021).)	Altankhuyag (DP–JC–CWGP)	VI (2012)	Tsakhiagiin Elbegdorj (2009–2017)	
28		Chimediin Saikhanbileg (born 1969)	21 November 2014	7 July 2016	1 year, 229 days	Democratic	Saikhanbileg I (DP–MPP–JC)	VI (2012)	Tsakhiagiin Elbegdorj (2009–2017)	
28		Chimediin Saikhanbileg (born 1969)	21 November 2014	7 July 2016	1 year, 229 days	Democratic	Saikhanbileg II (DP–JC)	VI (2012)	Tsakhiagiin Elbegdorj (2009–2017)	
29		Jargaltulgyn Erdenebat (born 1973)	7 July 2016	4 October 2017	1 year, 89 days	MPP	Erdenebat	VII (2016)	Tsakhiagiin Elbegdorj (2009–2017)	
29		Jargaltulgyn Erdenebat (born 1973)	7 July 2016	4 October 2017	1 year, 89 days	MPP	Erdenebat	VII (2016)	Khaltmaagiin Battulga (2017–2021)	
30		Ukhnaagiin Khürelsükh (born 1968)	4 October 2017	27 January 2021	3 years, 115 days	MPP	Khürelsükh I	VII (2016)	Khaltmaagiin Battulga (2017–2021)	
31		Ukhnaagiin Khürelsükh (born 1968)	4 October 2017	27 January 2021	3 years, 115 days	MPP	Khürelsükh II	VIII (2020)	Khaltmaagiin Battulga (2017–2021)	
32		Luvsannamsrain Oyun-Erdene (born 1980)	27 January 2021	13 June 2025	4 years, 137 days	MPP	Oyun-Erdene I	VIII (2020)	Khaltmaagiin Battulga (2017–2021)	
32		Luvsannamsrain Oyun-Erdene (born 1980)	27 January 2021	13 June 2025	4 years, 137 days	MPP	Oyun-Erdene I	VIII (2020)	Ukhnaagiin Khürelsükh (2021–2026)	
33		Luvsannamsrain Oyun-Erdene (born 1980)	27 January 2021	13 June 2025	4 years, 137 days	MPP	Oyun-Erdene II (MPP–DP–HUN)	IX (2024)	Ukhnaagiin Khürelsükh (2021–2026)	
34		Gombojavyn Zandanshatar (born 1970)	13 June 2025	30 March 2026	290 days	MPP	Zandanshatar (MPP–HUN–CWGP)	IX (2024)	Ukhnaagiin Khürelsükh (2021–2026)	
35		Nyam-Osoryn Uchral (born 1987)	30 March 2026	Incumbent	235 days	MPP	Uchral (MPP–HUN–NC)	IX (2024)	Ukhnaagiin Khürelsükh (2021–2026)	
35		Nyam-Osoryn Uchral (born 1987)	30 March 2026	Incumbent	235 days	MPP	Uchral (MPP–HUN–NC)	IX (2024)	Sandagiin Byambatsogt (acting; since 2026)	

== See also ==
- List of Mongol rulers
- President of Mongolia
  - List of heads of state of Mongolia
- Prime Minister of Mongolia
- Chairman of the State Great Khural
  - List of chairmen of the State Great Khural
- List of de facto leaders of the Mongolian People's Republic
