= List of chairmen of the State Great Khural =

This article contains the list of chairmen of the State Great Khural of Mongolia.

The post of Chairman of the State Great Khural officially existed in Mongolia twice. First time in the Bogd Khanate of Mongolia from 1914 to 1919, as the Chairman of the State Upper Khural, during which the post was only held by Prime Minister Tögs-Ochiryn Namnansüren. The second time, in Mongolia since 1992, after the establishment of a unicameral State Great Khural.

Between 1924 and 1990, the legislatures of the Mongolian People's Republic (MPR) were effectively rubber-stamp with most functions exercised by its presidium, which met inbetween sessions of the legislature, or respective ministries of the Council of Ministers. From 1924 to 1951, the MPR had a bicameral legislature, the Great Khural and the Little Khural. The People's Great Khural, the supreme state organ of power, was similarly a rubber-stamp legislature with a presidium from 1951 until September 1990, when the legislature created the presidency and a standing legislature (lower house), the Little Khural. With main legislative powers vested in the Little Khural, the chairman of the State Little Khural is considered by the modern parliament of Mongolia as the predecessor position to the present chairman.

Currently, the post is held by Sandagiin Byambatsogt since 3 April 2026.

== List of officeholders ==
=== Bogd Khanate of Mongolia (1911–1919, 1921–1924) ===
| No. | Portrait | Name (Birth–Death) | Term of office | | | Political party |
| No. | Portrait | Name (Birth–Death) | Took office | Left office | Time in office | Political party |
Chairman of the State Upper Khural
| 1 | | Tögs-Ochiryn Namnansüren (1878–1919) | February 1914 | April 1919 # | 5 years, 2 months | Independent |
| – | | Balingiin Tserendorj (1868–1928); Acting | 20 May 1924 | 26 November 1924 | 190 days | MPRP |

=== Mongolian People's Republic (1924–1992) ===
| No. | Portrait | Name (Birth–Death) | Term of office | | | Political party | Legislature |
| No. | Portrait | Name (Birth–Death) | Took office | Left office | Time in office | Political party | Legislature |
Chairman of the People's Great Khural (Note: The Chairman of the People's Great Khural isn't included in the official modern numbering. The role existed since 1951 and was the presiding officer of the unicameral People's Great Khural from 1951 to 1990. Since September 1990, the post presided over the now upper house, People's Great Khural.)
| – | | Jambyn Gombojav (born 1941) | 3 September 1990 | c. 1991 | c. 1 year | MPRP | XII (1990) |
| – | | Jambaldorjiin Urtnasan (1942–2009) | c. 1991 | 29 July 1992 | c. 1 year | MPRP | XII (1990) |
| Chairman of the State Little Khural | | | | | | | XII (1990) |
| 1 (Note: The Chairman of the State Little Khural is included in the official numbering of Chairmen of the State Great Khural.) | | Radnaasümbereliin Gonchigdorj (born 1953) | 13 September 1990 | 29 July 1992 | 1 year, 330 days | MSDP | XII (1990) |

=== Mongolia (since 1992) ===
Colour key (for political parties):

Mongolian People's Party (12)
Democratic Party / Democratic Union (2)
Mongolian Social Democratic Party (1)

| No. | Portrait | Name (Birth–Death) | Term of office | | | Political party | Legislature |
| No. | Portrait | Name (Birth–Death) | Took office | Left office | Time in office | Political party | Legislature |
Chairman of the State Great Khural
| 1 | | Natsagiin Bagabandi (born 1950) | July 1992 | July 1996 | 6 years | MPRP | I (1992) |
| 2 | | Radnaasümbereliin Gonchigdorj (born 1953) | July 1996 | July 2000 | 4 years | DUC (MSDP) | II (1996) |
| 3 | | Lkhamsurengiin Enebish (1947–2001) | July 2000 | 29 September 2001 # | 1 year, 2 months | MPRP | III (2000) |
| – | | Jamsrangiin Byambadorj (born 1954); Acting | 29 September 2001 | 19 October 2001 | 20 days | MPRP | III (2000) |
| 4 | | Sanjbegziin Tumur-Ochir (born 1950) | 19 October 2001 | 9 July 2004 | 2 years, 264 days | MPRP | III (2000) |
| 5 | | Nambaryn Enkhbayar (born 1958) | 13 August 2004 | June 2005 | 9 months | MPRP | IV (2004) |
| 6 | | Tsendiin Nyamdorj (born 1956) | 1 July 2005 | 14 June 2007 | 1 year, 348 days | MPRP | IV (2004) |
| 7 | | Danzangiin Lundeejantsan (born 1957) | 19 June 2007 | 29 August 2008 | 1 year, 71 days | MPRP | IV (2004) |
| 8 | | Damdiny Demberel (born 1941) | 1 September 2008 | 24 July 2012 | 3 years, 327 days | MPRP → MPP | V (2008) |
| 9 | | Zandaakhüügiin Enkhbold (born 1966) | 24 July 2012 | 5 July 2016 | 3 years, 347 days | Democratic | VI (2012) |
| 10 | | Miyeegombyn Enkhbold (born 1964) | 5 July 2016 | 29 January 2019 | 2 years, 208 days | MPP | VII (2016) |
| 11 | | Gombojavyn Zandanshatar (born 1970) | 1 February 2019 | 30 June 2020 | 5 years, 152 days | MPP | VII (2016) |
| 11 | | Gombojavyn Zandanshatar (born 1970) | 30 June 2020 | 2 July 2024 | 5 years, 152 days | MPP | VIII (2020) |
| 12 | | Dashzegviin Amarbayasgalan (born 1981) | 2 July 2024 | 17 October 2025 | 1 year, 107 days | MPP | IX (2024) |
| – | | Bökhchuluuny Pürevdorj (born 1973); Acting | 17 October 2025 | 12 November 2025 | 26 days | Democratic | IX (2024) |
| – | | Jadambyn Bat-Erdene (born 1965); Acting | 12 November 2025 | 20 November 2025 | 8 days | MPP | IX (2024) |
| 13 | | Nyam-Osoryn Uchral (born 1987) | 20 November 2025 | 30 March 2026 | 130 days | MPP | IX (2024) |
| – | | Jadambyn Bat-Erdene (born 1965); Acting | 30 March 2026 | 3 April 2026 | 4 days | MPP | IX (2024) |
| 14 | | Sandagiin Byambatsogt (born 1974) | 3 April 2026 | Incumbent | 224 days | MPP | IX (2024) |

== See also ==
- State Great Khural
  - Chairman of the State Great Khural
- Prime Minister of Mongolia
  - List of prime ministers of Mongolia
- President of Mongolia
  - List of heads of state of Mongolia
