= Economy of the Mongolian People's Republic =

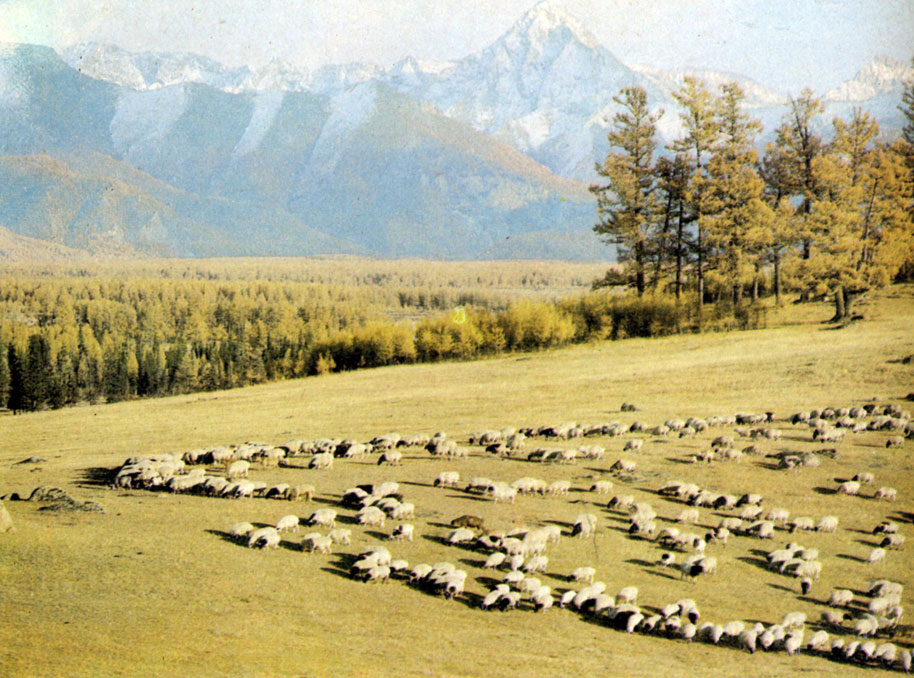
- Sheep grazing near the Bogd Khan Mountain. Agriculture was a critical sector of Mongolia's economy, accounting 60-90% of exports and 45% of the labor force in 1985.
- Currency: Mongolian tugrik (MNT, ₮)
- Fiscal year: 1 January–31 December (calendar year)
- Trade organisations: Comecon, ESCAP

Statistics
- GDP: $1.7 billion (1989)
- GDP per capita: $880 (1985)
- GDP by sector: industry: 32.4%; agriculture: 18.3%; construction: 4.9%; transport and communications: 11.2%; services: 31.6%; (1985 est.)
- Labour force: 447,300 (1975)
- Labour force by occupation: industry: 21.4%; agriculture: 45.0%; construction: 5.8%; transport and communications: 5.9%; services: 21.7%; (1975 est.)
- Main industries: Processing of animal products, building materials, food and beverage, mining (particularly coal)

External
- Exports: $388 million (1985)
- Export goods: Livestock, animal products, wool, hides, fluorspar, non-ferrous metals, minerals (1985)
- Main export partners: Comecon 94.2%; (80% with the USSR); China & North Korea 2.5%; non-communist countries 3.3%; (1986 est.)
- Imports: $1.0 billion (1985)
- Import goods: Machinery and equipment, fuels, food products, industrial consumer goods, chemicals, building materials, sugar, tea (1985)
- Main import partners: Comecon 96.7%; (80% with the USSR); China & North Korea 1.6%; non-communist countries 1.7%; (1986 est.)

Public finance
- Revenue: $2.2 billion (1987)
- Spending: $2.19 billion, including capital expenditures of $0.9 billion (1987)
- Economic aid: ~$500-$700 million annually from the USSR (Soviet assistance from 1955 to 1983 is estimated to be worth $7 billion)
- All values, unless otherwise stated, are in US dollars.

The economy of the Mongolian People's Republic (Mongolia; MPR) was a command economy, modeled after the Soviet Union, based on the principles of Marxism-Leninism. Unlike the economies of other Eastern Bloc countries, Mongolia's economy had never undergone a capitalist period before its socialist phase. Thereby, an entirely new path of "non-capitalist way of development" had been implemented in the MPR and the Central Asian Soviet Republics.

The economy of Mongolia was highly dependent on the Soviet Union in the wake of the Sino-Soviet split and Mongolia forming close ties to the Soviet Union. In the 1980s, 80% of Mongolia's trade was with the Soviet Union (15% was with other countries of Comecon), and in the late 1970s, more than 10% of Mongolia's GNP was soviet aid. The MPR depended upon the Soviet Union for fuel, medicine, and spare parts for its factories and power plants. The USSR served as the primary market for Mongolian industry. In the 1980s, Mongolia's industrial sector became increasingly important. By 1989, it accounted for an estimated 34% of material products, compared to 18% from agriculture. However, minerals, animals, and animal-derived products still constituted a large proportion of the country's exports. Principal imports included machinery, petroleum, cloth, and building materials.

The political changes of the late 1980s and the democratic revolution in 1990 marked the beginning of Mongolia's efforts to transition to a market economy; however, these efforts have been complicated and disrupted by the dissolution and subsequent deterioration of the Soviet economy.

== Background ==
Following the collapse of the Mongol Empire, Mongolia was largely incorporated into Qing China under a feudal system. The Mongolian upper class paid taxes to the Qing emperor, although the Buddhist monasteries and temples, as well as their lamas, did not pay taxes. These temples were centres of education and health care, although the majority of economic activity was in the form of nomadic herding. Mongolia, which has roughly 2% arable land, had little crop cultivation.

Although trade was typically in the form of a physical medium (sheep or bricks of tea), by the mid-1800s, foreign currency, such as silver taels, had begun to circulate. Mongol nobles also issued limited numbers of banknotes for use within their own territories.

On the eve of the People's Revolution of 1921, Mongolia had an underdeveloped, stagnant economy based on nomadic animal husbandry. Farming and industry were almost nonexistent; transportation and communications were primitive; banking, services, and trade were almost exclusively in the hands of Chinese or other foreigners. Most of the people were illiterate nomadic herders, and a large part of the male labour force lived in the monasteries, contributing little to the economy. Property in the form of livestock was owned primarily by aristocrats and monasteries; ownership of the remaining sectors of the economy was dominated by the Chinese or other foreigners.

Between 1900 and 1920, both taxation and interest rates rose significantly. Individuals outside of monasteries owed a great deal to temples to cover their debts, with loans carrying interest rates of 40 to 60%.

== Periods ==
=== 1921–1939 ===
Mongolia's economic development under communist control can be divided into three periods: 1921–1939; 1940–1960; and 1961 to the present. During the first period, which the Mongolian government called the stage of "general democratic transformation," the economy remained primarily agrarian and underdeveloped. After an abortive attempt to collectivize herders, livestock remained in private hands. The state began to develop industry based on the processing of animal husbandry products and crop raising on state farms. Transportation, communications, domestic and foreign trade, and banking and finance were nationalized with Soviet assistance; they were placed under the control of the Mongolian state and cooperative organizations or Mongolian-Soviet joint-stock companies. Ulaanbaatar became the nation's industrial center.

=== 1940–1960 ===
During the second period, called the "construction of the foundations of socialism," agriculture was collectivized, and industry was diversified into mining, timber processing, and consumer goods production. Central planning of the economy began in 1931 with an abortive five-year plan and with annual plans in 1941; five-year plans began anew with the First Five-Year Plan (1948–52). Soviet aid increased, allowing the construction of the Trans-Mongolian Railway (the Ulaanbaatar Railroad), and various industrial projects. Although industrial development was still concentrated in Ulaanbaatar, economic decentralization began with the completion of the Ulaanbaatar Railway and the establishment of food processing plants in Aimag centers.

=== 1960–1992 ===
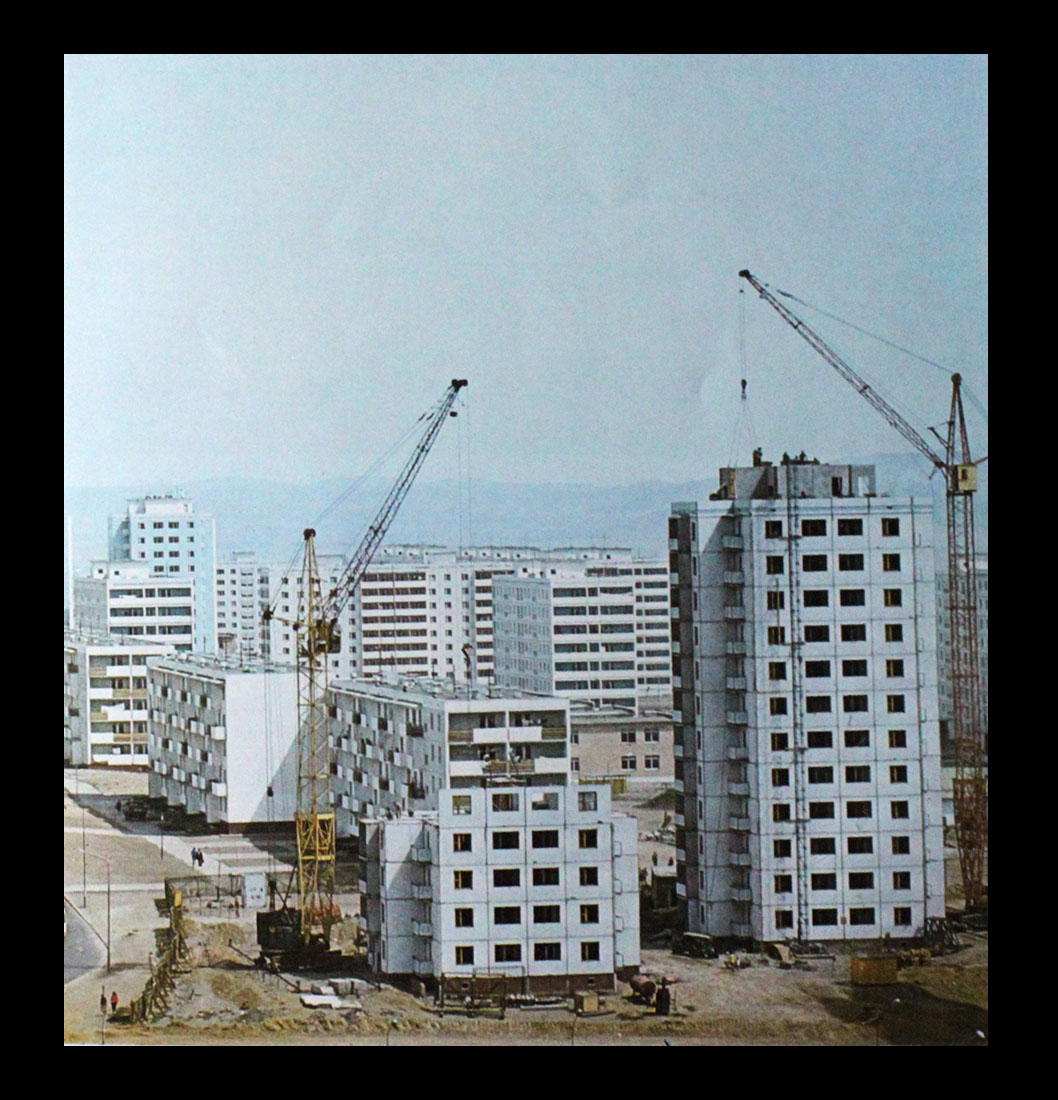
Mass construction of Ugsarmal panel buildings in Ulaanbaatar, circa 1974

The third stage, which the government called the "completion of the construction of the material and technical basis of socialism," saw further industrialization and agricultural growth, aided largely by Mongolia's joining the Council for Mutual Economic Assistance (Comecon) in 1962. After the Sino-Soviet split, Chinese aid ceased, but continued with Soviet and Eastern European financial and technical assistance in the forms of credits, advisers, and joint ventures, enabling Mongolia to modernize and to diversify industry, particularly in the mining sector. New industrial centers were built in Baganuur, Choibalsan, Darkhan, and Erdenet, and industrial output rose significantly. Although animal husbandry was stagnant, crop production increased dramatically with the development of virgin lands by state farms. Foreign trade with Comecon nations grew substantially. Transportation and communications systems were improved, linking population and industrial centers and extending to more remote rural areas. By the late 1980s, Mongolia had developed into an agricultural-industrial economy, due to the efficiencies of a centrally planned and managed economy and communist foreign aid. Yet, Mongolian leaders decided to undertake a reform program modeled after the example of perestroika in the Soviet Union.

== Role of the government ==
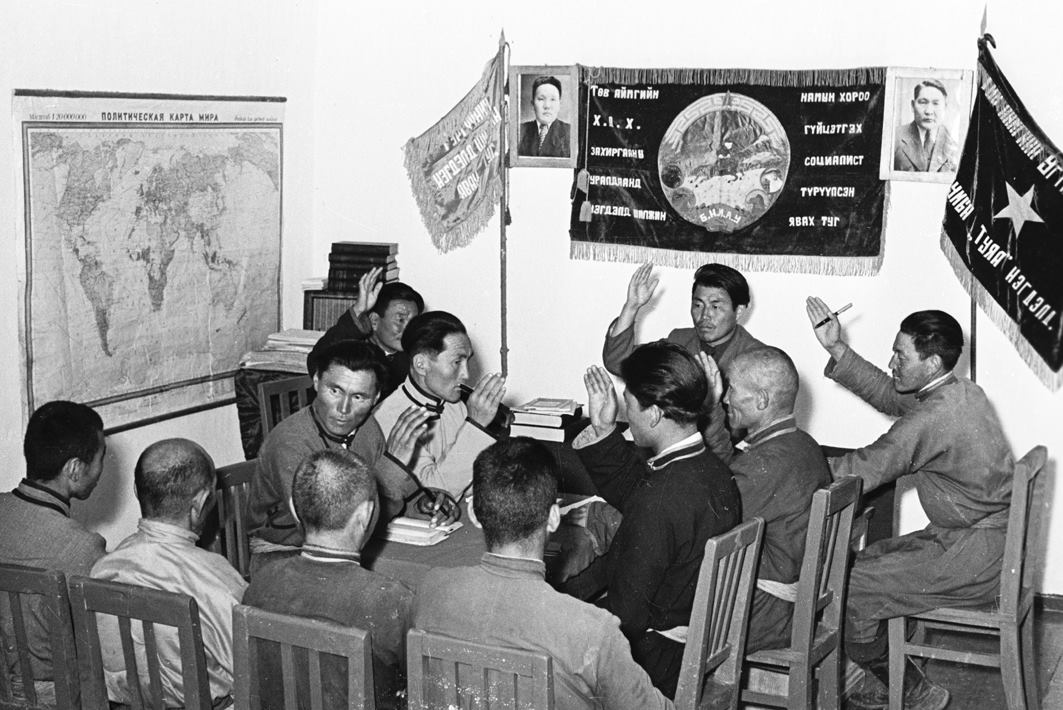
A cooperative or negdel in Töv aimag in the 1950s

In the late 1980s, Mongolia had a planned economy based on socialist ownership of the means of production. According to the Constitution of the Mongolian People's Republic, socialist ownership has two forms: state ownership (of land and natural resources, economic facilities and infrastructure; and the property of all state organizations, enterprises, and institutions) and cooperative ownership (property of agricultural associations and other types of cooperatives). Private ownership was negligible in all sectors of the economy, except animal husbandry, but economic reforms adopted since 1986 gave greater leeway for individual and cooperative enterprises.

The economy was directed by a single state national economic plan, which, when confirmed by the legislature, the People's Great Khural, had the force of law. In accordance with the plan, the state annually drew up a state budget, which was confirmed and published in the form of a law. The Council of Ministers constitutionally was charged with planning the national economy; implementing the national economic plan and the state and local budgets; directing financial and credit policy; exercising a foreign trade monopoly; establishing and directing the activities of ministries and other state institutions concerned with economic construction; defending socialist production; and strengthening socialist ownership.

In December 1987 and January 1988, the top-level state economic organizations under the Council of Ministers were reorganized. The State Planning and Economic Committee was formed out of the former State Planning Commission, the State Labor and Social Welfare Committee, the State Prices and Standards Committee, and the Central Statistical Board. New economic entities were the Ministry of Agriculture and Food Industry; the Ministry of Environmental Protection; the Ministry of Foreign Economic Relations and Supply; the Ministry of Light Industry; and the Ministry of Power, Mining Industry, and Geology. Unaffected by the reorganization were the Ministry of Social Economy and Services, the Ministry of Communications, the Ministry of Finance, the Ministry of Transport, the State Construction Committee, and the State Bank of the Mongolian People's Republic. Local government organizations—the executive committees of khurals—implemented economic plans and budgets, directed economic construction, and supervised the work of economic and cooperative organizations at their level.

== Planning ==
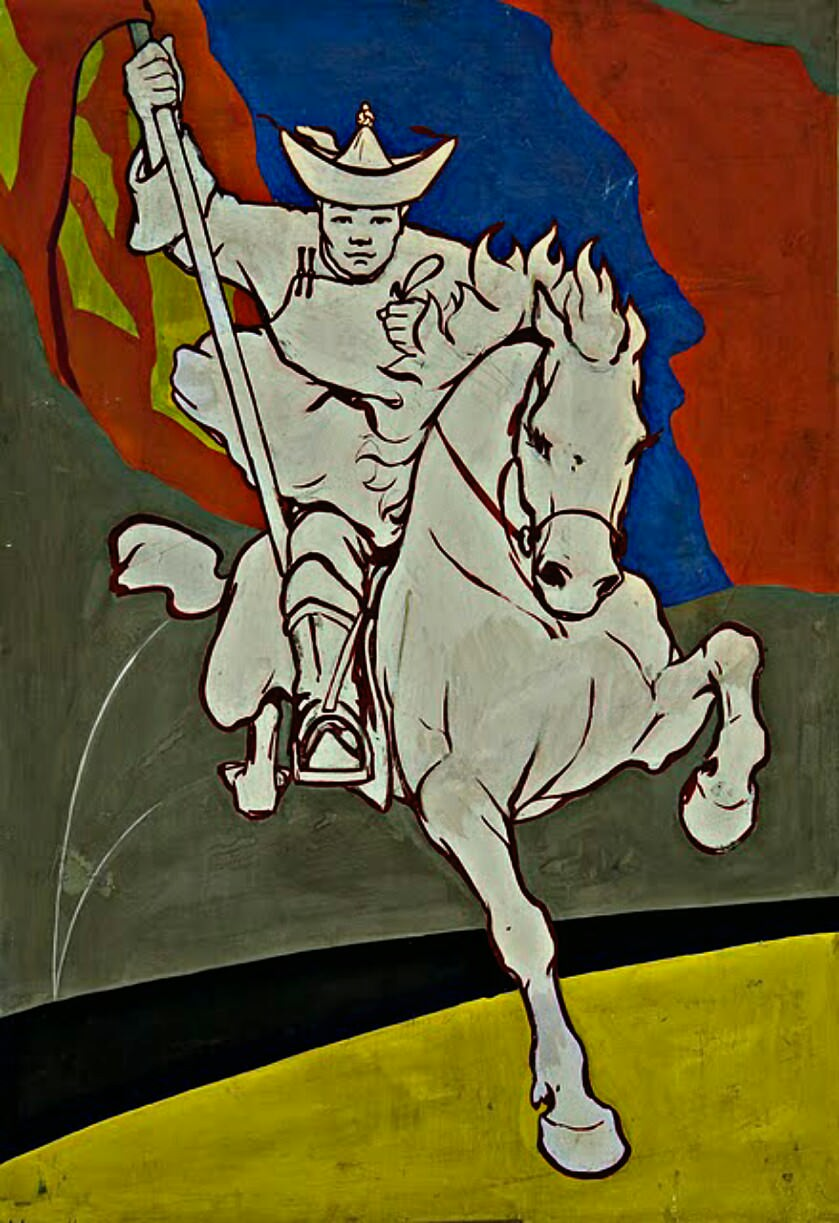
"Leaper of Capitalism" by Dagdangiin Amgalan, 1961

Planning in the Mongolian People's Republic had an inauspicious start with the Five-Year Plan for 1931–35, which set unrealistically high targets for production and called for the collectivization of agricultural production. This plan was abandoned in 1932 in the face of widespread resistance to collectivization and the failure to meet production goals. Annual planning was introduced in 1941 in an effort to deal with wartime shortages during the Second World War. Five-year plans were reintroduced in 1948 with the First Plan. The Second Five-Year Plan (1953–57) was followed by the Three-Year Plan (1958–60). Regular five-year plans were resumed with the Third Five-Year Plan (1961–65), and they continued to be used afterward.

In the late 1980s, economic planning in Mongolia included long-term, five-year, and annual plans that operated on multiple levels. Planning originated with the sole legal Mongolian People's Revolutionary Party, which produced the guidelines for economic and social development for the five-year period corresponding to the party's congress. Based on these guidelines, the Standing Commission on Economic-Budget Affairs of the People's Great Khural drafted the five-year national and annual economic plans, which were approved by the legislature and became law. The Council of Ministers directed and implemented national planning through the State Planning and Economic Committee and through the Ministry of Finance. Planning for different sectors of the economy was conducted by relevant ministries and state committees; local plans were drawn up by local governmental organizations.

Mongolia's five-year plans were coordinated with those of the Soviet Union beginning in 1961 and with Comecon multilateral five-year plans beginning in 1976. Annual plan coordination with the Soviet Union, which was made official in signed protocols, began in 1971. Mongolian planners were trained by Soviet planners and cooperated with them in drafting long-term plans, such as the General Scheme for the Development and Location of the Mongolian People's Republic Productive Forces up to 1990, produced in the late 1970s; and the Longterm Program for the Development of Economic, Scientific, and Technical Cooperation Between the Mongolian People' Republic and the USSR for the Period up to 2000, signed in 1985.

National economic plans included general development goals as well as specific targets and quotas for agriculture, capital construction and investment, domestic and foreign trade, industry, labor resources and wages, retail sales and services, telecommunications, and transportation. The plans also focused on such social development goals and targets as improved living standards, population increase, cultural development, and scientific and technical development.

== Budget ==
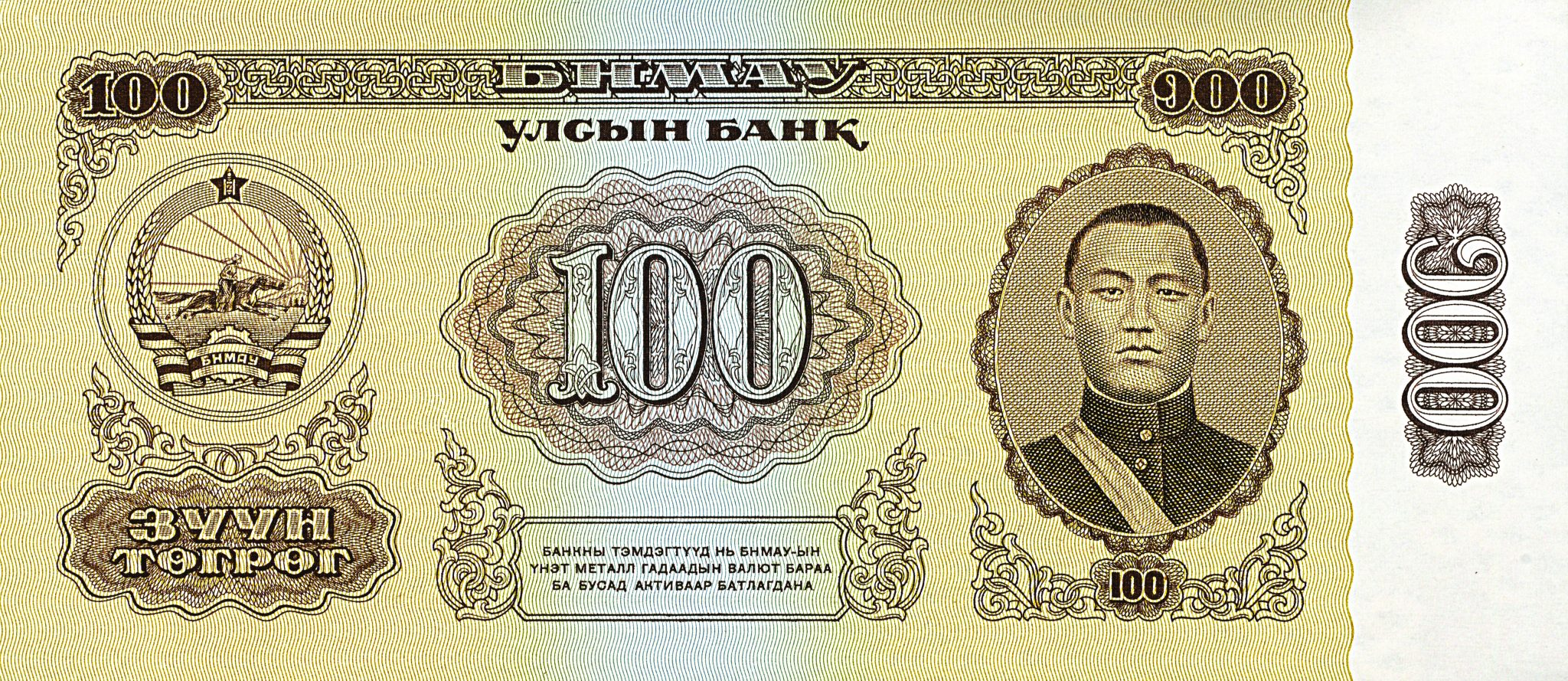
A hundred Mongolian tugrik banknote (1980s)

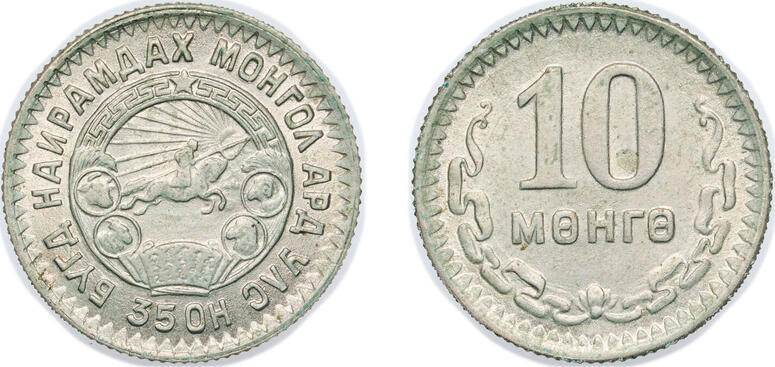
Ten Möngö coin (1945)

The Ministry of Finance prepared annual national budgets and provided guidance on the formulation of local budgets. The national budget included the budget of the central government, the budgets of aimag and city governments, and the budget of the national social insurance fund. The national budget grew with the expansion of the economy: In 1940, revenues were 123.9 million Mongolian tugriks and expenditures, 122.1 million tugriks; in 1985, revenues were 5,743 million tugriks and expenditures, 5,692.5 million tugriks.

The structure of the national budget changed between 1940 and 1985. In 1940, some 34.6 percent of revenues came from the turnover tax (a value-added tax on each transaction), 7.8 percent from deductions from profits, 16.7 percent from taxes on the population, and 40.9 percent from other kinds of income. In 1985, nearly 63 percent of revenues came from the turnover tax, 29.9 percent from deductions from profits, 3.5 percent from deductions from the social insurance fund, 0.7 percent from taxes on the population, and 3.2 percent from other types of income.

In 1940, some 21.9 percent of expenditures went toward developing the national economy; 19.7 percent to social and cultural programs; and 58.4 percent to defense, state administration, reserves, and other expenses. In 1985, about 42.6 percent of expenditures went to developing the national economy; 38.7 percent to social and cultural programs; and 18.7 percent to defense, state administration, reserves, and other expenses.

The proposed 1989 budget had revenues and expenditures of 6.97 billion tugriks. Proposed expenditures for 1989 included 1.8 billion tugriks for developing agriculture, 2.1 billion for industry, and 1.6 billion for capital investment. Of the 2.76 billion tugriks proposed for social and cultural development, 1.16 billion was to go for education; 597.5 million for health, physical culture, and sports; 259.7 million for science, culture, and art; and 747.4 million for the social insurance fund. Subsidies to maintain stable retail prices totaled 213 million tugriks. Local budgets, through which 70 percent of social and cultural expenditures were funneled, totaled 3.46 billion tugriks.

== Structure ==
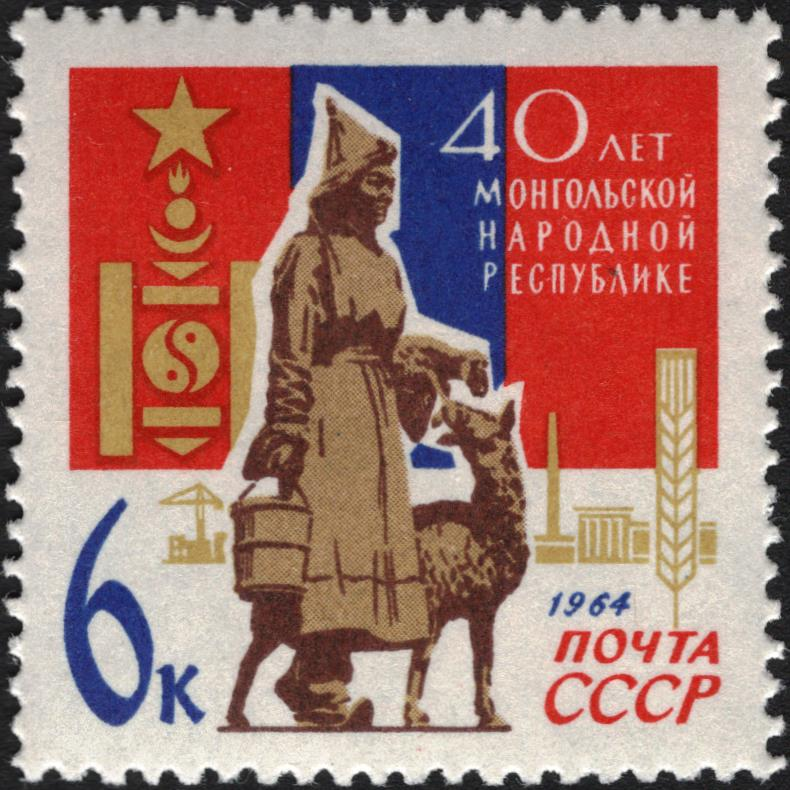
1964 Soviet stamp marking the 40th anniversary of the MPR

Socialist development transformed Mongolia from a predominantly agrarian, nomadic economy in 1921 into a developing, agricultural-industrial economy in the late 1980s. In 1985, a reported 18.3 percent of the produced national income was derived from agriculture, 32.4 percent from industry, 4.9 percent from construction, 11.2 percent from transportation and communications, 31.6 percent from domestic trade and services, and 1.6 percent from other sectors. Sixty percent of disposable national income went to consumption, and 40 percent went to accumulation. Fixed assets totaled about 38.9 billion tugriks, of which 66.5 percent were productive fixed assets, including livestock, and 33.5 percent were nonproductive. Industry and construction accounted for 38.1 percent of the productive fixed assets; agriculture, 16 percent; transportation and communications, 9 percent; and domestic trade and services, 3.4 percent. Investment totaled 4.624 billion tugriks, 97.9 percent of which went to the state sector, and 2.1 percent, to the cooperative sector. During the Seventh Five-Year Plan (1981–85), 68.9 percent of investments went into the productive sectors of the economy, and 31.1 percent, into nonproductive sectors. Industry and construction received 44.7 percent of investment during this period; agriculture, 13.9 percent; transportation and communications, 9.0 percent; and domestic trade and services, 1.3 percent. The Eighth Five-Year Plan (1986–90) called for increasing produced national income by 26 to 29 percent and for raising investment by 24 to 26 percent, of which 70 percent was to go to developing material production.

=== Regional development ===
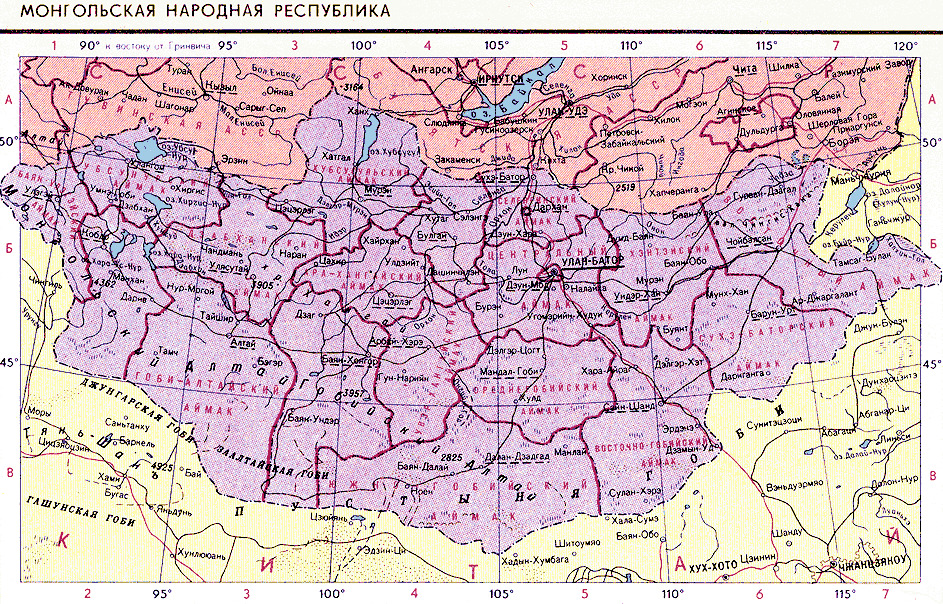
Map of the Mongolian People's Republic, around the late 1960s or early 1970s

In the late 1980s, Mongolia was divided into three economic regions. The western region (Bayan-Ölgii, Khovd, Uvs, Zavkhan, and Govi-Altai aimags), with 21 percent of the nation's population, was predominantly agricultural. The western region had 32 percent of Mongolia's livestock and produced about 30 percent of its wool and meat. Local industry was engaged in the processing of animal husbandry products, timber, minerals, and building materials. Transportation was predominantly by motor vehicles.

The central economic region (Arkhangai, Bayankhongor, Bulgan, Darkhan-Uul, Dornogovi, Dundgovi, Khövsgöl, Ömnögovi, Övörkhangai, Selenge, Töv aimags, and Ulaanbaatar) was the dominant producer. The region had 70 percent of Mongolia's population (including the cities of Darkhan, Erdenet, and Ulaanbaatar); 55 percent of its territory; 75 percent of its arable land; 90 percent of its surveyed coal deposits; and 100 percent of copper, molybdenum, iron ore, and phosphate deposits. This region accounted for 80 percent of gross industrial production, 90 percent of light industrial production, and 80 percent of food industry production, 75 percent of coal production, and 100 percent of copper-molybdenum, iron ore, and phosphate mining. It also accounted for 60 percent of gross agricultural production, 60 percent of milk production, 50 percent of meat production, and 80 percent of grain, potato, and vegetable production.

The eastern economic region (Dornod, Khentii, and Sükhbaatar aimags) had 9 percent of Mongolia's population, 20 percent of the arable land, and 15 percent of the livestock. The region contributed 15 percent of gross meat production and 13 percent of wool production. Grain production on large state farms hewed out of virgin lands contributed 90 percent of the region's agricultural output. The major industrial center was Choibalsan city, the provincial capital of Dornod, which produced 50 percent of the regional gross industrial output.

== Economic reforms ==
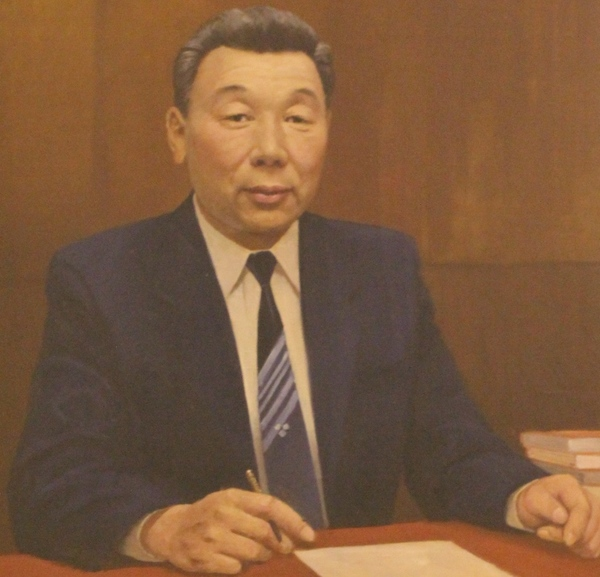
Dumaagiin Sodnom (pictured), a member of the Politburo and Chairman of the Council of Ministers from 1984 to 1990, oversaw the economic reforms of the late 1980s

In the late 1980s, dissatisfaction with the economic stagnation of the last years of the former regime of Yumjaagiin Tsedenbal and the influence of the Soviet perestroika led Mongolia to launch its own program of economic reforms.

This program had five goals:

1. Acceleration of development
2. Application of science and technology to production
3. Reform of management and planning
4. Greater independence of enterprises
5. A balance of individual, collective, and societal interests

Acceleration of development in general was to result from the attainment of the other four goals. Scientific research was being redirected to better serve economic development, with electronics, automation, biotechnology, and the creation of materials becoming the priority areas of research and cooperation with Comecon countries.

Reform of management and planning began in 1986 with the first of several rounds of reorganization of governmental bodies dealing with the economy. These changes rationalized and streamlined state economic organizations; reduced the number of administrative positions by 3,000; and saved 20 million tugriks between 1986 and 1988. The role of the central planning bodies was to be reduced by limiting the duties of the State Planning and Economic Committee to overseeing general capital-investment policy. The indicators specified in the five-year and the annual national economic plans also were to be decreased. State committees and ministries, rather than the State Planning and Economic Committee, were to decide upon machinery and equipment purchases. Decentralization of economic management also was to extend to aimag and city administrations and enterprises. These bodies were given greater autonomy in construction and production, and they also were held financially responsible for profits and losses.

Efforts to devolve economic decision making to the enterprise level began in 1986, when more than 100 enterprises began experimenting with financial autonomy (before then, enterprises operating with a deficit had been subsidized by the state). Enterprises were accountable for their own losses, and they were responsible for fulfilling sales contracts and export orders. The draft law on state enterprises, presented to the People's Great Khural in December 1988, was to extend greater independence in economic matters to all state enterprises and to lead to an economy that combined planning and market mechanisms.

Under provisions of the draft law, state enterprises were to be authorized to make their own annual and five-year plans and to negotiate with state and local authorities to pay taxes based on long-term quotas. State enterprises also were to sell output exceeding state orders and unused assets; to establish their own, or to cooperate with existing, scientific organizations to solve scientific and technical problems; to be financially responsible for losses, and to pay back bank loans; to set prices independently; to establish wage rates based on enterprise profitability; to purchase materials and goods from individuals, collectives, state distribution organizations, and wholesale trade enterprises; to establish direct ties with foreign economic organizations; to manage their own foreign currency; and to conduct foreign trade.

The draft law stipulated that enterprises were to be divided into two categories. National enterprises were to be the responsibility of ministries, state committees, and departments; local enterprises were to be supervised by executive committees of aimag and city administrations or members of local khurals. State and local bodies were not to interfere in the day-to-day decision-making of enterprises, but they were responsible for ensuring that enterprises obeyed the law and that they did not suppress the interests of society. Enterprises were allowed to form three kinds of associations: production associations, scientific production associations, and enterprise associations to coordinate economic affairs. Finally, the draft law said that the state was the owner of state enterprises and that the labor collective was the lawful manager of a state enterprise. The labor collective was to elect a labor collective council, which was to ensure that the enterprise director (who acted on behalf of the collective and the state) met the interests of the collective in managing the enterprise. It was unclear how the relationship between the enterprise director and the labor collective would work out in practice.

Balancing the interests of society, the collective, and the individual entailed providing scope for individual and collective initiative to increase production and efficiency. Enlarging the scope for individual initiative had three aspects: linking wages to enterprise profitability, permitting output exceeding state plans to be sold for profit, and providing employment opportunities outside the state and the cooperative sectors. In 1988, wage scales dependent on enterprise revenues were introduced to the light and food industries and to the domestic trade sector, resulting in a reduction in materials utilized by those sectors. Beginning in late 1986, state farms and negdels (agricultural stations) were eligible for state payments for output exceeding the annual average growth rate for the previous five-year plan. Individual agricultural cooperative members and workers were allowed to increase the number of privately held livestock. The draft law also stipulated that enterprises could sell production exceeding plan targets for their own profit. In 1987, the government began encouraging the formation of voluntary labor associations, auxiliary farms, and sideline production attached to enterprises, schools, and so forth to increase production of foodstuffs and consumer goods, to engage in primary processing of agricultural goods, and to provide services. The authorities permitted the formation of individual and family-based cooperatives; by 1988, there were 480 such cooperatives. Contracting among state farms and both agricultural cooperatives and families was permitted and was increasing in the late 1980s.

== See also ==
- Economy of Mongolia
- State socialism
- Soviet-type economic planning
- Administrative command economy
- Eastern Bloc economies
