= Constitutions of the Mongolian People's Republic =

State emblem of the Mongolian People's Republic from 1960 to 1992

The Mongolian People's Republic had three communist state constitutions, in effect from 1924, 1940, and 1960.

== 1924 Constitution ==
The first constitution was passed by the First State Great Khural on November 26, 1924. It abolished the monarchical system under Buddhist theocracy and established a people's republic, described the legislative consolidation of state power, provided a basic statement of socioeconomic and political rights and freedoms for the people, and espoused a national program that would bypass the capitalist stage of development in the course of promoting fundamental social transformations in order to bring about socialism in Mongolia.

== 1940 Constitution ==
The second constitution, adopted on June 30, 1940, took the 1936 Soviet Constitution as the model. As Mongolian premier Khorloogiin Choibalsan reported to the Eighth National Great Hural in 1940: "We are guided in our activity by the experience of the great country of socialism, the experience of the Soviet Union. Consequently, only the constitution of the Soviet Union may be a model for us in drafting our new constitution." In subsequent revisions to the 1940 Mongolian constitution in 1944, 1949, 1952, and 1959, disparities between the Mongolian and Soviet constitutions were reduced even further.

Under the 1940 constitution, elections were restricted—"enemies of the regime" could not vote—and indirect; lower bodies elected higher levels. Constitutional amendments introduced after 1944 changed this system, however, by restoring political rights, including the right of suffrage throughout the society; by instituting a unitary hierarchy of directly elected representative bodies; by reorganizing electoral districts; by replacing voting by the show of hands at open meetings with voting by secret ballot; and by abolishing the National Little Khural— the Standing Body of the National Great Hural— transferring its functions to the National Great Khural, which was renamed People's Great Khural in 1951.

The regime's justification for making these changes was that Mongolia had already realized many sociopolitical achievements in its advance toward socialism. Therefore, it became historically correct to introduce reforms that had been adopted in the more advanced society of the Soviet Union.

== 1960 Constitution ==
The third constitution was adopted on July 6, 1960, by the People's Great Khural.

The Constitution adopted in 1960 included a lengthy preamble that acclaims the successes of the revolution and notes the importance of the "fraternal socialist assistance of the Soviet Union" to growth and development in Mongolia. The preamble clarified the dominant role of the Mongolian People's Revolutionary Party as the "guiding and directing force in society," using as its guide the "all-conquering Marxist-Leninist theory." A renewed commitment was made to completing the construction of a socialist society and culture, and eventually, to building a communist society. Enunciated foreign policy goals described a diplomacy based on the principles of peaceful coexistence and proletarian internationalism.

The points outlined in the preamble were explained more fully in the main body of the Constitution. Compared with its 1940 predecessor, the 1960 Constitution was more succinct. The 1940 document had been divided into twelve chapters. The 1960 Constitution clustered most of the same content into four general sections: socioeconomic structure, state structure, basic rights and duties of citizens, and miscellaneous provisions. Within these categories, the articles were compressed into ten chapters, compared with twelve chapters in the 1940 constitution.

In the first general section, the socialist system, rooted in the socialist ownership of national wealth and the means of production, was presented as the economic basis of society. Areas protected under law included private ownership of one's income and savings, housing, subsidiary husbandry, personal and household articles, as well as the right to an inheritance. These legal guarantees, however, were subject to the qualification that "it shall be prohibited to use the right of personal ownership to the detriment of state and social interests."

The second and longest general section defined the state structure, following that laid down in the 1940 constitution, as amended in 1959. It detailed the nature, composition, and duties of all state organs of power, including the executive, the legislative, and the judicial at both the national and local levels.

In the third general section, the fundamental rights and duties of citizens were grouped together, a departure from the previous constitutions. The rights promised in this basic law and the actual experience of Mongolians in daily life, however, were often at variance. Among the basic rights guaranteed were equality irrespective of sex, racial or national affiliations, faith, social origin, and status. These were overlooked in practice, to the extent that male Khalkha Mongols occupied most of the elite government positions, and religious practice was an impediment to career advancement in an atheistic Marxist–Leninist society. In addition, citizens were guaranteed freedom of speech, press, assembly, meeting, demonstration, and processions, but with the restriction that the activities must be practiced "in accordance with the interests of the working people and with a view to developing and strengthening the state system of the Mongolian People's Republic."

A list of duties began with the exhortation that "every citizen of the Mongolian People's Republic shall be obliged to: show dedication to the cause of building socialism; maintain the priority of the interests of society and the state vis-à-vis private interests; safeguard the concept of communal socialist property; and fulfill all civic duties, and demand the same of other citizens." Other duties involved supporting international friendship and worker solidarity "under the leadership of the Soviet Union," and teaching and practicing good social values.

The Constitution could be amended by the People's Great Hural with a majority of not less than two-thirds of the delegate votes, a system that produced frequent revision. Perhaps the most novel feature of the Constitution was contained in its concluding article, unique among socialist constitutions. Article 94 allowed the gradual repeal of the constitutional provisions: "The Constitution . . . will be repealed when the need for the existence of the state, which is the principal instrument for building socialism and communism, disappears, when it will be replaced by a communist association of working people."

== See also ==
- Constitution of Mongolia
- Mongolian People's Republic
