= 1977 Mongolian parliamentary election =

- 19 June 1977
- All 354 seats in the People's Great Khural
- Turnout: 100% (▲0.01pp)
Party	Leader	Seats	+/–
MPRP	Yumjaagiin Tsedenbal	328	+46
Non-party members	–	26	−28
This lists parties that won seats. See the complete results below.
Chairmen of the Council of Ministers before	Chairmen of the Council of Ministers after
Jambyn Batmönkh; MPRP	Jambyn Batmönkh; MPRP

Parliamentary elections were held in the Mongolian People's Republic on 19 June 1977. At the time, the country was a one-party state under the rule of the Mongolian People's Revolutionary Party (MPRP). The MPRP won 328 of the 354 seats, with the remaining 26 seats going to non-party candidates, who had been chosen by the MPRP due to their social status.

Voter turnout was reported to be 100%, with only one of the 694,855 registered voters failing to cast a ballot.

== Electoral system ==
All citizens aged at least 18 have the right to vote, with the exception of the mentally ill and persons serving a sentence pursuant to court decree. Electoral lists are established at the local district and khoroo level, and made public 30 days prior to election day.

People meeting voter requirements can be elected to all organs of state power. Public organizations, communities of working people, trade unions, youth organizations, agricultural co-operatives and cultural associations are entitled to put forward candidates to parliament. In addition to the MPRP, non-party candidates may also run. Any number of candidates may compete within a constituency. However, each district returns one deputy, who must be elected by absolute majority. In case no candidates obtain a majority, a second vote is held within two weeks. By-elections are held to fill parliamentary vacancies which occur between general elections.

== Conduct ==
A total of 1,515 polling stations were set up throughout the nation during the election. The election boards consisted of 12,814 representatives of the party, the state, and public organizations. Board representatives included 7,706 members of and candidates for the MPRP, 5,108 non-party members, and 1,785 members of the Mongolian Revolutionary Youth League, the youth wing of the MPRP.

== Results ==
All 354 nominated candidates were elected, which was interpreted as demonstration of the people's determination in implementing tasks of socialist construction advanced by the 17th Party Congress held in June 1976. The newly-elected People's Great Khural held its first session on 27 June 1977, electing Nyamyn Luvsanchultem as Chairman of the People's Great Khural and Jambyn Batmönkh as Chairman of the Council of Ministers (premier).

Party	Votes	%	Seats	+/–
Mongolian People's Revolutionary Party			328	+46
Non-party members			26	–28
Total			354	+18
Total votes	694,854	–		
Registered voters/turnout	694,855	100.00		
Source: Nohlen et al.
