= 1986 Mongolian parliamentary election =

- 22 June 1986
- All 370 seats in the People's Great Khural
- Turnout: 100%
Party	Leader	Seats	+/–
MPRP	Jambyn Batmönkh	346	+2
Non-party members	–	24	−2
This lists parties that won seats. See the complete results below.
Chairmen of the Council of Ministers before	Chairmen of the Council of Ministers after
Dumaagiin Sodnom; MPRP	Dumaagiin Sodnom; MPRP

Parliamentary elections were held in the Mongolian People's Republic on 22 June 1986. At the time, the country was a one-party state under the rule of the Mongolian People's Revolutionary Party (MPRP). The MPRP won 346 of the 370 seats, with the remaining 24 seats going to non-party candidates, who had been chosen by the MPRP due to their social status. Voter turnout was reported to be 100%, with only ten of the 929,403 registered voters failing to cast a ballot.

== Electoral system ==
All citizens aged at least 18 have the right to vote, with the exception of the mentally ill and persons serving a sentence pursuant to court decree. Electoral lists are established at the local district and khoroo level, and made public 30 days prior to election day.

People meeting voter requirements can be elected to all organs of state power. Public organizations, communities of working people, trade unions, youth organizations, agricultural co-operatives and cultural associations are entitled to put forward candidates to parliament. In addition to the MPRP, non-party candidates may also run. Any number of candidates may compete within a constituency. However, each district returns one deputy, who must be elected by absolute majority. In case no candidates obtain a majority, a second vote is held within two weeks. By-elections are held to fill parliamentary vacancies which occur between general elections.

== Conduct ==
A total of 1,586 polling stations were set up during the elections. Election boards consisted of 12,314 representatives of workers, co-operative members and intelligentsia. Board representatives included 7,483 members of and candidates for the MPRP and 4,831 non-party members. Of these, 2503 were women.

== Results ==
All 370 nominated candidates nominated were elected. The newly-elected People's Great Khural held its first session on 1 July 1986. During the session, General Secretary of the MPRP, Jambyn Batmönkh, was elected as Chairman of the Presidium of the People's Great Khural (head of state) while Bat-Ochiryn Altangerel and Dumaagiin Sodnom were re-elected as Chairman of the People's Great Khural and Chairman of the Council of Ministers (head of government), respectively.

Party	Votes	%	Seats	+/–
Mongolian People's Revolutionary Party			346	+2
Non-party members			24	–2
Total			370	0
Total votes	929,393	–		
Registered voters/turnout	929,403	100.00		
Source: Nohlen et al.
