= 1957 Mongolian parliamentary election =

- 16 June 1957
- All 233 seats in the State Great Khural
- Turnout: 99.99% (▲0.01pp)
Party	Leader	Seats	+/–
MPRP	Dashiin Damba	178	−14
Non-party members	–	55	−48
This lists parties that won seats. See the complete results below.
Chairmen of the Council of Ministers before	Chairmen of the Council of Ministers after
Yumjaagiin Tsedenbal; MPRP	Yumjaagiin Tsedenbal; MPRP

Parliamentary elections were held in the Mongolian People's Republic on 16 June 1957. At the time, the country was a one-party state under the rule of the Mongolian People's Revolutionary Party (MPRP). The MPRP won 178 of the 233 seats, with the remaining 55 seats going to non-party candidates, who had been chosen by the MPRP due to their social status. Voter turnout was reported to be 99.99%, with only 32 registered voters failing to cast a ballot.

== Results ==
Party	Votes	%	Seats	+/–
Mongolian People's Revolutionary Party			178	–14
Non-party members			55	–48
Total			233	–62
Total votes	509,494	–		
Registered voters/turnout	509,526	99.99		
Source: Nohlen et al.
