= 1969 Mongolian parliamentary election =

- 22 June 1969
- All 297 seats in the People's Great Khural
- Turnout: 100%
Party	Leader	Seats	+/–
MPRP	Yumjaagiin Tsedenbal	252	+18
Non-party members	–	45	−8
This lists parties that won seats. See the complete results below.
Chairmen of the Council of Ministers before	Chairmen of the Council of Ministers after
Yumjaagiin Tsedenbal; MPRP	Yumjaagiin Tsedenbal; MPRP

Parliamentary elections were held in the Mongolian People's Republic on 22 June 1969. At the time, the country was a one-party state under the rule of the Mongolian People's Revolutionary Party (MPRP). The MPRP won 252 of the 297 seats, with the remaining 45 seats going to non-party candidates, who had been chosen by the MPRP due to their social status. Voter turnout was reported to be 100%, with only 15 registered voters failing to cast a ballot.

== Results ==
Party	Votes	%	Seats	+/–
Mongolian People's Revolutionary Party			252	+18
Non-party members			45	–8
Total			297	+10
Total votes	577,709	–		
Registered voters/turnout	577,724	100.00		
Source: Nohlen et al.
