= 1966 Mongolian parliamentary election =

- 26 June 1966
- All 287 seats in the People's Great Khural
- Turnout: 100%
| Party | Leader | Seats | +/– |
|---|---|---|---|
| MPRP | Yumjaagiin Tsedenbal | 234 | +18 |
| Non-party members | – | 53 | −1 |
This lists parties that won seats. See the complete results below.
| Chairmen of the Council of Ministers before | Chairmen of the Council of Ministers after |
|---|---|
| Yumjaagiin Tsedenbal; MPRP | Yumjaagiin Tsedenbal; MPRP |

Parliamentary elections were held in the Mongolian People's Republic on 26 June 1966. At the time, the country was a one-party state under the rule of the Mongolian People's Revolutionary Party (MPRP). The MPRP won 234 of the 287 seats, with the remaining 53 seats going to non-party candidates, who had been chosen by the MPRP due to their social status. Voter turnout was reported to be 100%, with only 14 registered voters failing to cast a ballot.

== Results ==
| Party | Votes | % | Seats | +/– |
|---|---|---|---|---|
| Mongolian People's Revolutionary Party | | | 234 | +18 |
| Non-party members | | | 53 | –1 |
| Total | | | 287 | +17 |
| Total votes | 558,463 | – | | |
| Registered voters/turnout | 558,477 | 100.00 | | |
Source: Nohlen et al.
