= 1981 Mongolian parliamentary election =

- 21 June 1981
- All 370 seats in the People's Great Khural
- Turnout: 100%
Party	Leader	Seats	+/–
MPRP	Yumjaagiin Tsedenbal	344	+16
Non-party members	–	26	0
This lists parties that won seats. See the complete results below.
Chairmen of the Council of Ministers before	Chairmen of the Council of Ministers after
Jambyn Batmönkh; MPRP	Jambyn Batmönkh; MPRP

Parliamentary elections were held in the Mongolian People's Republic on 21 June 1981. At the time, the country was a one-party state under the rule of the Mongolian People's Revolutionary Party (MPRP). The MPRP won 344 of the 370 seats, with the remaining 26 seats going to non-party candidates, who had been chosen by the MPRP due to their social status. Voter turnout was reported to be 100%, with only five of the 792,896 registered voters failing to cast a ballot.

Party	Votes	%	Seats	+/–
Mongolian People's Revolutionary Party			344	+16
Non-party members			26	0
Total			370	+16
Total votes	792,891	–		
Registered voters/turnout	792,896	100.00		
Source: Nohlen et al.
