= 1960 Mongolian parliamentary election =

- 19 June 1960
- All 267 seats in the People's Great Khural
- Turnout: 99.98% (▼0.01pp)
Party	Leader	Seats	+/–
MPRP	Yumjaagiin Tsedenbal	207	+29
Non-party members	–	60	+5
This lists parties that won seats. See the complete results below.
Chairmen of the Council of Ministers before	Chairmen of the Council of Ministers after
Yumjaagiin Tsedenbal; MPRP	Yumjaagiin Tsedenbal; MPRP

Parliamentary elections were held in the Mongolian People's Republic on 19 June 1960. At the time, the country was a one-party state under the rule of the Mongolian People's Revolutionary Party (MPRP). The MPRP won 207 of the 267 seats, with the remaining 60 seats going to non-party candidates, who had been chosen by the MPRP due to their social status. Voter turnout was reported to be 99.98%, with only 83 registered voters failing to cast a ballot.

== Results ==
Party	Votes	%	Seats	+/–
Mongolian People's Revolutionary Party			207	+29
Non-party members			60	+5
Total			267	+34
Total votes	525,940	–		
Registered voters/turnout	526,023	99.98		
Source: Nohlen et al.
