= 1954 Mongolian parliamentary election =

- 13 June 1954
- All 295 seats in the State Great Khural
- Turnout: 99.98% (▲0.05pp)
Party	Leader	Seats	+/–
MPRP	Dashiin Damba	192	+16
Non-party members	–	103	−15
This lists parties that won seats. See the complete results below.
Chairmen of the Council of Ministers before	Chairmen of the Council of Ministers after
Yumjaagiin Tsedenbal; MPRP	Yumjaagiin Tsedenbal; MPRP

Parliamentary elections were held in the Mongolian People's Republic on 13 June 1954. At the time, the country was a one-party state under the rule of the Mongolian People's Revolutionary Party (MPRP). The MPRP won 192 of the 295 seats, with the remaining 103 seats going to non-party candidates, who had been chosen by the MPRP due to their social status. Voter turnout was reported to be 99.98%, with only 97 voters failing to cast a ballot.

== Results ==
Party	Votes	%	Seats	+/–
Mongolian People's Revolutionary Party			192	+16
Non-party members			103	–15
Total			295	+1
Total votes	494,793	–		
Registered voters/turnout	494,890	99.98		
Source: Nohlen et al.
