= 1973 Mongolian parliamentary election =

- 24 June 1973
- All 336 seats in the People's Great Khural
- Turnout: 99.99% (▼0.01pp)
Party	Leader	Seats	+/–
MPRP	Yumjaagiin Tsedenbal	282	+30
Non-party members	–	54	+9
This lists parties that won seats. See the complete results below.
Chairmen of the Council of Ministers before	Chairmen of the Council of Ministers after
Yumjaagiin Tsedenbal; MPRP	Yumjaagiin Tsedenbal; MPRP

Parliamentary elections were held in the Mongolian People's Republic on 24 June 1973. At the time, the country was a one-party state under the rule of the Mongolian People's Revolutionary Party (MPRP). The MPRP won 282 of the 336 seats, with the remaining 54 seats going to non-party candidates, who had been chosen by the MPRP due to their social status. Voter turnout was reported to be 99.99%, with only 39 registered voters failing to cast a ballot.

== Electoral system ==
All citizens aged at least 18 have the right to vote, with the exception of the mentally ill and persons serving a sentence pursuant to court decree. Electoral lists are established at the local district and khoroo level, and made public 30 days prior to election day.

People meeting voter requirements can be elected to all organs of state power. Public organizations, communities of working people, trade unions, youth organizations, agricultural co-operatives and cultural associations are entitled to put forward candidates to parliament. In addition to the MPRP, non-party candidates may also run. Any number of candidates may compete within a constituency. However, each district returns one deputy, who must be elected by absolute majority. In case no candidates obtain a majority, a second vote is held within two weeks. By-elections are held to fill parliamentary vacancies which occur between general elections.

== Conduct ==
First meeting for the Central Electoral Commission was held on 10 May 1973. Its chairman emphasized that the elections would reflect further development of socialist democracy and be an important event in mobilizing all workers' collectives for the early implementation of the planned assignments of 1973, the decisive year of the current five-year plan.

In preparation for electing the 8th People's Great Khural, nominating conventions were held on 12 May 1973, at a number of industrial enterprises in Ulaanbaatar and in the provinces.

== Results ==
Party	Votes	%	Seats	+/–
Mongolian People's Revolutionary Party			282	+30
Non-party members			54	+9
Total			336	+39
Total votes	622,149	–		
Registered voters/turnout	622,188	99.99		
Source: Nohlen et al.
