= 1963 Mongolian parliamentary election =

- 9 June 1963
- All 270 seats in the People's Great Khural
- Turnout: 100% (▲0.02pp)
Party	Leader	Seats	+/–
MPRP	Yumjaagiin Tsedenbal	216	+9
Non-party members	–	54	−6
This lists parties that won seats. See the complete results below.
Chairmen of the Council of Ministers before	Chairmen of the Council of Ministers after
Yumjaagiin Tsedenbal; MPRP	Yumjaagiin Tsedenbal; MPRP

Parliamentary elections were held in the Mongolian People's Republic on 9 June 1963. At the time, the country was a one-party state under the rule of the Mongolian People's Revolutionary Party (MPRP). The MPRP won 216 of the 270 seats, with the remaining 54 seats going to non-party candidates, who had been chosen by the MPRP due to their social status. Voter turnout was reported to be 100%, with only 13 registered voters failing to cast a ballot.

== Results ==
Party	Votes	%	Seats	+/–
Mongolian People's Revolutionary Party			216	+9
Non-party members			54	–6
Total			270	+3
Total votes	543,518	–		
Registered voters/turnout	543,531	100.00		
Source: Nohlen et al.
