= 1951 Mongolian parliamentary election =

- 10 June 1951
- All 294 seats in the State Great Khural
- Turnout: 99.93%
Party	Leader	Seats
MPRP	Yumjaagiin Tsedenbal	176
Non-party members	–	118
This lists parties that won seats. See the complete results below.
Chairmen of the Council of Ministers before	Chairmen of the Council of Ministers after
Khorloogiin Choibalsan; MPRP	Khorloogiin Choibalsan; MPRP

Parliamentary elections were held in the Mongolian People's Republic on 10 June 1951. At the time, the country was a one-party state under the rule of the Mongolian People's Revolutionary Party (MPRP). The MPRP won 176 of the 294 seats, with the remaining 118 seats going to non-party candidates, who had been chosen by the MPRP due to their social status. Voter turnout was reported to be 99.93%.

== Results ==
Party	Votes	%	Seats
Mongolian People's Revolutionary Party			176
Non-party members			118
Total			294
Total votes	489,031	–	
Registered voters/turnout	489,377	99.93	
Source: Nohlen et al.
