= People's Great Khural =

Highest organ of state authority of the Mongolian People's Republic

People's Great Khural Ардын Их Хурал ᠠᠷᠠᠳ ᠤᠨ ᠶᠡᠬᠡ ᠬᠤᠷᠠᠯ
- Mongolian People's Republic
- State emblem

Type
- Type: Unicameral (Note: Upper house of bicameral legislature since March 1990)

History
- Founded: 10 June 1951; 75 years ago
- Disbanded: 20 July 1992; 34 years ago
- Preceded by: Great Khural; Little Khural
- Succeeded by: State Great Khural

Leadership
- Chairman of the Presidium: Gonchigiin Bumtsend (first); Punsalmaagiin Ochirbat (last)
- Chairman: Dashiin Damba (first); Jambaldorjiin Urtnasan (last)

Structure
- Seats: 294–430
- Political groups: MPRP (357); MDP (16); MRYL (9); MNPP (6); MSDP (4); Independents (38); MPRP (176); Non-party (118)

Elections
- Voting system: Direct election
- First election: 10 June 1951
- Last election: 29 July 1990

Meeting place
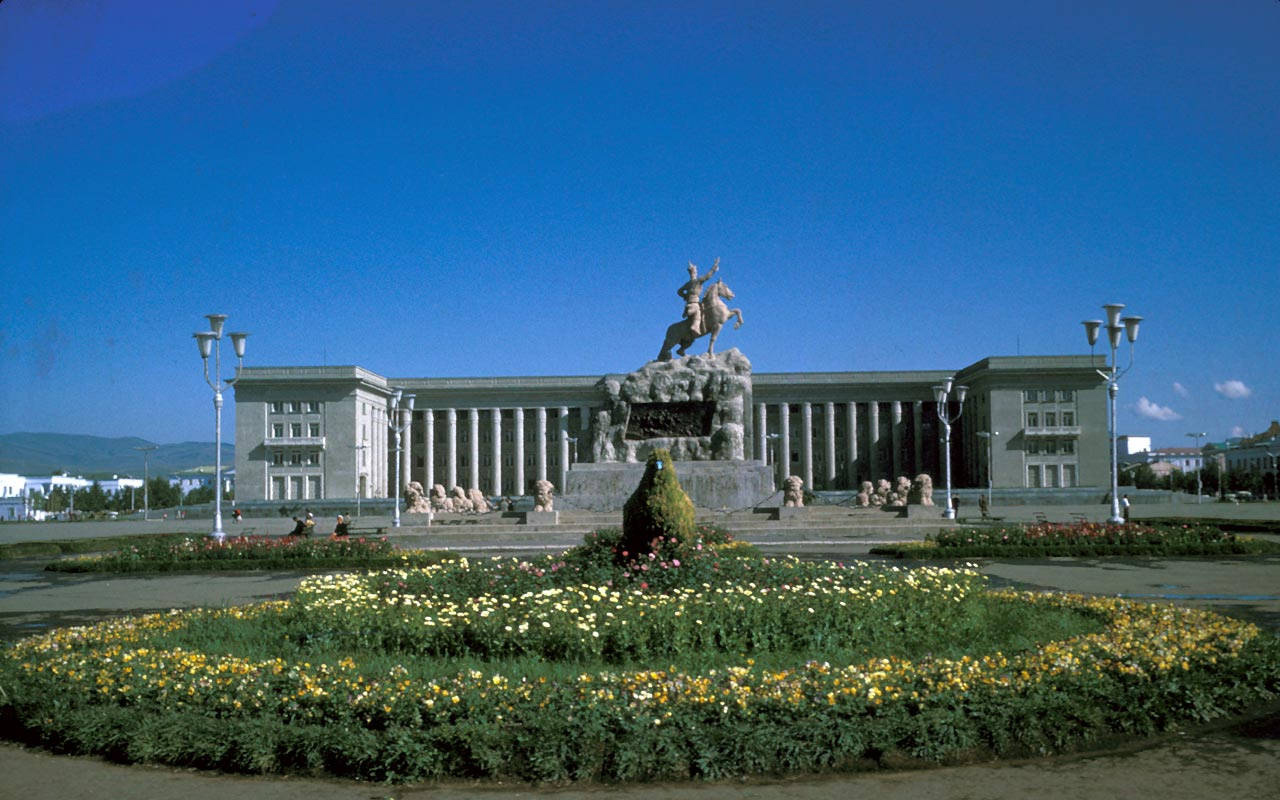
- Government Palace, Ulaanbaatar

Constitution
- Constitution of the Mongolian People's Republic

Footnotes
- State Great Khural; Улсын Их Хурал (1951–1960)

The People's Great Khural, (Note: Mongolian: Ардын Их Хурал (АИХ), romanized: Ardyn Ikh Khural (AIKh) lit. 'People's Great Assembly') or People's Grand Khural, was the highest organ of state authority of the Mongolian People's Republic from 1951 to 1992. Based on the Marxist–Leninist principle of unified power, it was the only branch of government and headed the unified state apparatus, similar to that of the Soviet Union. The body was formerly known as the State Great Khural (Note: Mongolian: Улсын Их Хурал, romanized: Ulsyn Ikh Khural (UIKh) lit. 'State Great Assembly') before its name change following the adoption of the 1960 Constitution.

The People's Great Khural appointed the Council of Ministers, the Supreme Court, and the State Prosecutor of the Mongolian People's Republic, as well as elected the Presidium whose chairman served as Mongolia's head of state under the 1940 and 1960 Constitutions.

Under the 1960 Constitution, the People's Great Khural was defined as the supreme state organ of power in the MPR and was imbued with great lawmaking powers. In practice, however, it was a rubber-stamp parliament that did little more than ratify decisions already made by the MPR's executive organs and the Mongolian People's Revolutionary Party.

Prior to 1951, the State Little Khural was the highest organ of state authority until its dissolution in 1951 following a series of constitutional amendments. This body, however, would be re-established as a standing legislature and lower house of the People's Great Khural in the aftermath of the 1990 Democratic Revolution, acting as the main legislative body from 1990 to 1992. The short-lived bicameral assemblies were dissolved and succeeded by the unicameral State Great Khural in 1992 after the ratification of a new constitution and the 1992 parliamentary election.

== History ==
The People's Great Khural was the highest legislative body in the Mongolian People's Republic (MPR) from 1951 to 1992. Prior to 1951, the MPR had a bicameral legislature, the State Little Khural (Mongolian: Улсын Бага Хурал) and State Great Khural (Mongolian: Улсын Их Хурал).

Following the radical constitutional revisions of 1949, which refashioned the State structure of the MPR along Soviet lines, the principle of democratic centralism was recognized as the central concept governing the functioning of the administrative apparatus, just as in the USSR.

In 1952, the Constitution of the MPR was further amended to follow its Soviet model. Before the 1952 amendment, the constitution provided for a Little Khural, which was elected by the People’s Great Khural and acted for it when it was not in session. This was similar to the Congress of Soviets (Great Khural), which elected a Central Executive Committee (Little Khural). The 1952 amendment provided that the Great Khural was to meet every year, not every three years as before, and hence there was no justification for a Little Khural, which had met annually. The Little Khural was dissolved, and the Great Khural succeeded and functioned as the nominal supreme organ of state power according to the amended 1940 Mongolian Constitution. The size of the Presidium - seven members - was kept the same, with a chairman, a deputy chairman, a secretary, and four other presidium members. This streamlining followed a broader trend in 1952, when the organization of the Communist Party of the Soviet Union was simplified by merging the Politburo and Orgburo into a Presidium and eliminating the Party Conference of the USSR. The Council of Ministers, a body responsible to the Great Khural or, between sessions, to its Presidium, had its duties unchanged.

In 1960, a new constitution was ratified. The 1960 Constitution outlined a new state government structure different from that of 1940 and renamed the State Great Khural the People's Great Khural. The People's Great Khural, similar to the Supreme Soviet of the USSR, was theoretically the highest authority in the MPR, but in practice it usually rubber-stamped decisions made by the MPRP and the Politburo.

In the aftermath of the 1990 Democratic Revolution, the People's Great Khural became a more genuine parliamentary body following a series of amendments to the constitution in mid 1990. A new, smaller working legislature, called the State Little Khural, was established and elected from the People's Great Khural after the June 1990 elections, transferring most of its executive and legislative powers to the Little Khural. Between late 1990 and 1992, the Great Khural acted as a representative body, with its last session being held in late 1991, months before the convention of the unicameral State Great Khural.

== Functions ==
The People's Great Khural had authority to:

- Ratify and enact laws, legislations.
- Amend the Constitution of the Mongolian People's Republic with two-thirds majority.
- Elect a chairman (speaker), and four deputy chairmans.
- Elect the Presidium of the People's Great Khural, which acted as a collective head of state between sessions.
- Select standing committees (budget, legislative proposals, nationality affairs, and foreign affairs).
- Appoint the Council of Ministers (executive branch).
- Confirm ministerial appointments.
- Ratify international treaties and approve economic plans.
- Establish foreign and domestic affairs, and decide "questions of peace and defense of the socialist motherland."

The Great Khural usually meets two to three times annually to receive reports from the Council of Ministers and to enact laws. While its not in session, the Presidium carries the duties of the People's Great Khural. Despite the Khural's extensive legislative power and authority, in practice, much of its powers were exercised regularly by relevant ministries and the chairman of the Presidium.

The Presidium was the highest agency of state power. Its principal powers included the formation, abolition, and reorganization of government ministries; appointment of ministers and ambassadors; ratification or denunciation of international treaties and agreements; and award of military and other tides and ranks. The Presidium also participates in the regular powers accorded to the People's Great Hural.

=== Deputies ===
Terms of Great Khural deputies varied from three to four years. From 1951 to 1969, deputies served a three-year renewable term, while from 1969 to 1990, the term was four-years, renewable. Deputies had special protection in that they may not be arrested or brought to trial without the consent of the Great Khural or the Presidium.

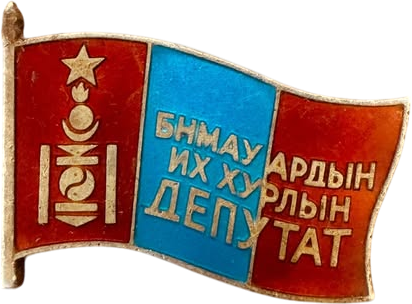
Badge of a deputy to the People's Great Khural of the MPR.

Since 1951, election candidates were proposed by trade unions, farm organizations, youth and party organizations, and other mass organizations. Registered voters had the ability to vote for a single registered candidate by placing an unmarked ballot bearing the candidate's name in the ballot box. To vote against a candidate, an elector had to strike the name from the ballot.

== Elections ==
=== Prior 1951 ===
In 1944, the Mongolian People's Republic, through a decree of the Presidium of the Little Khural, amended Article 71 to grant electoral rights to all, except "the insane and persons deprived of political rights by the court." Voting until 1949 was on a viva voce basis. While the Soviet constitution of 1936 introduced the secret ballot and direct elections, the 1940 Mongolian law provided for open ballots and indirect elections to the Great Khural until the 1949 amendments. Members of the Great Khural were elected from the aimag and urban khurals. These khurals were, in turn, elected by the sum khurals and the latter by the bag khurals. This method of indirect election was similar to the system of village, district, provincial, and national levels under the Soviet Constitution of 1918.

The IX Great Khural in February 1949 amended the constitution to introduce electoral reforms, secret ballots, and universal suffrage. All organs of state power were renamed the Khurals of Workers' Deputies, and direct elections to the Great Khural were introduced, with one deputy for every 2,500 people, up from the previous one for every 1,500 people. The system used to nominate candidates for the Great Khural elections is similar to that used in the USSR. According to Article 86 of the Mongolian Constitution, candidates are nominated by electoral districts, and the right to nominate candidates is ensured for social organizations and societies of workers: national revolutionary party organizations, cooperative and professional unions, youth organizations, arat unions, and cultural societies.

=== Post 1951 ===
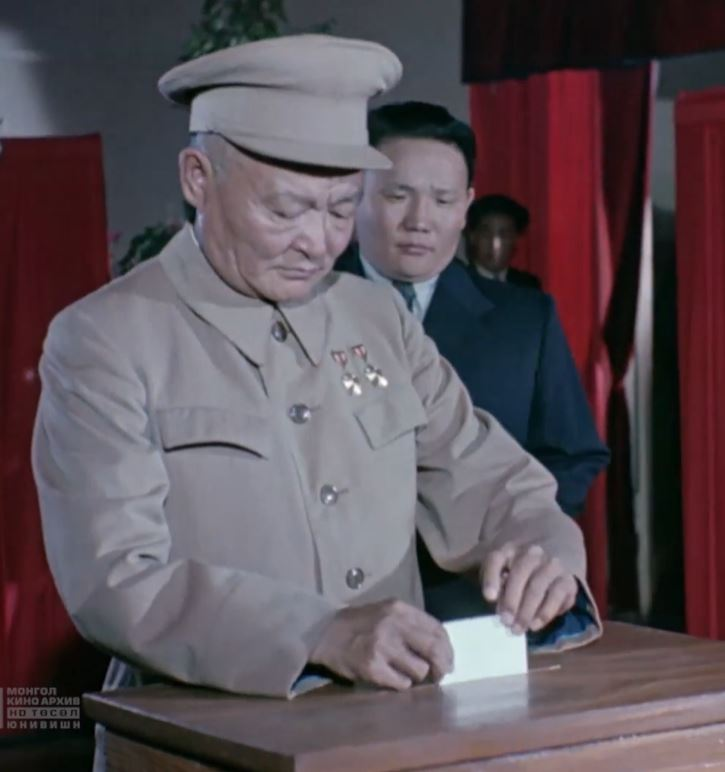
Khorloogiin Choibalsan (right) and Yumjaagiin Tsedenbal (left) voting for the First People's Great Khural in the 1951 legislative election.

The first direct elections to the Great Khural were held on 10 June 1951, in which 295 deputies were elected, with an election turnout of 99%. To vote in an election, the 1960 Constitution stated that all Mongolian citizens older than 18 years are eligible to vote in a secret ballot. The term of the elected People's Great Khural was outlined to be five years, but in reality, it varied from year to year. Between 1951 and 1969, deputies to the People's Great Khural were elected for three-year terms. It was extended to four years since 1969 and five years since 1981.

Chapter 3 of the 1960 Constitution stipulated that the People's Great Khural of the MPR shall elect one deputy from each local city other than the provincial capital, and one deputy for every 10,000 people in the provincial capitals and cities under state jurisdiction. It was also outlined that the People's Great Khural was to regularly convene once per annum and also convene an extraordinary session at the initiative of the Presidium of the People's Great Khural or at the request of at least one-third of the deputies.

Election	Session	Turnout	Distribution of seats		Total
Election	Session	Turnout	MPRP	Non-party	Total
1951	I	99.93%	176 / 294	118 / 294	294
1954	II	99.98%	192 / 295	103 / 295	295
1957	III	99.99%	178 / 233	55 / 233	233
1960	IV	99.98%	207 / 267	60 / 267	267
1963	V	100.00%	216 / 270	54 / 270	270
1966	VI	100.00%	234 / 287	53 / 287	287
1969	VII	100.00%	252 / 297	45 / 297	297
1973	VIII	99.99%	282 / 336	54 / 336	336
1977	IX	100.00%	328 / 354	26 / 354	354
1981	X	100.00%	344 / 370	26 / 370	370
1986	XI	100.00%	346 / 370	24 / 370	370
Source: Nohlen et el., Mongolia: a country study

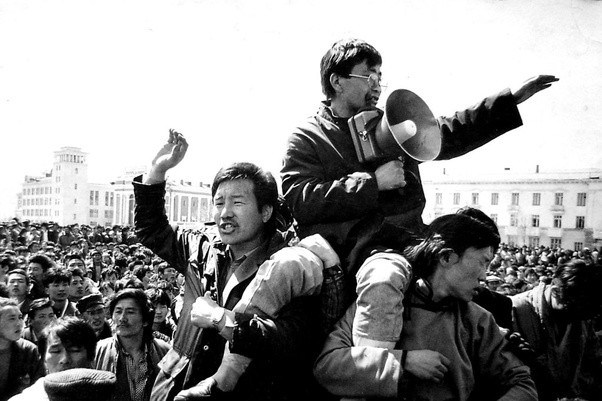
Pro-democracy demonstrations organized by Sanjaasürengiin Zorig at the Sükhbaatar Square, early March 1990.

During the Democratic Revolution of 1990, the entire Politburo of the MPRP resigned according to the protestors' demands. Subsequently, the People's Great Khural convened a special session on 21 March 1990, elected Punsalmaagiin Ochirbat (MPRP) as its chairman, and appointed Sharavyn Gungaadorj (MPRP) as premier. On 21–23 March 1990, during the legislature's extraordinary session, the constitutional provision granting the MPRP the leading role in the state was removed, officially ending 70 years of one-party rule. Further constitutional amendments were made in May 1990 to organize multi-party elections and the political system with a president and parliament elected by the People's Great Khural instead of the presidium. Mongolia's first free and fair election was held in July 1990, with the disposition of parties as follows:

Party	Acronym	People's Great Khural	State Little Khural
Mongolian People's Revolutionary Party	MPRP; МАХН	357 / 430	31 / 50
Mongolian Democratic Party	MDP; МоАН	16 / 430	13 / 50
Mongolian Revolutionary Youth League	MRYL; МХЗЭ	9 / 430	–
Mongolian National Progress Party	MNPP; МҮДН	6 / 430	3 / 50
Mongolian Social Democratic Party	MSDP; МСДН	4 / 430	3 / 50
Independents	–	38 / 430	–
Total		430	50
Source: Nohlen et el., GEC, IPU

In September 1990, during the XII People's Great Khural's plenary session, the legislature elected incumbent Punsalmaagiin Ochirbat (MPRP) as the President of the MPR; Jambyn Gombojav (MPRP) as the succeeding chairman of the People's Great Khural; Dashiin Byambasüren (MPRP) as the prime minister; Radnaasümbereliin Gonchigdorj (MSDP) as the vice president and chairman of the State Little Khural; and the 50 lower house deputies from the Great Khural's 430 deputies.

== Structure ==
=== Chairman of the Presidium ===
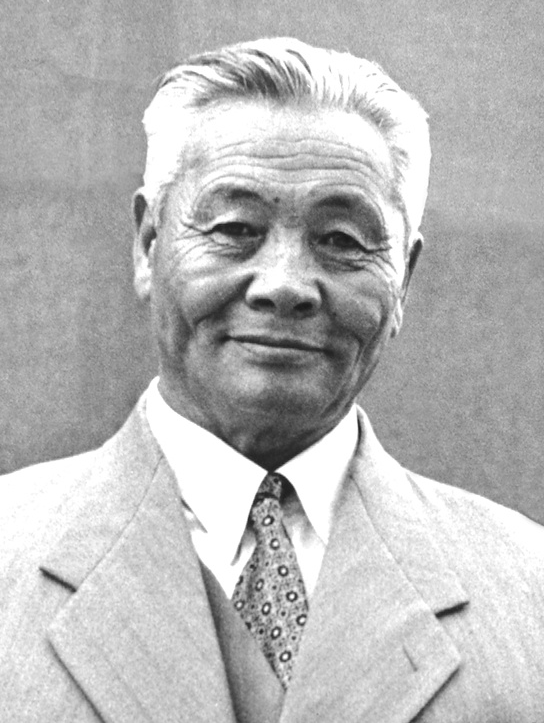
Jamsrangiin Sambuu was the longest-serving chairman of the Presidium of the People's Great Khural, serving from 1954 until his death in 1972.

According to the constitution, the chairman of the Presidium of the People's Great Khural was also the head of state of the MPR. From 1951 to 1960, the official title was "chairman of the Presidium of the State Great Khural. After the adoption of the 1960 Constitution, the official title changed to chairman of the Presidium of the People's Great Khural following the name change of the State Great Khural to the People's Great Khural. The Presidium usually consisted of its chairman, deputy chairmen, secretary general, and presidium members.

Name	Entered office	Left office	Party
Gonchigiin Bumtsend	6 July 1951	23 September 1953 †	MPRP
Sükhbaataryn Yanjmaa*	23 September 1953	7 July 1954	MPRP
Jamsrangiin Sambuu	7 July 1954	21 May 1972 †	MPRP
Tsagaanlamyn Dügersüren*	21 May 1972	29 June 1972	MPRP
Sonomyn Luvsan*	29 June 1972	11 June 1974	MPRP
Yumjaagiin Tsedenbal	11 June 1974	23 August 1984	MPRP
Nyamyn Jagvaral*	23 August 1984	12 December 1984	MPRP
Jambyn Batmönkh	12 December 1984	21 March 1990	MPRP
Punsalmaagiin Ochirbat	21 March 1990	3 September 1990	MPRP

=== Chairman ===
The Chairman of the People's Great Khural, referred to as Chairman of the State Great Khural from 1951 to 1960, was the presiding officer of the legislature. Dashiin Damba was elected the first chairman of the assembly in 1951 while Jambaldorjiin Urtnasan served as the last chairman from 1991 to 1992. Between 1951 and 1992, eleven men—Dashiin Damba, Chimeddorjiin Surenjav, Bayaryn Jargalsaikhan, Luvsantserengiin Tsend, Dondogiin Tsevegmed, Tsagaanlamyn Dügersüren, Nyamyn Luvsanchultem, Bat-Ochiryn Altangerel, Lodongiin Rinchin, Jambyn Gombojav, and Jambaldorjiin Urtnasan (not chronological order)—served as chairman.

== Results ==
=== 1951 Mongolian People's Great Khural election (first) ===
Party	Votes	%	Seats
Mongolian People's Revolutionary Party			176
Non-party members			118
Total			294
Total votes	489,031	–	
Registered voters/turnout	489,377	99.93	
Source: Nohlen et al.

=== 1990 Mongolian People's Great Khural election (last) ===
Party	Votes	%	Seats	+/–
Mongolian People's Revolutionary Party			357	+11
Mongolian Democratic Party			16	New
Mongolian Revolutionary Youth League			9	New
Mongolian National Progress Party			6	New
Mongolian Social Democratic Party			4	New
Mongolian Green Party			0	New
Mongolian Free Labour Party			0	New
Independents			38	–
Total			430	+60
Total votes	1,005,629	–		
Registered voters/turnout	1,027,277	97.89		
Source: Nohlen et al., GEC

== See also ==
- Mongolian People's Republic
- Constitutions of the Mongolian People's Republic
- Little Khural
