= Mongolian People's Party =

Political party in Mongolia

Mongolian People's Party Монгол Ардын Нам ᠮᠣᠩᠭᠣᠯ ᠠᠷᠠᠳ ‍ᠤᠨ ᠨᠠᠮ
- Abbreviation: MPP (English); МАН (Mongolian)
- Chairperson: Nyam-Osoryn Uchral
- Secretary-General: Sodbaatar Yangug
- Founders: See list: Dogsomyn Bodoo; Soliin Danzan; Damdiny Sükhbaatar; Khorloogiin Choibalsan; Darizavyn Losol; Dansranbilegiin Dogsom; Dambyn Chagdarjav
- Founded: 25 June 1920; 106 years ago
- Headquarters: Ulaanbaatar
- Newspaper: Mongolyn Ünen ('Mongolian Truth')
- Student wing: Social Democratic Mongolian Student's Union
- Youth wing: Social Democratic Youth's Union
- Women's wing: Social Democratic Mongolian Women's Union
- Armed wing: Mongolian People's Army (1921–1992)
- Membership (2023): ▲287,283
- Ideology: Social democracy (Note: 1920–1990: Communism; Marxism–Leninism; 1928–1956: Stalinism; 1990–2010: Democratic socialism)
- Political position: Centre-left (Note: 1920–1990: Far-left; 1990–2010: Left-wing)
- Regional affiliation: Network of Social Democracy in Asia
- International affiliation: Comintern (1924–1943); Socialist International (since 2003); Progressive Alliance
- Colors: Red
- State Great Khural: 68 / 126
- Provincial Governors: 14 / 21
- Ulaanbaatar District Governors: 8 / 9

Party flag

Website
- mpp.mn
- Politics of Mongolia; Political parties; Elections; Formerly: Mongolian People's Revolutionary Party; Монгол Ардын Хувьсгалт Нам (1924–2010)

The Mongolian People's Party (Note: Mongolian: Монгол Ардын Нам, romanized: Mongol Ardiin Nam, pronounced [mɔ́ɴɢəɮ artíːɴ nam]; In the Mongolian script: ᠮᠣᠩᠭᠣᠯ ᠠᠷᠠᠳ ‍ᠤᠨ ᠨᠠᠮ) (MPP) (Note: Mongolian: МАН, romanized: MAN, pronounced [e̝m‿a‿e̝ɴ]) is a social democratic political party in Mongolia. It was founded as a communist party in 1920 by Mongolian revolutionaries and is the oldest political party in Mongolia.

The party played an important role in the Mongolian Revolution of 1921, which was inspired by the Bolsheviks' October Revolution. The revolutionaries' victory resulted in the establishment of the socialist Mongolian People's Republic and the party becoming the sole ruling party of the country. The party changed its name to the Mongolian People's Revolutionary Party (Note: Mongolian: Монгол Ардын Хувьсгалт Нам, romanized: Mongol Ardiin Khuvisgalt Nam, pronounced [mɔ́ɴɢəɮ artíːɴ χʉ́wsʁəɮtʰ nam]; In the Mongolian script: ᠮᠣᠩᠭᠣᠯ ᠠᠷᠠᠳ ᠤᠨ ᠬᠤᠪᠢᠰᠬᠠᠯᠲᠤ ᠨᠠᠮ) (MPRP) (Note: Mongolian: МАХН, romanized: MAKhN, pronounced [e̝m‿a‿χa‿e̝ɴ]) and joined the Communist International in 1924.

As the MPRP, the party was organized on the basis of Vladimir Lenin's principle of democratic centralism. The highest body of the party was the Party Congress, convened every fifth year. When the Party Congress was not in session, the Central Committee was the highest body, but since they met normally only once a year, most duties and responsibilities were vested in the Politburo and its Standing Committee. The party's leader was titled General Secretary or First Secretary during the period; today, it is led by a Chairperson. The party previously followed Marxism-Leninism, a synthesis of the ideas of Karl Marx and Lenin introduced by Joseph Stalin in 1929, under which the industries of Mongolia were nationalized and a planned economy was implemented.

Following the Mongolian Revolution of 1990, other political parties in Mongolia were legalised and the country transitioned into a multi-party democracy. The party subsequently abandoned Marxism–Leninism in favour of democratic socialism. In 2010, party members voted to adopt social democracy as the party's ideology and restore the party's original name, dropping the word "revolutionary". This caused a faction to split away and form a new party to retain the long-standing name; the two parties reunited in 2021.

The party remained as Mongolia's governing party after the 1990 revolution, until it was defeated in the 1996 election. From 2004 to 2008, it was a part of a coalition government with the Democratic Party and Motherland Party. From 2008 to 2012, the party participated in another coalition with the Democratic Party, although it had a majority in the Mongolian legislature. It became the main opposition party after the 2012 election. The party returned to power following the 2016 election and retained its majority in the 2020 and 2024 elections.

== History ==
=== Background ===
In 1911, Outer Mongolia declared its independence from the Qing dynasty after over two centuries of Qing rule. However, the independence of the Bogd Khanate did not last since it was not recognized by its two neighbors (Russia and China) and was considered an autonomous region under Chinese sovereignty or suzerainty. In 1919, Mongolia was invaded by the Chinese Beiyang government and by White Russian forces in 1921.

=== 1921 revolution ===
During the occupation, two groups, known as the Consular Hill (Mongolian: Консулын дэнж, romanized: Konsulyn denj) and East Khuree (Mongolian: Зүүн хүрээ, romanized: Züün khüree), formed as underground resistance movements. Members of the Consular Hill included Dogsomyn Bodoo, Khorloogiin Choibalsan, Dambyn Chagdarjav, Darizavyn Losol, whilst the East Khuree included Soliin Danzan, Dansranbilegiin Dogsom, and Damdiny Sükhbaatar. These founding revolutionaries came to be known as the "First Seven" (Mongolian: Анхны долоо, romanized: Ankhnii doloo).

On 25 June 1920, the two groups united as the Mongolian People's Party and sent Danzan and Choibalsan as representatives to the Soviet Union, who met with Soviet representatives in Irkutsk in August. On 1 March 1921, the party was founded in Kyakhta (claiming to be Mongolia's first political party) and formed the People's Provisional Government.

On 18 March, the Mongolian People's Militia under Damdiny Sükhbaatar defeated Chinese forces and took Kyakhta. In May, the White Russian Baron Ungern brought his forces north from Ikh Khuree and was defeated by joint Mongolian Guerrilla Army and Red Army forces. On 25 June 1921, the Mongolian People’s Party issued a statement to all Mongolians about its decision to liberate the capital by force. The forces entered the capital on 6 July and declared independence on 11 July. Following advice from the Communist International, the party renamed itself the Mongolian People's Revolutionary Party in 1924.

=== Armed uprising and purges ===
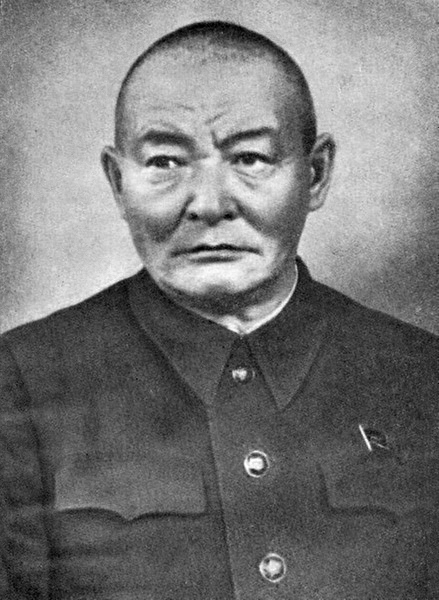
Marshal of the Mongolian People's Republic Khorloogiin Choibalsan

In 1928, Mongolian politics turned sharply left and began to adhere to communist ideology. Livestock herds were forcibly collectivized, private trade and transport were forbidden, and monasteries and the nobility were attacked. With state-run trade and transport unable to function, Mongolia's economy broke down—over seven million head of livestock died, leading to widespread unrest in 1932. The uprising was quelled in October after the involvement of Mongolian and Soviet armies, tanks, and planes.

The first wave of purges began with the 1933 Lkhümbe Affair, a manufactured conspiracy linking party secretary Jambyn Lkhümbe with Japanese spy networks. Over 1,500 people were purged, many of whom were executed. Victims included Prime Minister Peljidiin Genden, who was enthusiastic about the liberalisation of the economy and hesitant in suppressing Buddhism in Mongolia. In 1936, Genden was removed from power and executed in the Soviet Union. Khorloogiin Choibalsan, a staunch ally of Joseph Stalin, gained power.

A five-pointed red or sometimes golden star was used as the emblem of the MPRP from the 1930s to early 1990

Between 1937 and 1939, a second wave of purges began, with 25,437 people officially arrested and 20,099 executed. The actual number of victims has been estimated at over 35,000 to 100,000. Over 18,000 were lamas, resulting in the virtual destruction of the Buddhist clergy. Between 1940 and 1955, those who were complicit in the earlier purges were themselves purged.

Under Choibalsan's rule, improvements in Mongolia's infrastructure, roads and communications were made with Soviet assistance and steps were taken to improve the country's literacy rate. The 11th party congress was held in December 1947, approving Mongolia's first five-year plan to intensify development of the economy, industry, animal husbandry and agriculture in stages.

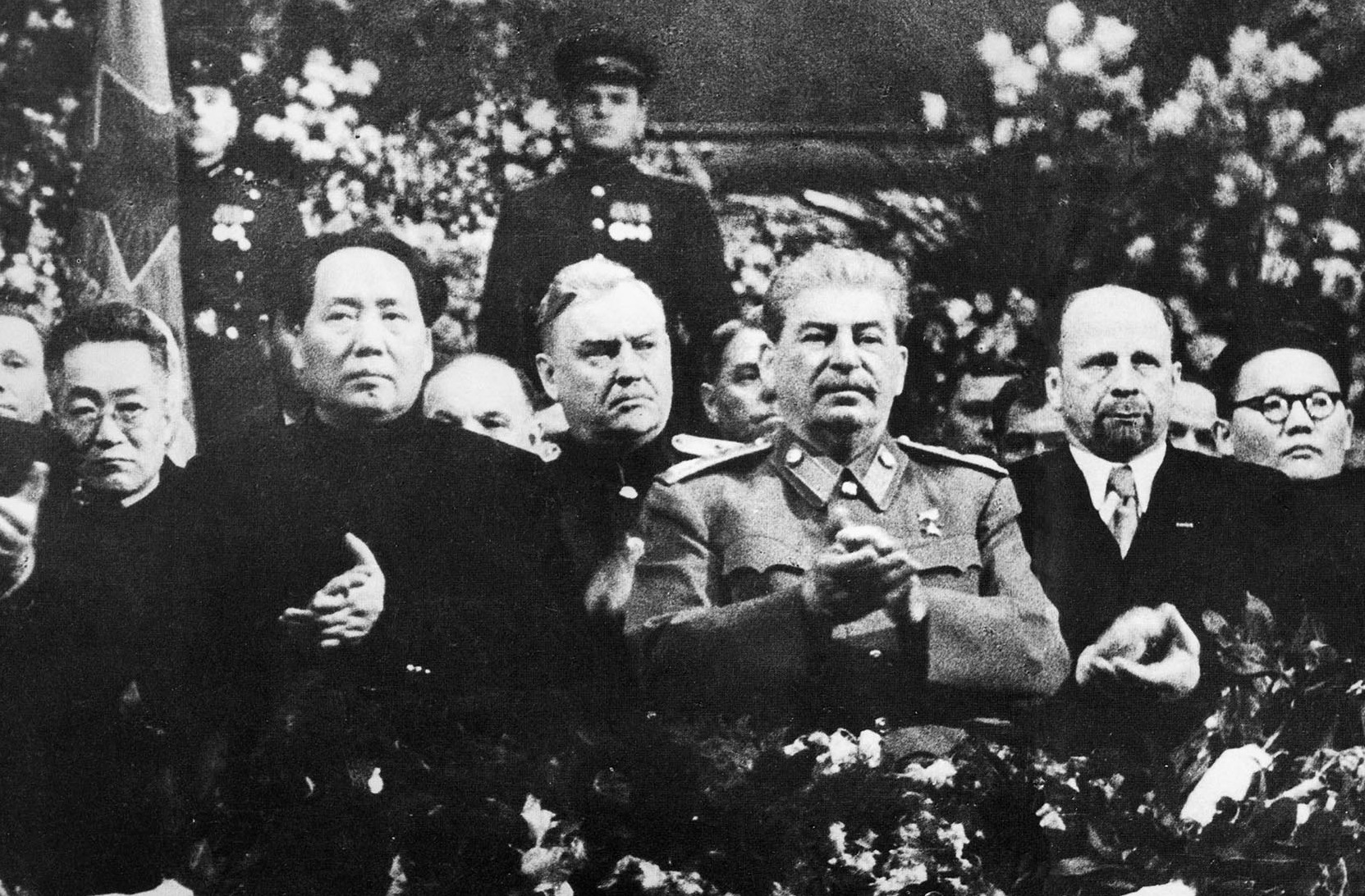
Communist leaders in 1949, left-to-right: Mao Zedong, Nikolai Bulganin, Joseph Stalin, Walter Ulbricht and Yumjaagiin Tsedenbal

In 1952, Khorloogiin Choibalsan died and Yumjaagiin Tsedenbal gained power. Tsedenbal purged his political rivals: Dashiin Damba in 1958–1959, Daramyn Tömör-Ochir in 1962, Luvsantserengiin Tsend in 1963 and the Lookhuuz-Nyambuu-Surmaajav anti-party group in December 1964. His foreign policy was marked by efforts to bring Mongolia into closer cooperation with the Soviet Union and attempts to incorporate the country into the Soviet Union. Tsedenbal's attempts to make Mongolia the 16th Republic of the Soviet Union met strong opposition from other politicians and he was accused of treachery. During the Sino-Soviet split, Tsedenbal sided with the Soviet Union, incurring Chinese wrath. He is remembered for maintaining a path of moderate socialism during the Cold War.

In August 1984, Yumjaagiin Tsedenbal was forced into retirement in a Soviet-sponsored move, allegedly due to age and mental state. Jambyn Batmönkh took power that month as the party and national leader.

=== 1990 Democratic Revolution ===
The first open pro-democracy demonstration took place in front of the Youth Cultural Center in Ulaanbaatar on 10 December 1989. Over the next few months, the demonstration organizers founded Mongoliin Ardchilsan Kholboo (the Mongolian Democratic Union) and continued to organize demonstrations, rallies, protests and hunger, teachers' and workers' strikes in the capital and the countryside calling for democracy, receiving increased support from Mongolians nationwide.

On 7 March 1990 in Sükhbaatar Square, the Mongolian Democratic Union launched a hunger strike urging the communists to resign. The party's politburo, the governmental authority, eventually yielded to pressure and began negotiating with the pro-democracy leaders. Jambyn Batmönkh, chairman of the party's politburo, decided to dissolve it and resign on 9 March 1990. This paved the way for Mongolia's first multi-party elections.

Behind the scenes, the party considered cracking down on the protesters and formulated a decree to be signed by party leader Batmönkh. Batmönkh opposed it, maintaining his policy of never using force (Mongolian: Хэрхэвч Хүч хэрэглэж болохгүй). According to those present, Batmönkh said "I will never sign this. We few Mongols have not yet come to the point that we will make each other's noses bleed", struck the table and left the room.

=== Post-communism ===
Logo of the Mongolian People's Revolutionary Party from 1990 to 1992

In the 1990 elections, the country's first multi-party election, parties contended for 430 seats in the People's Great Khural. With the opposition unable to fully field all candidates, the MPRP won 357 seats in the Great Khural and 31 of 53 seats in the Little Khural (which was later abolished). The new MPRP government under Dashiin Byambasüren shared power with the opposition, implementing constitutional and economic reforms and adopting a new constitution in 1992. With the collapse of the Soviet Union (which had provided significant economic aid to Mongolia until 1990), the country experienced severe economic problems. In the 1993 presidential elections, the MPRP was defeated for the first time in its history—Punsalmaagiin Ochirbat, former MPRP member and candidate backed by the opposition, received two-thirds of the vote.

Later in 1996, the opposition Democratic Union Coalition won the 1996 parliamentary elections for the first time. In 2000, 2004 and 2008, the MPRP won the legislative elections and was the ruling party. It formed two coalition governments with the Democratic Party, from 2004 to 2008 and 2008 to 2012. In 2003, the MPRP joined the Socialist International.

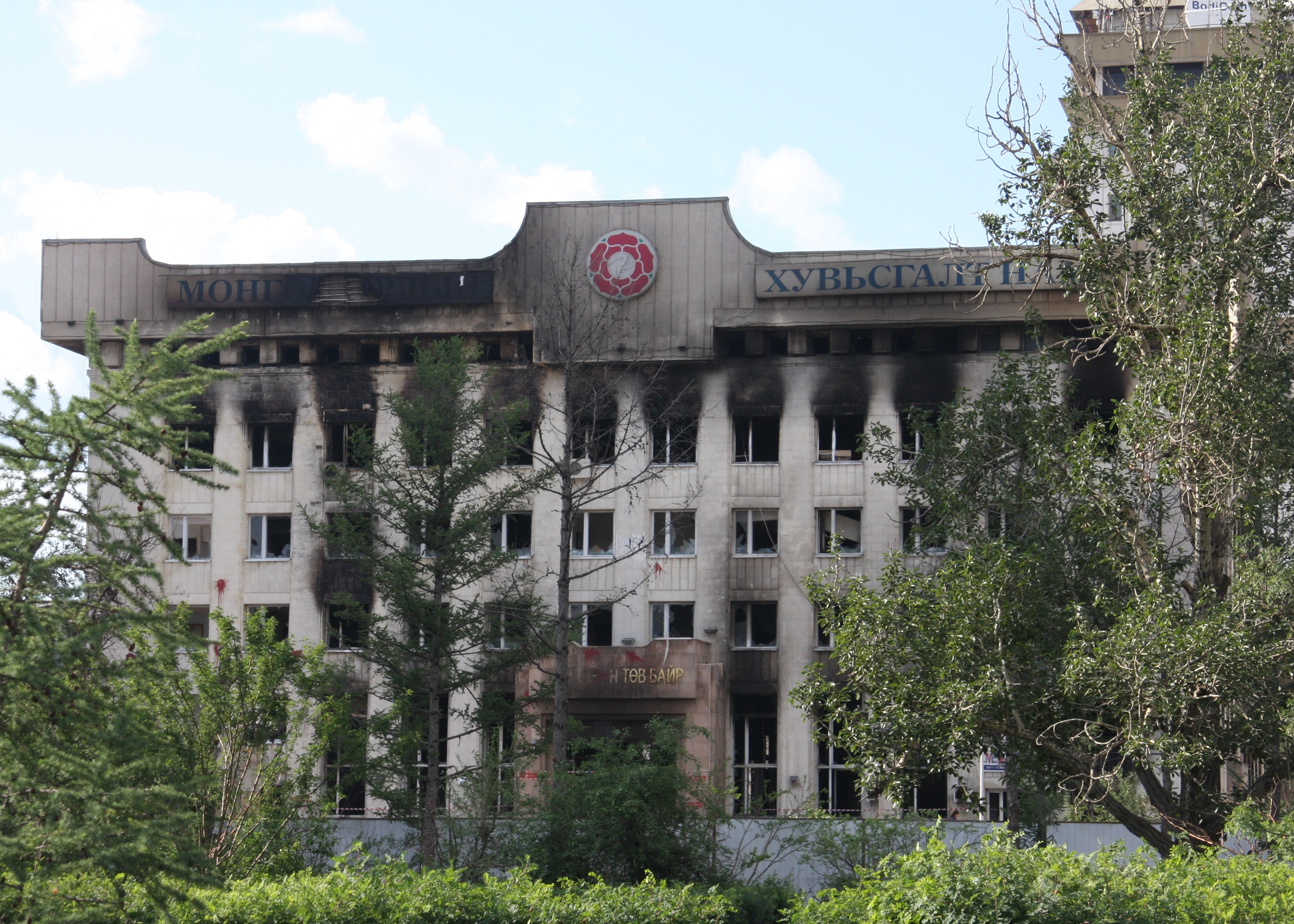
Headquarters of the MPRP in the aftermath of the riots, July 2008

The 2008 parliamentary elections were especially controversial, with the MPRP accused of vote-rigging. Protests against the results turned violent on 1 July and a riot broke out at MPRP headquarters which was half-heartedly addressed by authorities—the party headquarters was destroyed by fire. After the riots, a five-day state of emergency was declared by President Nambaryn Enkhbayar for the first time in Mongolia's history. Five civilians died during the emergency: four were shot and the fifth allegedly died from carbon-monoxide poisoning. Then-Minister of Justice estimated that 220 civilians and 108 service members were injured. With the situation tense, the MPRP decided to admit the Democratic Party into the government and formed a coalition. The party demolished its headquarters and built the Independence Palace (Mongolian: Тусгаар тогтнолын ордон) with government subsidies and donations from party members; the building became fully operational on 26 November 2011.

=== Name restoration ===
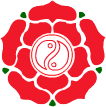
Logo of the MPRP from 1998 to 2010, later adopted by a new party with the same name

The restoration of the party name to the Mongolian People's Party had been at the core of discussions among party members and at party congresses since 1990. In November 2010, it was extensively deliberated at all party levels, resulting on 81.3 percent of the membership supporting the restoration of the Mongolian People's Party name and 10.7 percent of the membership wanting to deliberate the matter during the 26th Party Congress. The decision to restore the party's original name was approved by 99.3 percent of the delegates to the 26th Party Congress. At the congress, the party shifted from democratic socialism to social democracy.

After the MPRP restored its original name, former president and MPRP chairman Nambaryn Enkhbayar founded a new political party in 2010. Enkhbayar received permission to use the name Mongolian People's Revolutionary Party for his new party from the Supreme Court of Mongolia on 24 June 2011.

In the 2009 presidential election, Democratic Party candidate Elbegdorj defeated the MPRP candidate and incumbent president Enkhbayar. In January 2012, the Democratic Party decided to leave the coalition government before the June elections. In the 2012 parliamentary elections, the Democratic Party defeated the MPP; the MPP became the opposition, with 26 seats in parliament. In the 2012 local elections in Ulaanbaatar, the provinces and districts, the MPP was defeated for the first time in Mongolia's history. In the 2013 presidential election, the Democratic Party candidate and incumbent president Elbegdorj again defeated the MPP candidate.

The MPP returned to power in 2016, winning an 85-percent majority of parliamentary seats. Prime Minister Chimediin Saikhanbileg and parliament chairman Zandaakhuugiin Enkhbold were defeated, with the MPP's Jargaltulgyn Erdenebat elected to succeed Saikhanbileg.

=== Victories in the 2020s ===
The MPP won a landslide victory in the 2020 parliamentary election. The party's election platform had six chapters and addresses population income, economic policy, governance, green development policy, Ulaanbaatar city development, and regional development policy. The election result marked the first time a single party has retained an absolute majority in consecutive elections. Previously the Mongolian People's Party and the Democratic Party had taken turns wielding a majority in the State Great Khural or were compelled to form coalition governments.

In June 2021, former prime minister Ukhnaagiin Khurelsukh of the MPP became the country's sixth democratically elected president after winning the 2021 presidential election, further consolidating the party's power in the Mongolian government.

The party retained its absolute majority (although much reduced) in the 2024 parliamentary election.

== Leaders ==
- Soliin Danzan (1921)
- Ajvaagiin Danzan (1923–1924)
- Tseren-Ochiryn Dambadorj (1922–1923; 1924–1928)
- Ölziitiin Badrakh (1928–1932)
- Bat-Ochiryn Eldev-Ochir (1928–1930; 1932–1937)
- Peljidiin Genden (1928–1932)
- Zolbingiin Shijee (1930–1932)
- Jambyn Lkhümbe (1932–1933)
- Dorjjavyn Luvsansharav (1932–1937)
- Khas-Ochiryn Luvsandorj (1934–1936)
- Banzarjavyn Baasanjav (1936–1940)
- Yumjaagiin Tsedenbal (1940–1954; 1958–1984)
- Dashiin Damba (February–April 1940; 1954–1958)
- Jambyn Batmönkh (1984–1990)
- Gombojavyn Ochirbat (1990–1991)
- Büdragchaagiin Dash-Yondon (1991–1996)
- Natsagiin Bagabandi (February–June 1997)
- Nambaryn Enkhbayar (1996-1997; 1997–2005)
- Miyeegombyn Enkhbold (2005–2007)
- Sanjiin Bayar (2007–2010)
- Sükhbaataryn Batbold (2010–2012)
- Ölziisaikhany Enkhtüvshin (2012–2013)
- Miyeegombyn Enkhbold (2013–2017)
- Ukhnaagiin Khürelsükh (2017–2021)
- Luvsannamsrain Oyun-Erdene (2021–2025)
- Dashzegviin Amarbayasgalan (Note: Amarbayasgalan was overwhelmingly elected as party chairman in September 2025, but due to a party feud, he was never officially registered by the Supreme Court of Mongolia.) (2025)
- Nyam-Osoryn Uchral (2025–current)

== Organisation ==
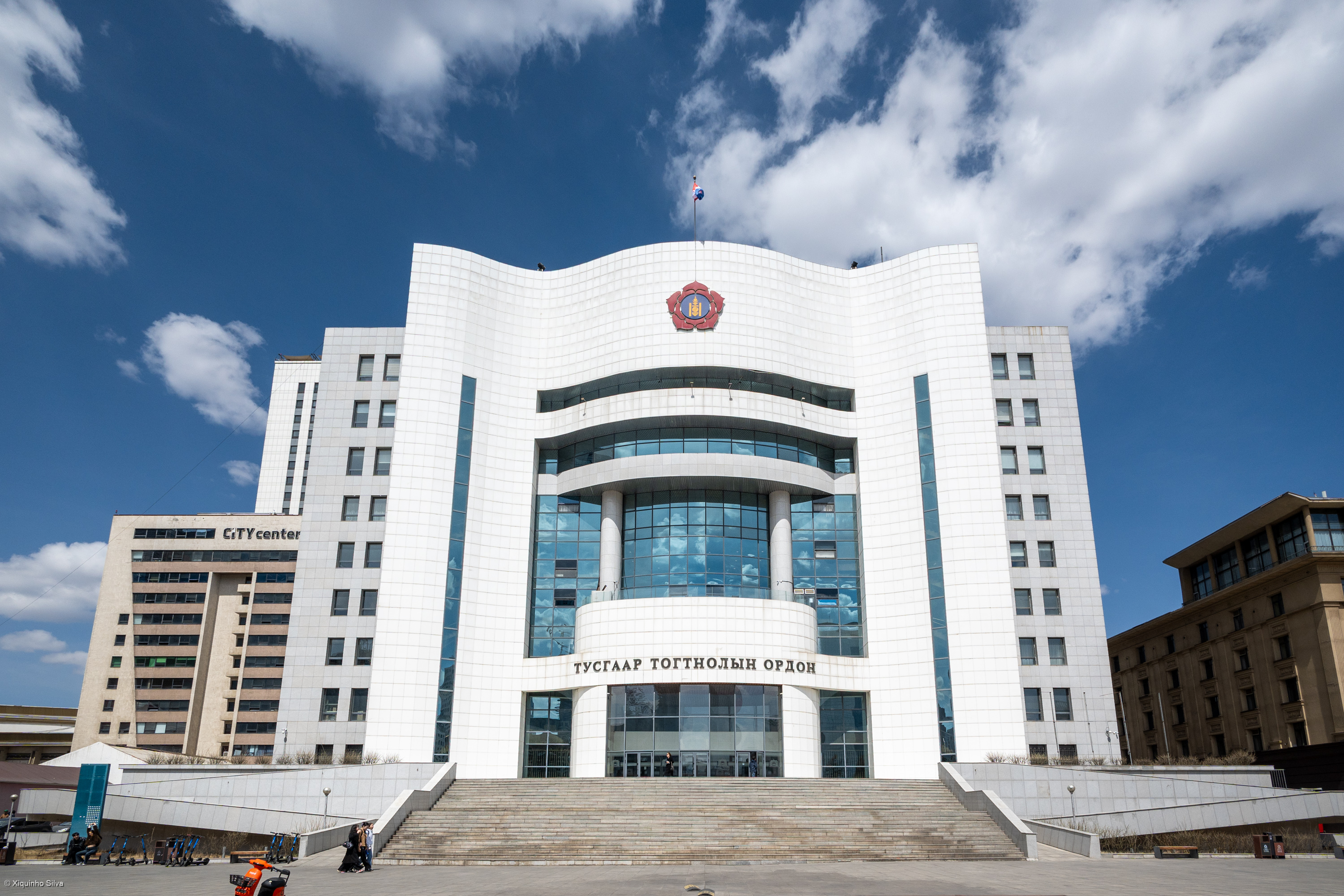
Independence Palace, the headquarters of the Mongolian People's Party since 2011

=== Affiliated organisations ===
As of April 2026, the Mongolian People's Party has six affiliated groups and organisations.

- Social Democratic Mongolian Youth Union, abbr. Social Democratic Youth (SDY) (Mongolian: Социал Демократ Монголын Залуучуудын Холбоо, СДМЗХ)
- Social Democratic Mongolian Student Union, abbr. Social Democratic Student (SDS) (Mongolian: Социал Демократ Монголын Оюутны Холбоо, СДМОХ)
- Social Democratic Mongolian Women's Union, abbr. Social Democratic Women (SDW) (Mongolian: Социал Демократ Монголын Эмэгтэйчүүдийн Холбоо, СДМЭХ)
- Social Democratic Elder's Union (SDE) (Mongolian: Социал Демократ Ахмадын Холбоо, СДАХ)

== Election history ==
=== Presidential elections ===
Election	Party candidate	Votes	%	Result
1993	Lodongiyn Tudev	397,061	40.1%	Lost ✗
1997	Natsagiin Bagabandi	597,573	62.5%	Elected ✓
2001	Natsagiin Bagabandi	581,381	59.2%	Elected ✓
2005	Nambaryn Enkhbayar	495,730	54.20%	Elected ✓
2009	Nambaryn Enkhbayar	520,948	48.07%	Lost ✗
2013	Badmaanyambuugiin Bat-Erdene	520,380	41.97%	Lost ✗
2017	Miyeegombyn Enkhbold	497,067	44.85%	Lost ✗
2021	Ukhnaagiin Khürelsükh	820,092	72.24%	Elected ✓

=== State Great Khural elections ===
Election	Party leader	Votes	%	Seats	+/–	Position	Result
1951	Yumjaagiin Tsedenbal			176 / 295	Steady	1st	Sole legal party
1954	Dashiin Damba			192 / 295	▲16	1st	Sole legal party
1957	Dashiin Damba			178 / 233	▼14	1st	Sole legal party
1960	Yumjaagiin Tsedenbal			207 / 267	▲29	1st	Sole legal party
1963	Yumjaagiin Tsedenbal			216 / 270	▲9	1st	Sole legal party
1966	Yumjaagiin Tsedenbal			234 / 287	▲18	1st	Sole legal party
1969	Yumjaagiin Tsedenbal			252 / 297	▲18	1st	Sole legal party
1973	Yumjaagiin Tsedenbal			282 / 336	▲30	1st	Sole legal party
1977	Yumjaagiin Tsedenbal			328 / 354	▲46	1st	Sole legal party
1981	Yumjaagiin Tsedenbal			344 / 370	▲16	1st	Sole legal party
1986	Jambyn Batmönkh			346 / 370	▲2	1st	Sole legal party
1990	Gombojavyn Ochirbat			357 / 430	▲11	1st	Supermajority government
1992	Büdragchaagiin Dash-Yondon	1,724,627	57.06	70 / 76	▼287	1st	Supermajority government
1996	Büdragchaagiin Dash-Yondon	408,929	40.64	25 / 76	▼45	▼2nd	Opposition
2000	Nambaryn Enkhbayar	516,792	51.75	72 / 76	▲47	▲1st	Supermajority government
2004	Nambaryn Enkhbayar	523,677	48.87	37 / 76	▼35	1st	Coalition government
2008	Sanjiin Bayar	1,534,033	43.09	45 / 76	▲8	1st	Coalition government
2012	Sükhbaataryn Batbold	353,923	31.31	26 / 76	▼19	▼2nd	Opposition
2016	Miyeegombyn Enkhbold	636,138	45.12	65 / 76	▲39	▲1st	Supermajority government
2020	Ukhnaagiin Khürelsükh	1,795,665	44.98	62 / 76	▼3	1st	Supermajority government
2024	Luvsannamsrain Oyun-Erdene	509,482	35.01	68 / 126	▲6	1st	Coalition government

=== Little Khural elections ===
Election	Party leader	Votes	%	Seats	+/–	Position	Result
1990	Gombojavyn Ochirbat	598,984	61.26%	31 / 50	▲31	▲1st	Governing majority
