= National park =

Park for conservation of nature and usually also for visitors

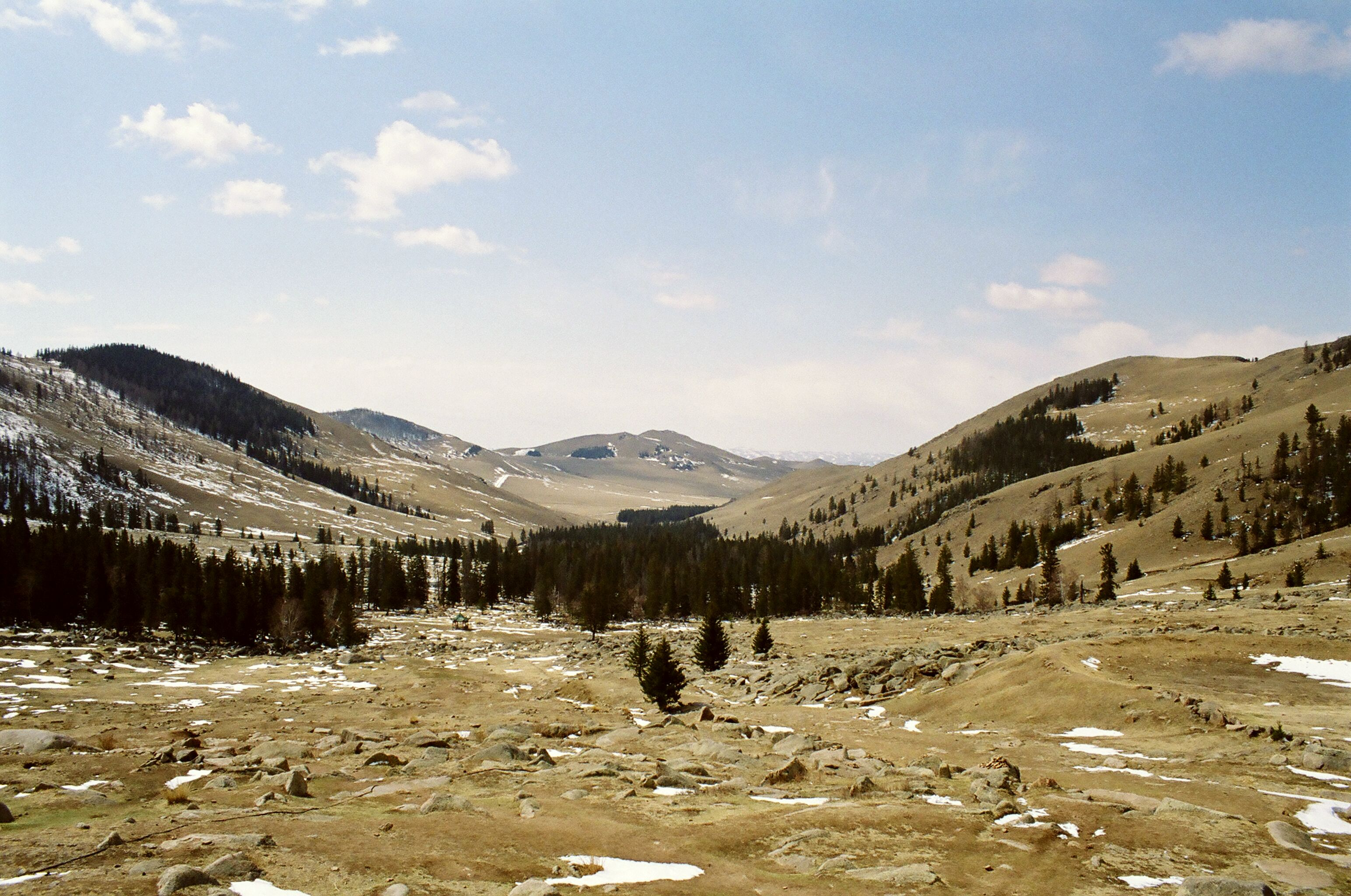
Bogd Khan Uul National Park in Mongolia is one of the earliest preserved areas now called a national park.

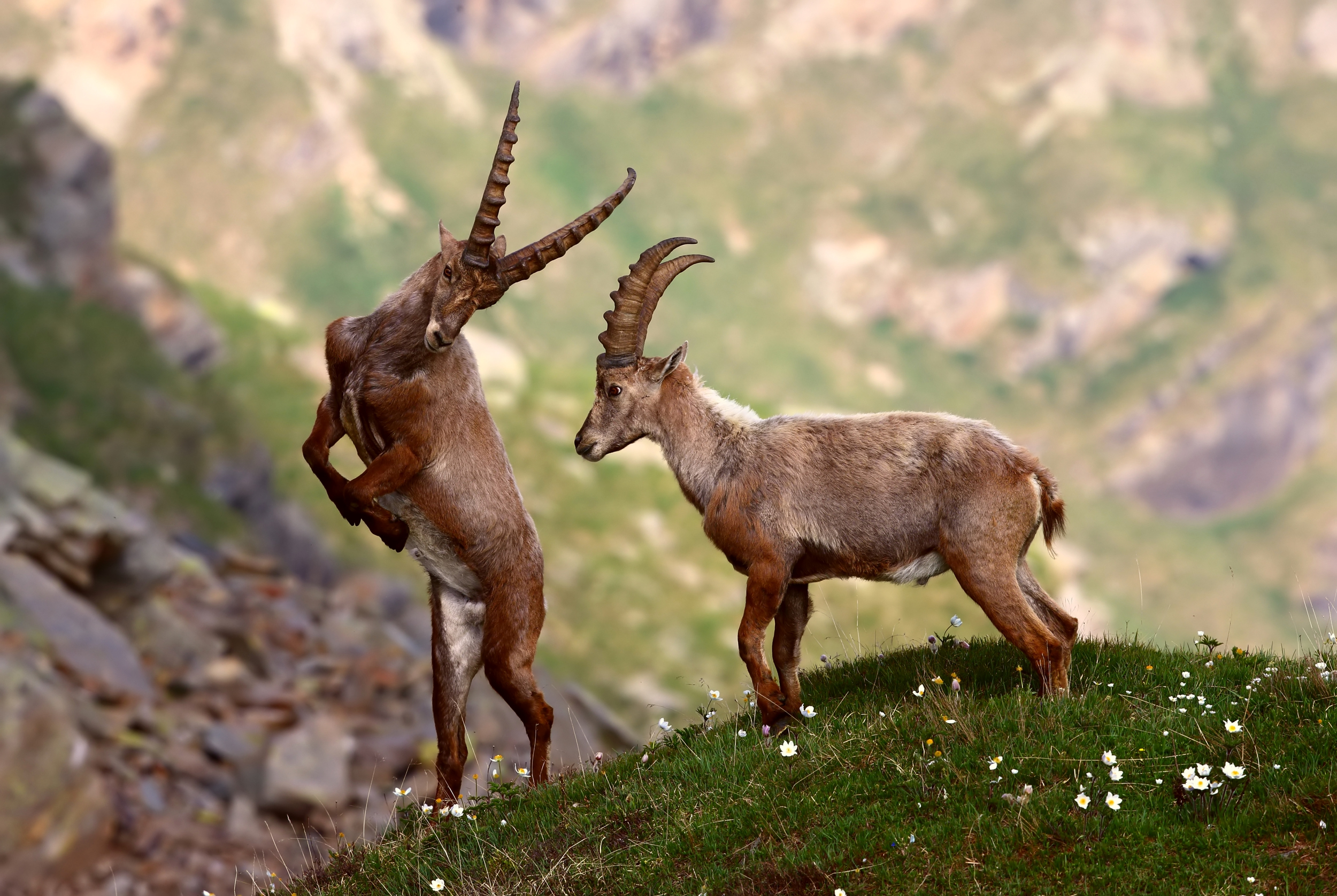
National parks often allow protected species to flourish. Pictured are alpine ibexes (Capra ibex) in the Gran Paradiso National Park, Piedmont, Italy. The ibex population has increased tenfold since the area was declared a national park in 1922.

A national park is a nature park designated for conservation purposes because of unparalleled national natural, historic, or cultural significance. It is an area of natural, semi-natural, or developed land that is protected and owned by a government. Although governments hold different standards for national park designation, the conservation of 'wild nature' for posterity and as a symbol of national pride is a common motivation for the continued protection of all national parks around the world. National parks are almost always accessible to the public. Usually national parks are developed, owned and managed by national governments, though in some countries with federal or devolved forms of government, "national parks" may be the responsibility of subnational, regional, or local authorities. (Note: In Australia, the vast majority of "national parks" are managed by state governments rather than the federal government; for example, Royal National Park, mentioned in this article as one of the earliest national parks, is actually owned and operated by New South Wales. Similarly, the province of Quebec, Canada, uses the designation "national park" for all of its provincially owned and operated parks. National parks in the United Kingdom are devolved to various authorities at the subnational and local levels.)

The United States established Yellowstone National Park, the first "public park or pleasuring-ground for the benefit and enjoyment of the people", in 1872. Although Yellowstone was not officially termed a "national park" at the time, in practice it is widely held to be the first and oldest national park in the world. The Tobago Main Ridge Forest Reserve (in what is now Trinidad and Tobago; established in 1776) and the area surrounding Bogd Khan Uul Mountain (Mongolia, 1778), which were restricted from cultivation to protect surrounding farmland, are considered the oldest legally protected areas. Parks Canada, established on May 19, 1911, is the world's oldest national park service.

The International Union for Conservation of Nature (IUCN) and its World Commission on Protected Areas (WCPA) have defined "National Park" as its Category II type of protected areas. According to the IUCN, 6,555 national parks worldwide met its criteria in 2006. IUCN is still discussing the parameters of defining a national park.

The largest national park in the world meeting the IUCN definition is the Northeast Greenland National Park, which was established in 1974 and is 972,000 km^{2} (375,000 sq mi) in area.

== Definitions ==
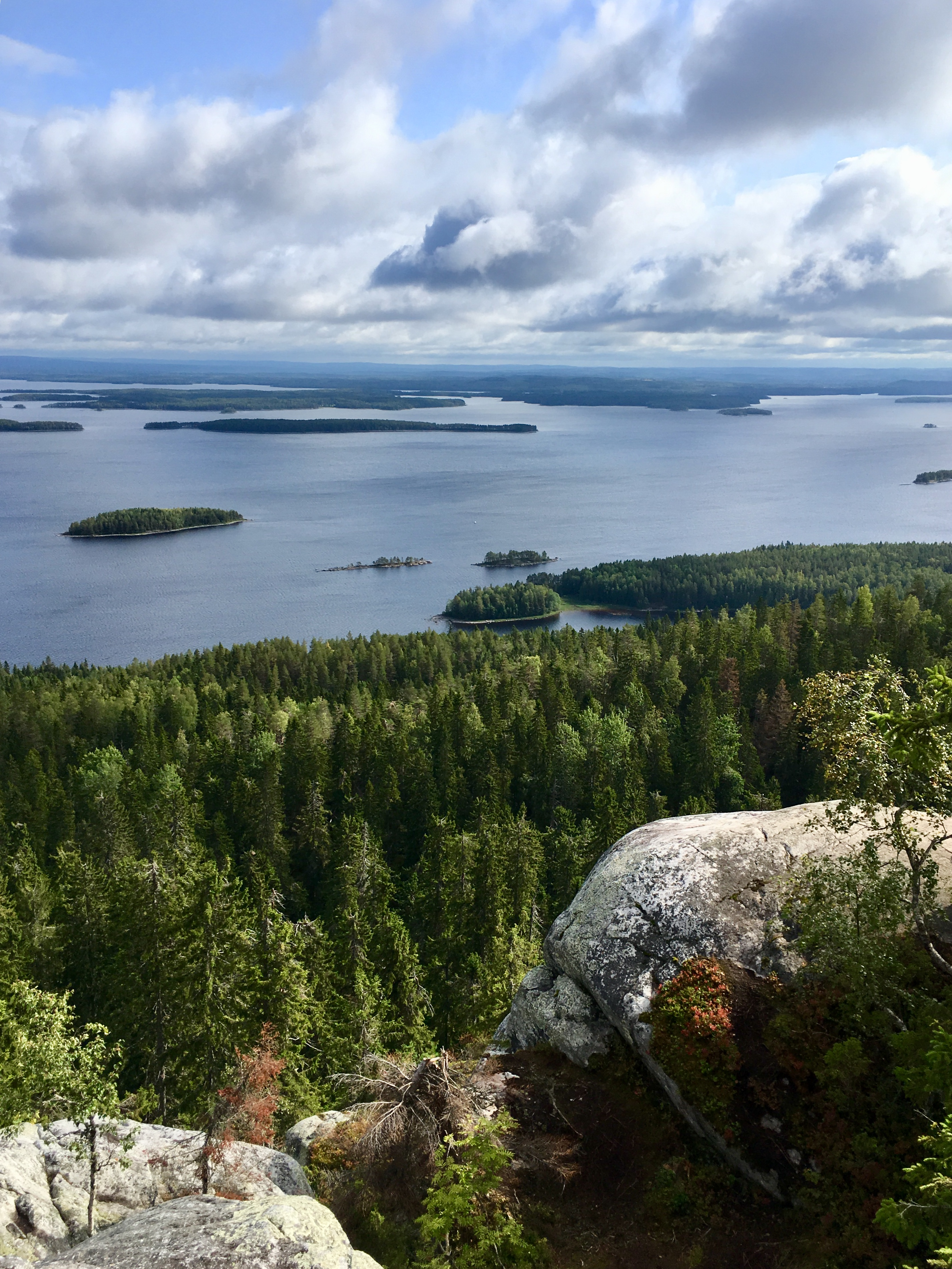
Landscapes of the Koli National Park in North Karelia, Finland, have inspired many painters and composers, including Jean Sibelius, Juhani Aho, and Eero Järnefelt.

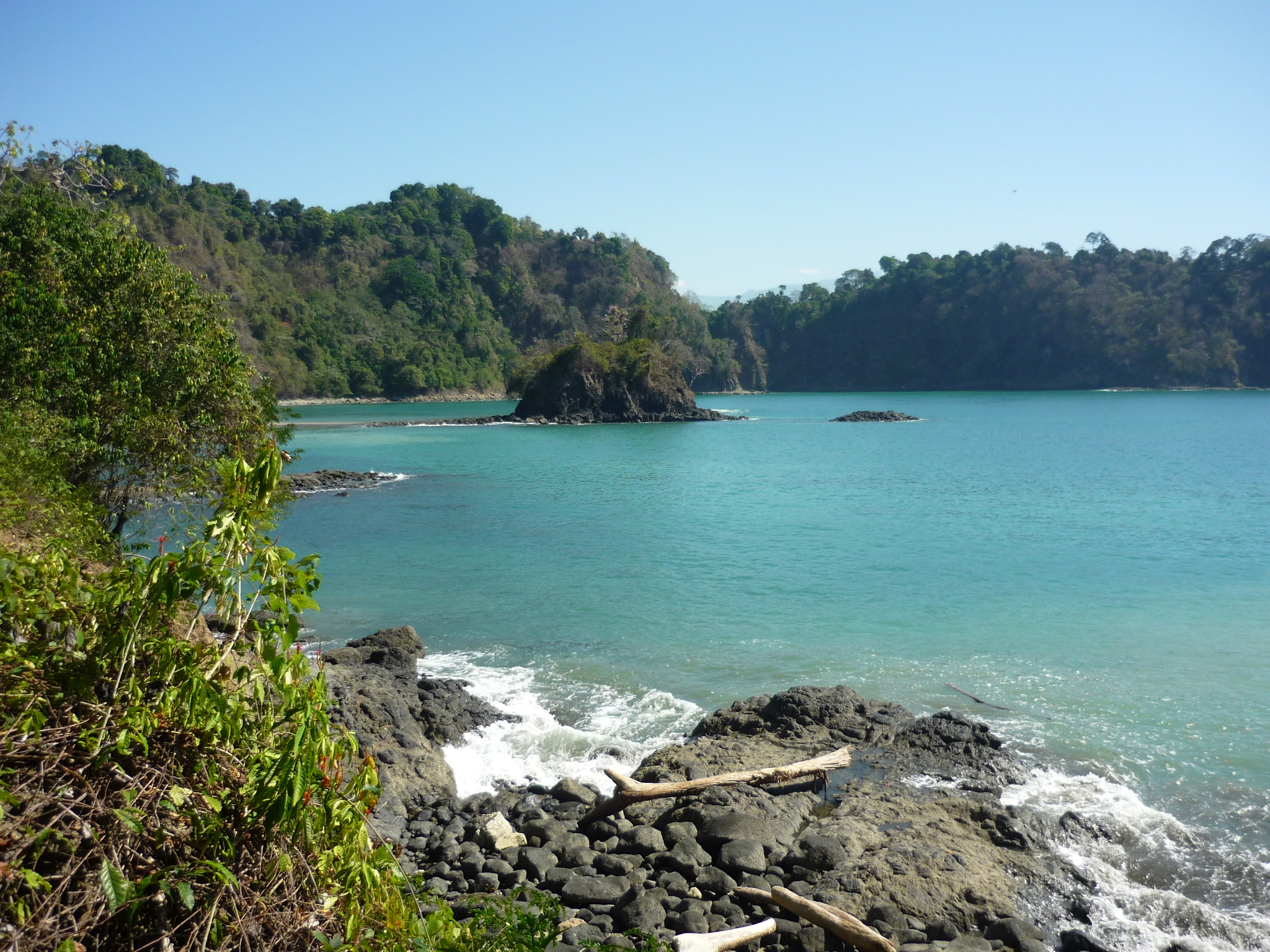
Manuel Antonio National Park in Costa Rica was listed by Forbes as one of the world's 12 most beautiful national parks.

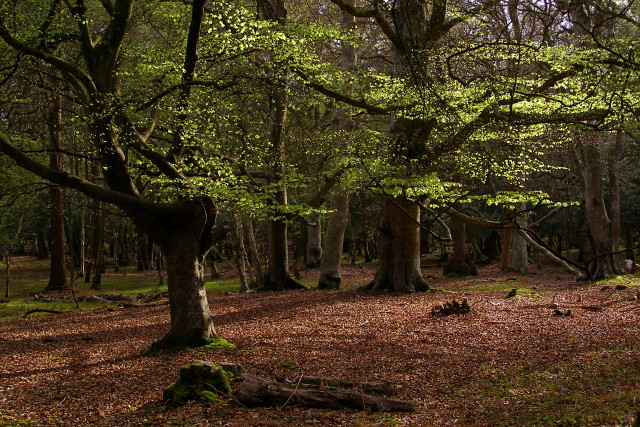
Beech trees in Mallard Wood, New Forest National Park, Hampshire, England

In 1969, the IUCN declared a national park to be a relatively large area with the following defining characteristics:

- One or several ecosystems not materially altered by human exploitation and occupation, where plant and animal species, geomorphological sites and habitats are of special scientific, educational, and recreational interest or which contain a natural landscape of great beauty;
- Highest competent authority of the country has taken steps to prevent or eliminate exploitation or occupation as soon as possible in the whole area and to effectively enforce the respect of ecological, geomorphological, or aesthetic features which have led to its establishment; and
- Visitors are allowed to enter, under special conditions, for inspirational, educative, cultural, and recreative purposes.

In 1971, these criteria were further expanded upon leading to more clear and defined benchmarks to evaluate a national park. These include:

- Minimum size of 1,000 hectares within zones in which protection of nature takes precedence
- Statutory legal protection
- Budget and staff sufficient to provide effective protection
- Prohibition of exploitation of natural resources (including the development of dams) qualified by such activities as sport, hunting, fishing, the need for management, facilities, etc.

While the term national park is now defined by the IUCN, many protected areas in various countries are still called national park even when they correspond to other categories of the IUCN Protected Area Management Definition, for example:

- Swiss National Park, Switzerland: IUCN Ia – Strict Nature Reserve
- Everglades National Park, United States: IUCN Ib – Wilderness Area
- Koli National Park, Finland: IUCN II – Surface Area
- Victoria Falls National Park, Zimbabwe: IUCN III – National Monument
- Vitosha National Park, Bulgaria: IUCN IV – Habitat Management Area
- New Forest National Park, United Kingdom: IUCN V – Protected Landscape
- Etniko Ygrotopiko Parko Delta Evrou, Greece: IUCN VI – Managed Resource Protected Area

While national parks are generally understood to be administered by national governments (hence the name), in Australia, with the exception of six national parks, national parks are run by state governments and predate the Federation of Australia; similarly, national parks in the Netherlands are administered by the provinces. In Canada, there are both national parks operated by the federal government and provincial or territorial parks operated by the provincial and territorial governments, although nearly all are still national parks by the IUCN definition.

In many countries, including Indonesia, the Netherlands, and the United Kingdom, national parks do not adhere to the IUCN definition, while some areas which adhere to the IUCN definition are not designated as national parks.

=== Terminology ===
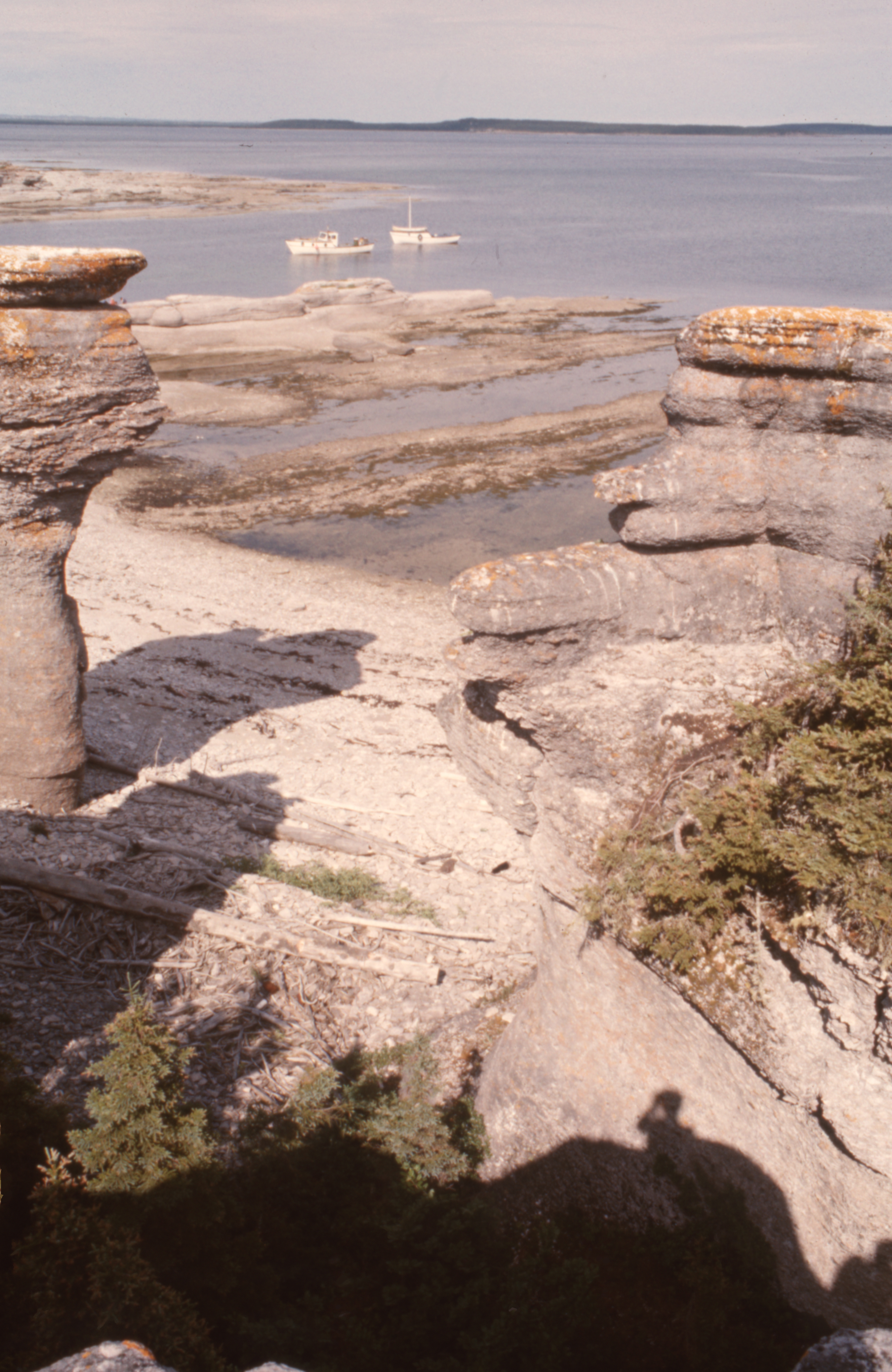
Mingan Archipelago National Park Reserve, Gulf of St. Lawrence, Quebec, Canada

As many countries do not adhere to the IUCN definition, the term "national park" may be used loosely. In the United Kingdom, and in some other countries such as Taiwan, a "national park" simply describes a general area that is relatively undeveloped, scenic, and attracts tourists, with some form of planning restrictions to ensure it maintains those characteristics. There may be substantial human settlements within the bounds of a national park.

Conversely, parks that meet the criteria may be not be referred to as "national parks". Terms like "preserve" or "reserve" may be used instead.

== History ==
=== Early references ===
Starting in 1735 the Naples government undertook laws to protect Natural areas, which could be used as a game reserve by the royal family; Procida was the first protected site; the difference between the many previous royal hunting preserves and this one, which is considered to be closer to a Park rather than a hunting preserve, is that Neapolitan government already considered the division into the present-day wilderness areas and non-strict nature reserves.

In 1810, the English poet William Wordsworth described the Lake District as a "sort of national property, in which every man has a right and interest who has an eye to perceive and a heart to enjoy". The painter George Catlin, in his travels through the American West, wrote during the 1830s that Native Americans in the United States might be preserved "(by some great protecting policy of government) ... in a magnificent park ... A nation's Park, containing man and beast, in all the wild and freshness of their nature's beauty!"

=== First efforts: Hot Springs, Arkansas and Yosemite Valley ===
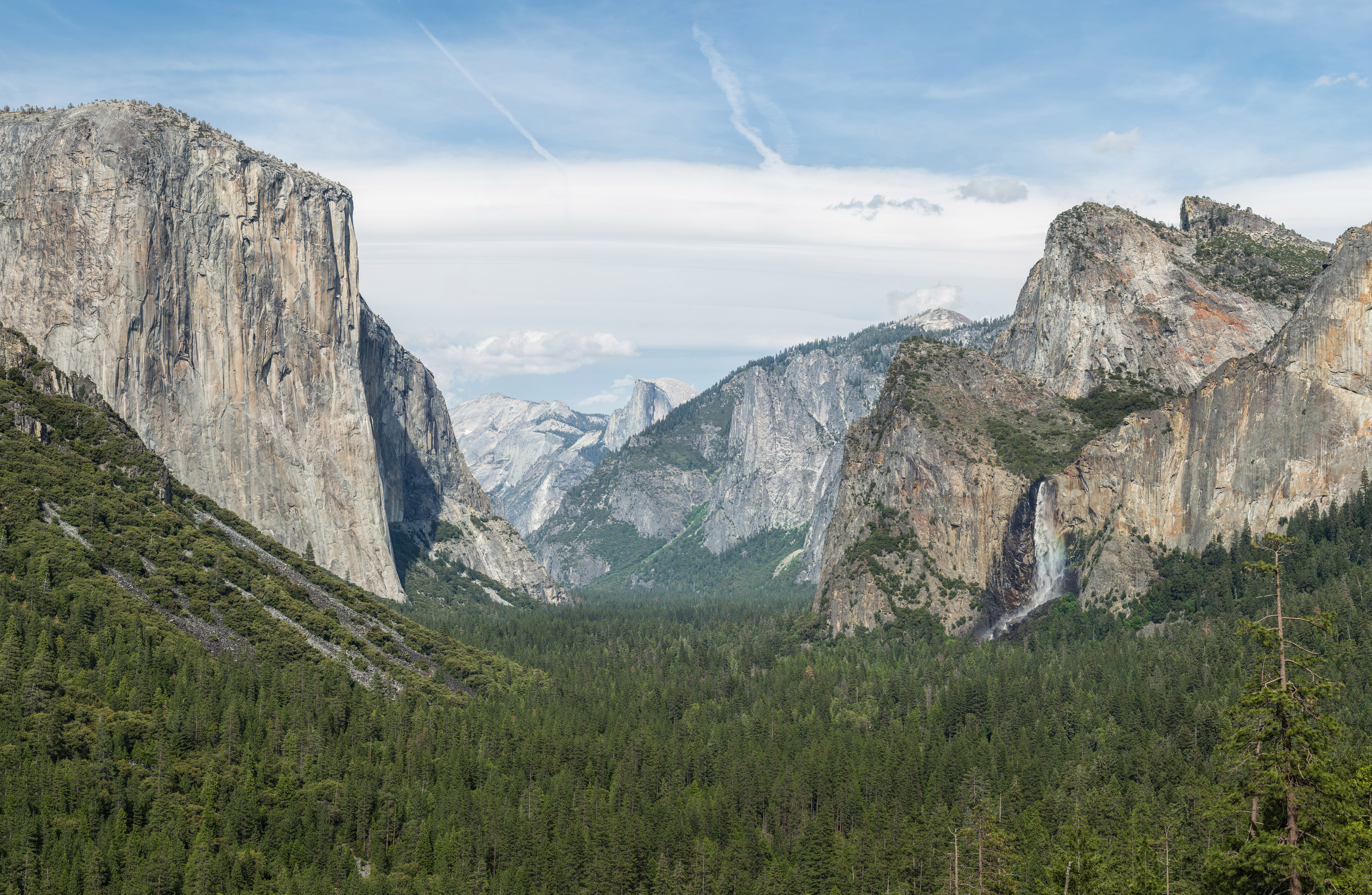
Yosemite Valley, Yosemite National Park, California, United States

The first effort by the U.S. Federal government to set aside such protected lands was on 20 April 1832, when President Andrew Jackson signed legislation that the 22nd United States Congress had enacted to set aside four sections of land around what is now Hot Springs, Arkansas, to protect the natural, thermal springs and adjoining mountainsides for the future disposal of the U.S. government. It was known as Hot Springs Reservation, but no legal authority was established. Federal control of the area was not clearly established until 1877. The work of important leaders who fought for animal and land conservation were essential in the development of legal action. Some of these leaders include President Abraham Lincoln, Laurance Rockefeller, President Theodore Roosevelt, John Muir, and First Lady Lady Bird Johnson to name a few.

John Muir is today referred to as the "Father of the National Parks" due to his work in Yosemite. He published two influential articles in The Century Magazine, which formed the basis for the subsequent legislation.

President Abraham Lincoln signed an Act of Congress on 1 July 1864, ceding the Yosemite Valley and the Mariposa Grove of giant sequoias (later becoming Yosemite National Park) to the state of California. According to this bill, private ownership of the land in this area was no longer possible. The state of California was designated to manage the park for "public use, resort, and recreation". Leases were permitted for up to ten years and the proceeds were to be used for conservation and improvement. A public discussion followed this first legislation of its kind and there was a heated debate over whether the government had the right to create parks. The perceived mismanagement of Yosemite by the Californian state was the reason why Yellowstone was put under national control at its establishment six years later.

=== First national park: Yellowstone ===
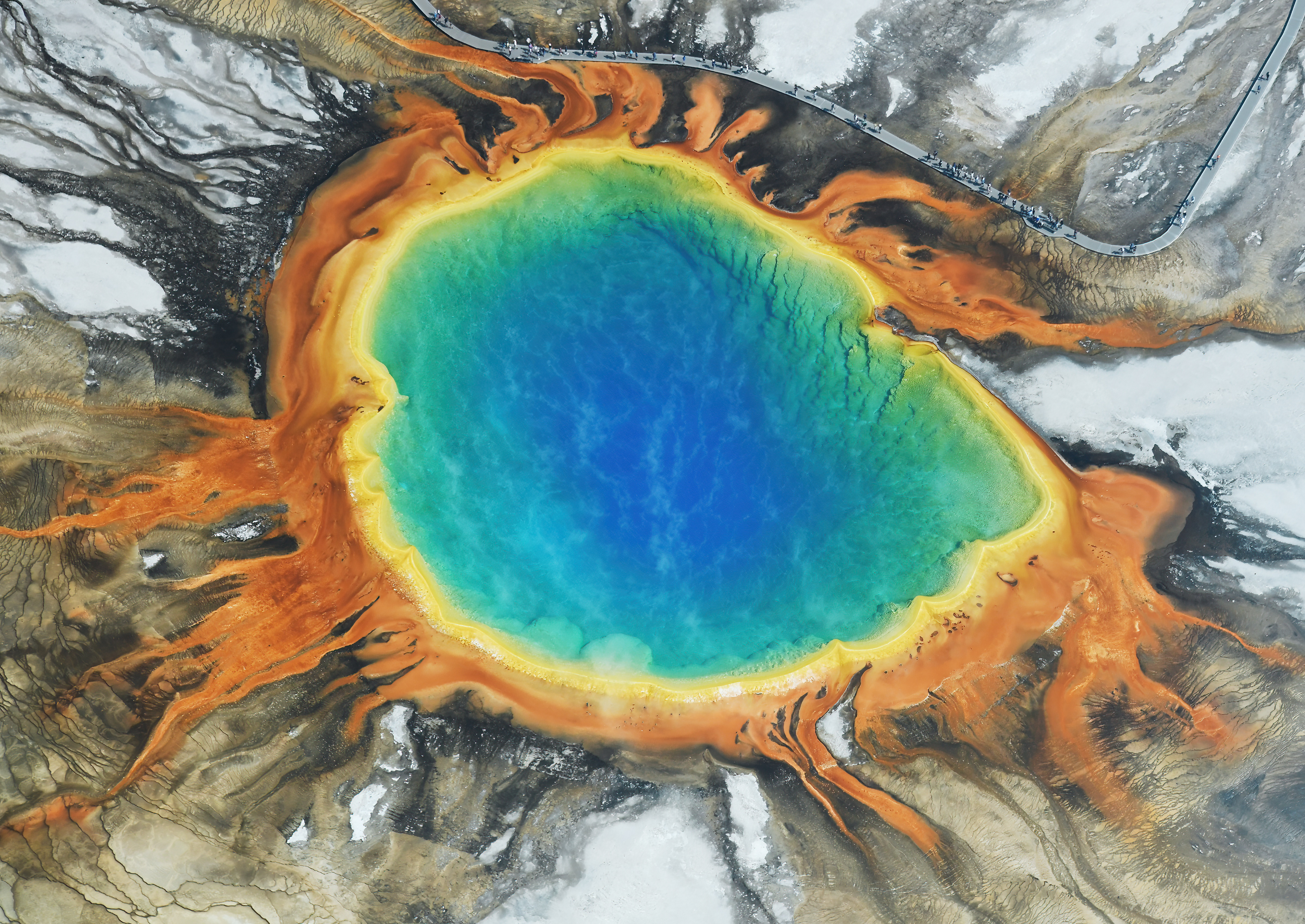
Grand Prismatic Spring in Yellowstone National Park, Wyoming, United States; Yellowstone was the first national park in the world.

In 1872, Yellowstone National Park was established as the United States' first national park, being also the world's first national park. In some European and Asian countries, however, national protection and nature reserves already existed - though typically as game reserves and recreational grounds set aside for royalty, such as a part of the Forest of Fontainebleau (France, 1861).

Yellowstone was part of a federally governed territory. With no state government that could assume stewardship of the land, the federal government took on direct responsibility for the park, the official first national park of the United States. The combined effort and interest of conservationists, politicians and the Northern Pacific Railroad ensured the passage of enabling legislation by the United States Congress to create Yellowstone National Park. Theodore Roosevelt and his group of conservationists, the Boone and Crockett Club, were active campaigners and were highly influential in convincing fellow Republicans and big business to back the bill. Yellowstone National Park soon played a pivotal role in the conservation of these national treasures, as it was suffering at the hands of poachers and others who stood at the ready to pillage what they could from the area. Theodore Roosevelt and his newly formed Boone and Crockett Club successfully took the lead in protecting Yellowstone National Park from this plight, resulting in laws designed to conserve the natural resources in Yellowstone and other parks under the Government's purview.

American Pulitzer Prize-winning author Wallace Stegner wrote: "National parks are the best idea we ever had. Absolutely American, absolutely democratic, they reflect us at our best rather than our worst."

=== International growth of national parks ===
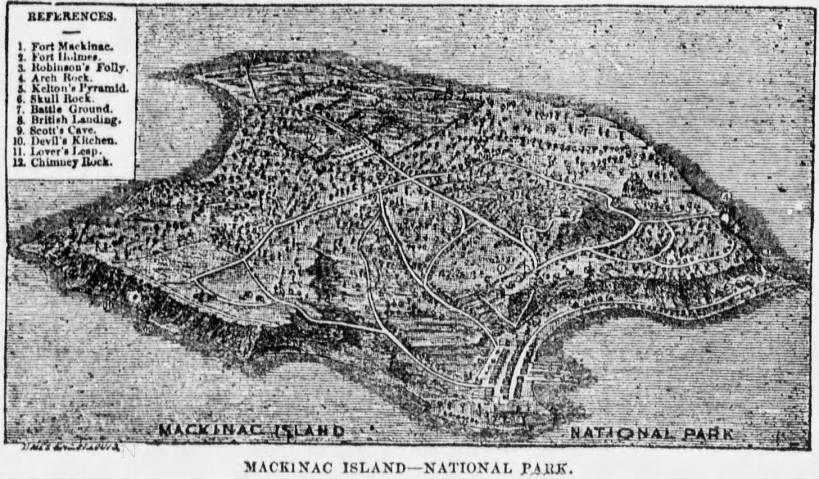
1890 map of Mackinac National Park

The first area to use "national park" in its creation legislation was the U.S.'s Mackinac National Park, in 1875. (The area was later transferred to the state's authority in 1895, thus losing its official "national park" status.)

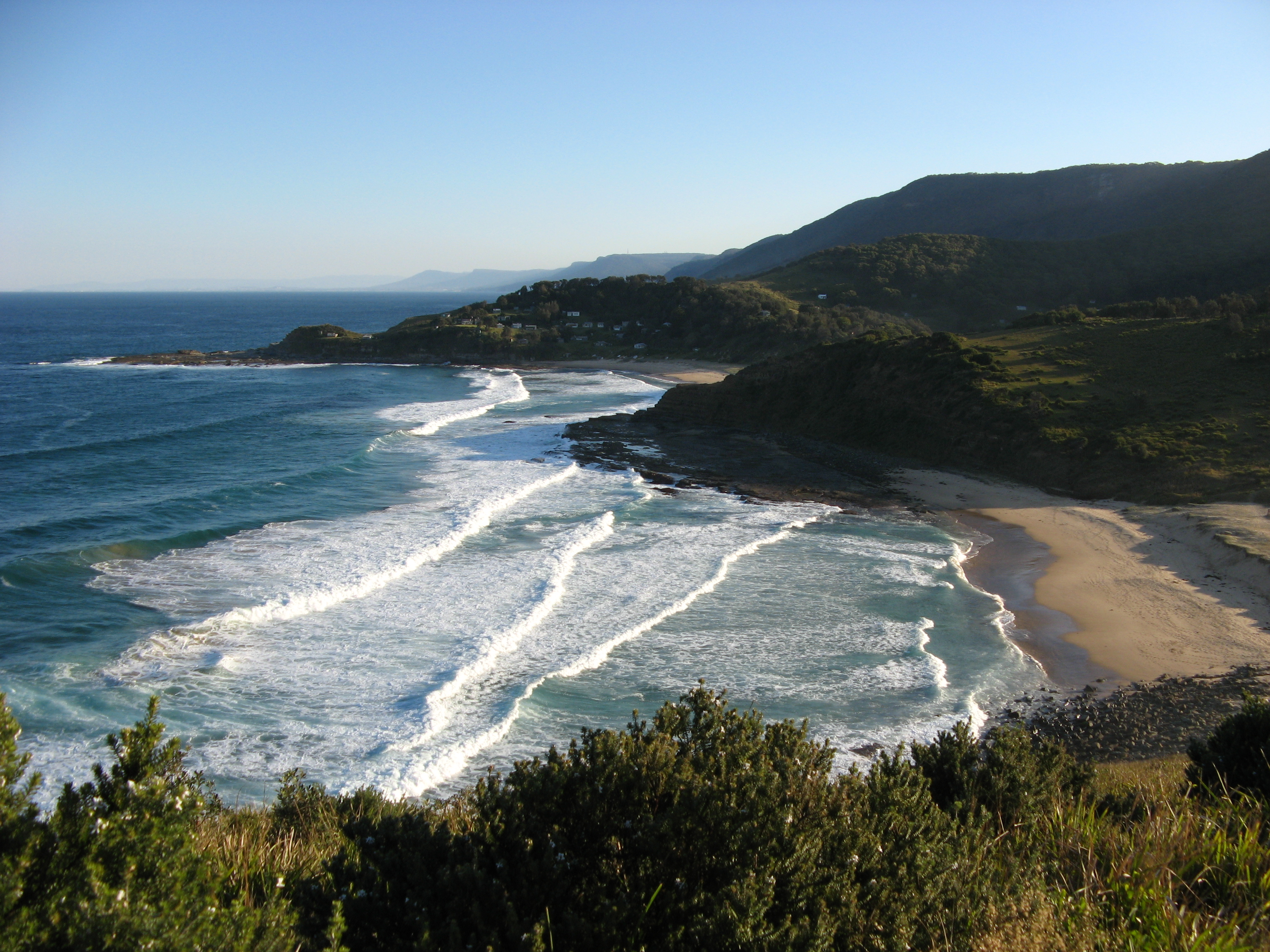
Royal National Park in New South Wales, Australia, was the world's second official national park

Following the idea established in Yellowstone and Mackinac, there soon followed parks in other nations. In Australia, what is now Royal National Park was established just south of Sydney, Colony of New South Wales, on 26 April 1879, becoming the world's second official national park. Since Mackinac lost its national park status, the Royal National Park is, by some considerations, the second oldest national park now in existence.

Banff National Park became Canada's first national park in 1885. New Zealand established Tongariro National Park in 1887. Argentina became the third country in the Americas to create a national park system, with the creation of the Nahuel Huapi National Park in 1934, through the initiative of Francisco Moreno.

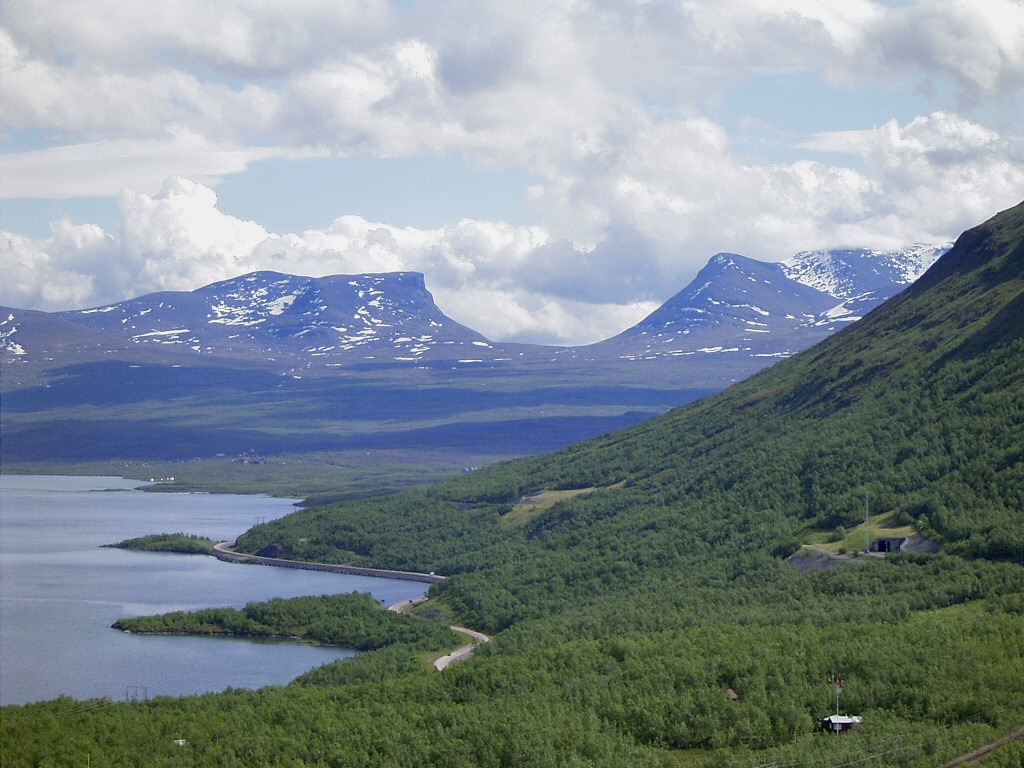
Abisko National Park in Sweden was one of the first national parks established in Europe

In Europe, the first national parks were a set of nine in Sweden in 1909, following the passing of a Riksdag law on national parks that year. Switzerland became the second European nation with the founding of the Swiss National Park in 1914. In 1971, Lahemaa National Park in Estonian SSR became the first area to be designated a national park in the former Soviet Union.

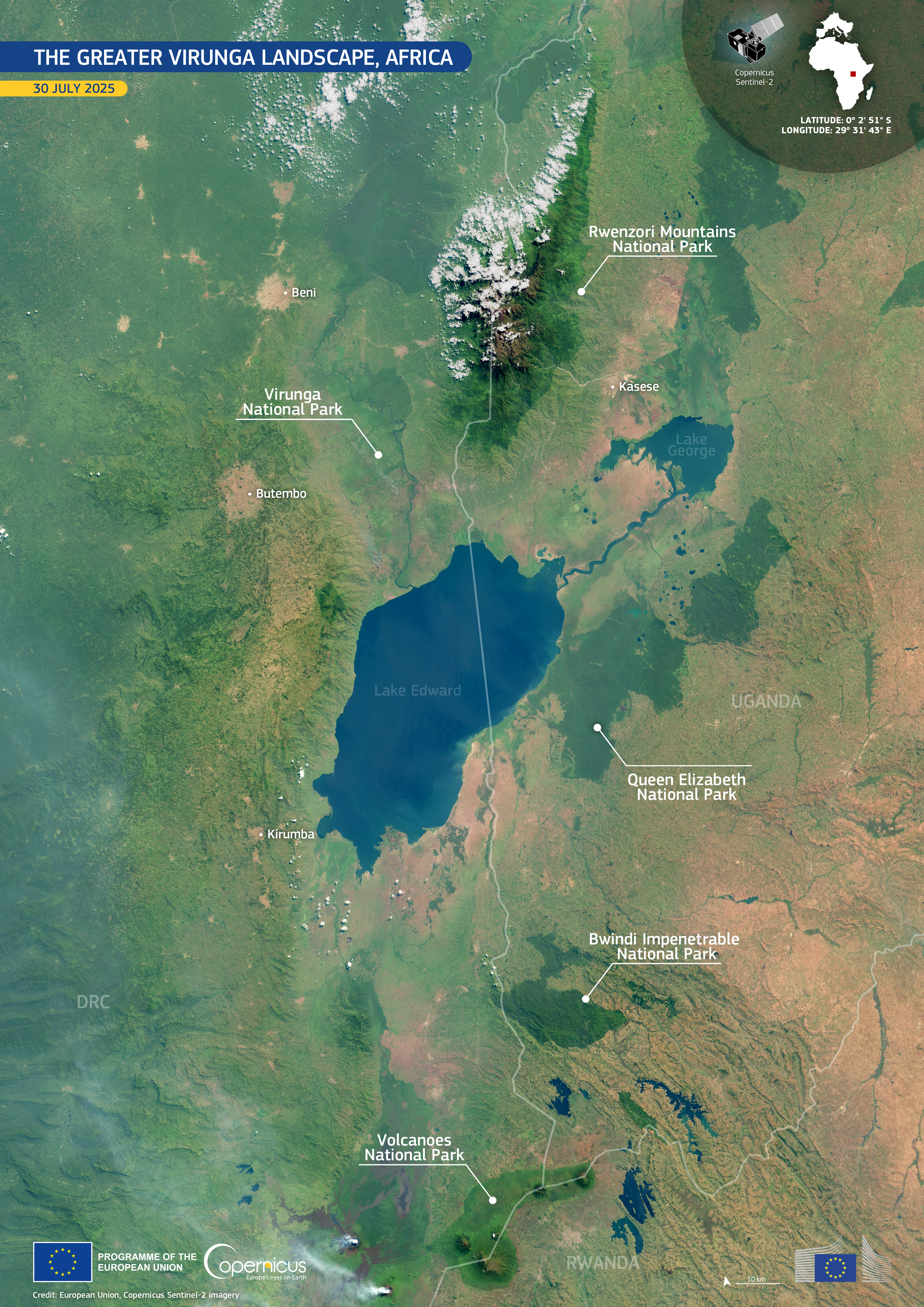
Several national parks in Africa: Virunga National Park, the Rwenzori Mountains National Park, the Queen Elizabeth National Park, the Bwindi Impenetrable National Park and the Volcanoes National Park

Africa's first national park was established in 1925 when king Albert I of Belgium designated an area in the east of what was then his personal domain of Congo Free State, now Democratic Republic of Congo as the Albert National Park, later renamed Virunga National Park. In 1926, the government of South Africa designated Kruger National Park as the nation's first national park, although it was an expansion and reorganization of the earlier government protected Sabie Game Reserve, established in 1898 by President Paul Kruger of the old South African Republic.

After World War II, national parks were founded all over the world. The United Kingdom designated its first national park, Peak District National Park, in 1951. This followed perhaps 70 years of pressure for greater public access to the landscape. By the end of the decade a further nine national parks had been designated in the UK.

Europe has over 400 national parks, as of 2026. The Vanoise National Park in the Alps was the first French national park, created in 1963 after public mobilization against a touristic project. In 1973, Mount Kilimanjaro was classified as a National Park and was opened to public access in 1977. In 1989, the Qomolangma National Nature Preserve (QNNP) was created to protect 3.381 million hectares on the north slope of Mount Everest in the Tibet Autonomous Region of China. This national park is the first major global park to have no separate warden and protection staff—all of its management consists of existing local authorities, allowing a lower cost basis and a larger geographical coverage (in 1989 when created, it was the largest protected area in Asia). It includes four of the six tallest mountains in the world: Everest, Lhotse, Makalu, and Cho Oyu. The QNNP is contiguous to four Nepali national parks, creating a transnational conservation area equal in size to Switzerland.

In 1993, the Blue and John Crow Mountains National Park was established in Jamaica to conserve and protect 41,198 hectares, including tropical montane rainforest and adjacent buffer areas. The site includes Jamaica's tallest peak (Blue Mountain Peak), hiking trails and a visitor center. The Park was also designated a UNESCO World Heritage Site in 2015.

=== National parks services ===
The world's first national park service was established May 19, 1911, in Canada. The Dominion Forest Reserves and Parks Act placed the dominion parks under the administration of the Dominion Park Branch (now Parks Canada), within the Department of the Interior. The branch was established to "protect sites of natural wonder" to provide a recreational experience, centred on the idea of the natural world providing rest and spiritual renewal from the urban setting. Canada now has the largest protected area in the world with 450,000 km^{2} of national park space.

Even with the creation of Yellowstone, Yosemite, and nearly 37 other national parks and monuments, another 44 years passed before an agency was created in the United States to administer these units in a comprehensive way – the U.S. National Park Service (NPS). The 64th United States Congress passed the National Park Service Organic Act, which President Woodrow Wilson signed into law on 25 August 1916. Of the 434 sites managed by the National Park Service of the United States, only 63 carry the designation of National Park.

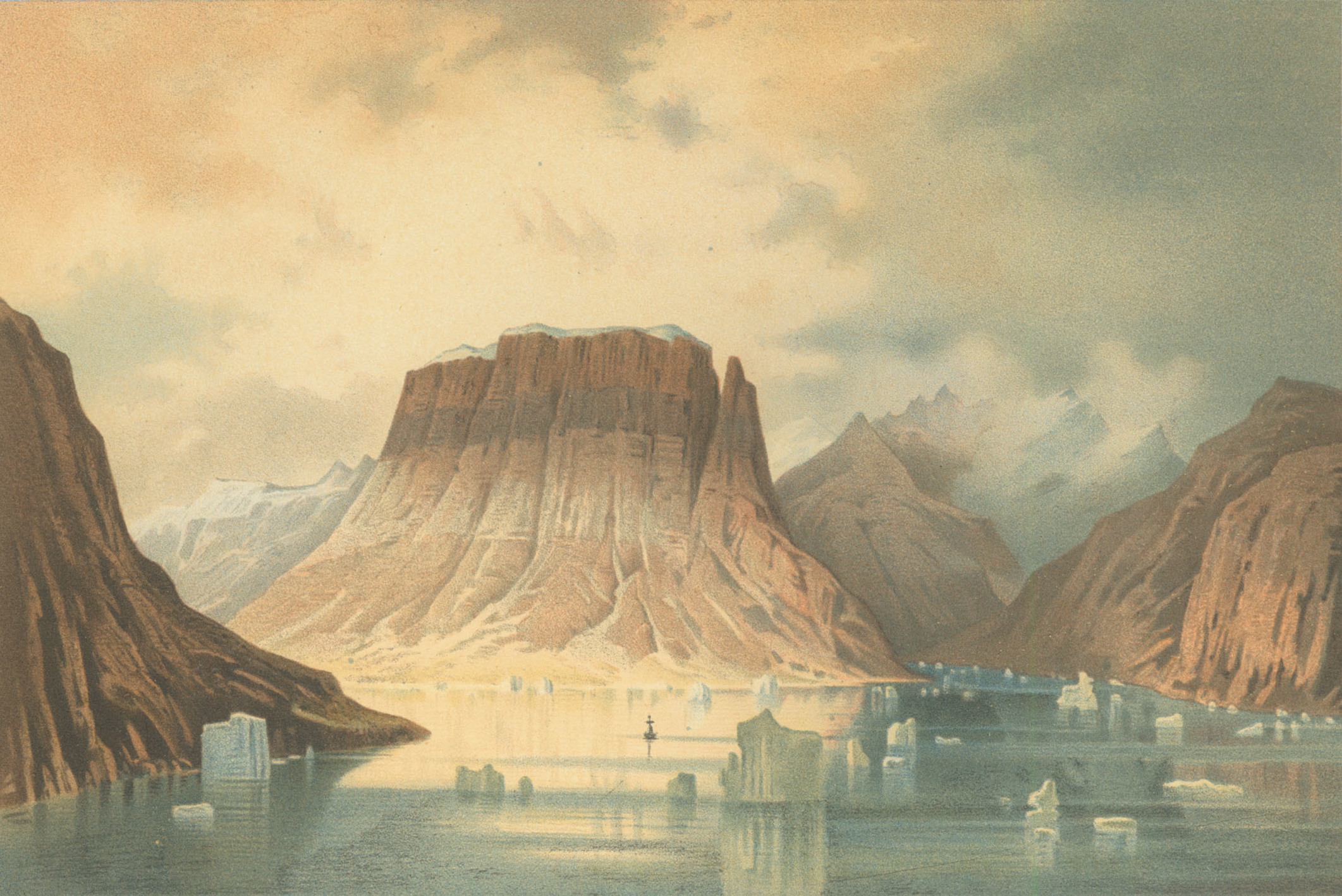
Painting (c. 1900) of the Teufelsschloss in Kaiser-Franz-Joseph-Fjord, East Greenland. The site is now part of the Northeast Greenland National Park.

== Economic ramifications ==
Countries with a large ecotourism industry, such as Costa Rica, often experience a huge economic effect on park management as well as the economy of the country as a whole.

=== Tourism ===
Tourism to national parks has increased considerably over time. In Costa Rica for example, a megadiverse country, tourism to parks has increased by 400% from 1985 to 1999. The term national park is perceived as a brand name that is associated with nature-based tourism and it symbolizes a "high quality natural environment with a well-designed tourist infrastructure".

=== Staff ===
The duties of a park ranger are to supervise, manage, and/or perform work in the conservation and use of park resources. This involves functions such as park conservation; natural, historical, and cultural resource management; and the development and operation of interpretive and recreational programs for the benefit of the visiting public. Park rangers also have fire fighting responsibilities and execute search and rescue missions. Activities also include heritage interpretation to disseminate information to visitors of general, historical, or scientific information. Management of resources such as wildlife, lake shores, seashores, forests, historic buildings, battlefields, archaeological properties, and recreation areas are also part of the job of a park ranger. Since the establishment of the National Park Service in the US in 1916, the role of the park ranger has shifted from merely being a custodian of natural resources to include several activities that are associated with law enforcement. They control traffic, manage permits for various uses, and investigate violations, complaints, trespass/encroachment, and accidents.

== Concerns ==
National parks in former European colonies have come under criticism for allegedly perpetuating colonialism. National parks were created by individuals who felt that pristine, natural sections of nature should be set aside and preserved from urban development. In America, this movement came about during the American frontier and were meant to be monuments to America's true history. Yet, in some instances, the lands that were to be set aside and protected in formerly colonized lands were already being inhabited by native communities, who were then removed off of these lands to create pristine sites for public consumption. Critics claim that the removal of people from national parks enhances the belief that nature can only be protected when humans do not exist within it, and that this leads to perpetuating the dichotomy between nature and humans (also known as the nature–culture divide). They see the creation of national parks as a form of eco-land grabbing. Others claim that traveling to national parks to appreciate nature there leads people to ignore the nature that exists around them every day. Still others argue that tourism can actually negatively impact the areas that are being visited.

Additionally, tourism in national parks can have negative environmental impacts. High levels of visitation may lead to habitat degradation, pollution, soil erosion, and disturbances to wildlife, potentially undermining the ecological health of the areas the parks are intended to protect.

== See also ==
- Country park
- List of national parks – by country
- Lists of tourist attractions
- Conservation ecology
- Conservation movement
- Conservation park (disambiguation)
- Federal lands (United States)
- Fossil park
- Freedom to roam
- Geopark
- Global Geoparks Network
- International Park
- National monument
- National Historic Site
- National Park Foundation
- Open Country
- Provincial park
- State park
- Sustainable development
- United Nations Environment Programme
- World Database on Protected Areas
