= Tserendorj =

Teserendorj (Mongolian: Цэрэндорж) is a Mongolian personal name.

Notable people with this name include:

as a proper name

- Balingiin Tserendorj (1868 - 1928), first Prime Minister of the People's Republic of Mongolia 1924 - 1928
- Manzushir Khutagt Sambadondogiin Tserendorj (1872 - 1937), acting prime minister of Outer Mongolia from May to July 1921

as a patronymic

- Tserendorjiin Baldorj, late President of the Mongol News Media Group
