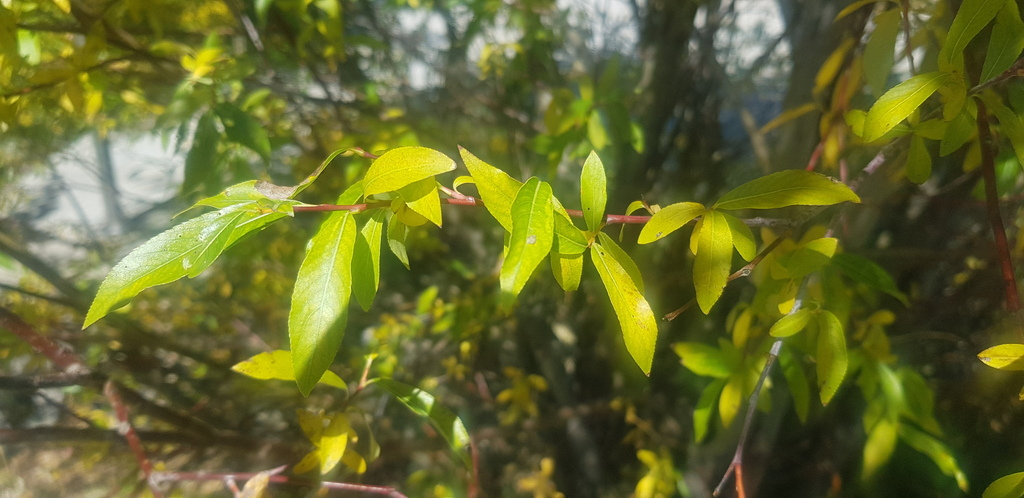

Scientific classification
- Kingdom: Plantae
- Clade: Tracheophytes
- Clade: Angiosperms
- Clade: Eudicots
- Clade: Rosids
- Order: Malpighiales
- Family: Salicaceae
- Genus: Salix
- Species: S. taraikensis

Binomial name
- Salix taraikensis Kimura.

= Salix taraikensis =

Species of willow

Salix taraikensis (Japanese: タライカヤナギ, romanized: Taraikayanagi) is a species of willow native to Hokkaidō, Japan and Sakhalin in Russia. It has also been found in the protected area around Bogd Khan Mountain in the Khentii Mountains of Mongolia. It is a deciduous large shrub, reaching a height of 5 m.
