= Manjusri Monastery =

Monastery in Bayanzürkh, Ulaanbaatar, Mongolia

Manjusri Monastery Манзуширын хийд
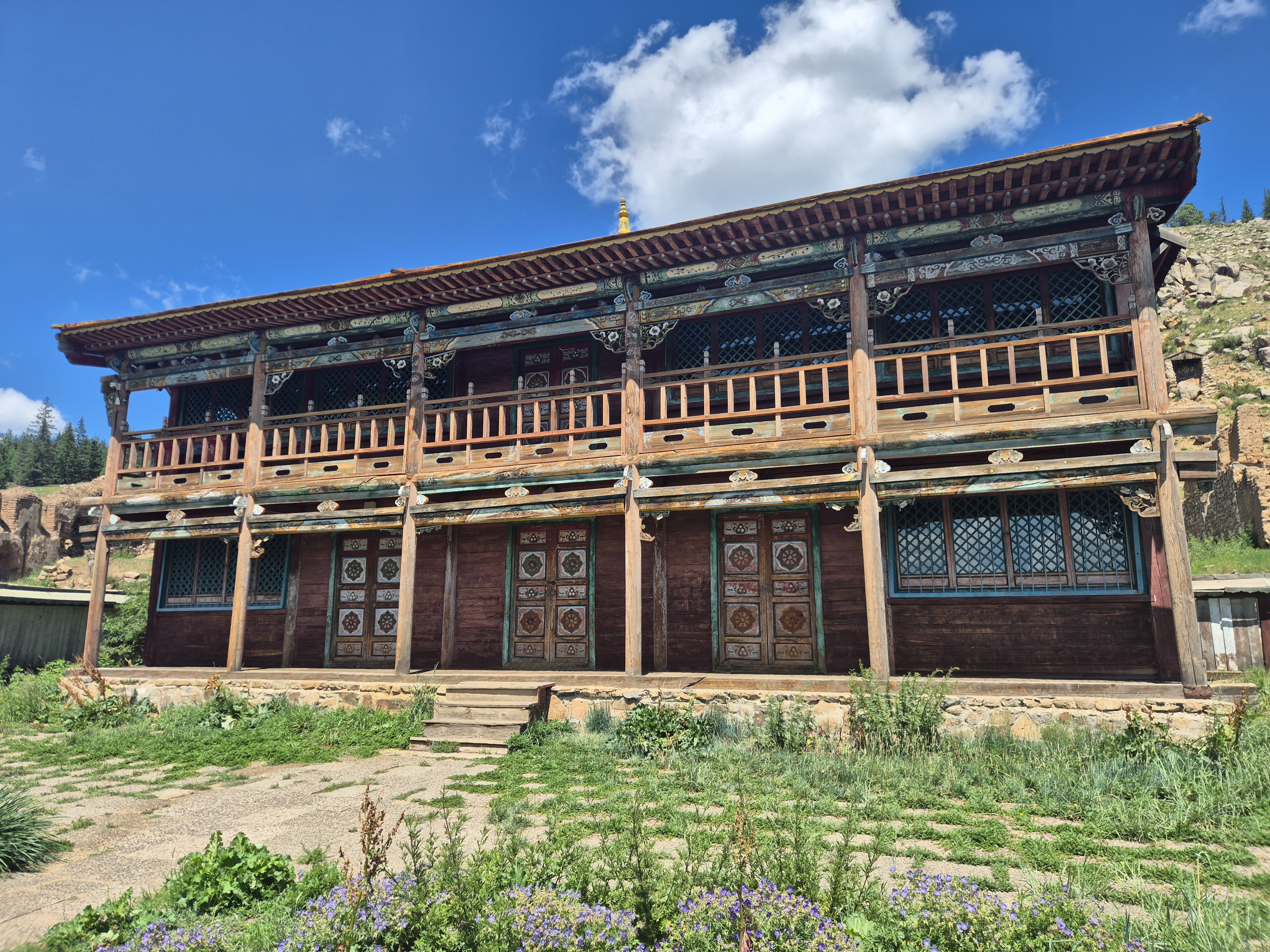
- Restored main building of the monastery

- Location within Mongolia

Religion
- Affiliation: Tibetan Buddhism

Location
- Location: Bogd Khan Mountain, Bayanzürkh, Ulaanbaatar, Mongolia
- Country: Mongolia
- Coordinates: 47°45′52″N 106°59′32″E

Architecture
- Style: Chinese, Mongol and Tibetan influences
- Completed: 1733

Manjushri Monastery (Mongolian: Манзуширын хийд, romanized: Manzushiriin khiid) is a former gompa established in 1733 and destroyed by Mongolian communists in 1937. Its ruins are located in Bayanzürkh, Ulaanbaatar, on the south slope of Bogd Khan Mountain. Its architecture contained Chinese, Mongol and Tibetan influences.

== History ==
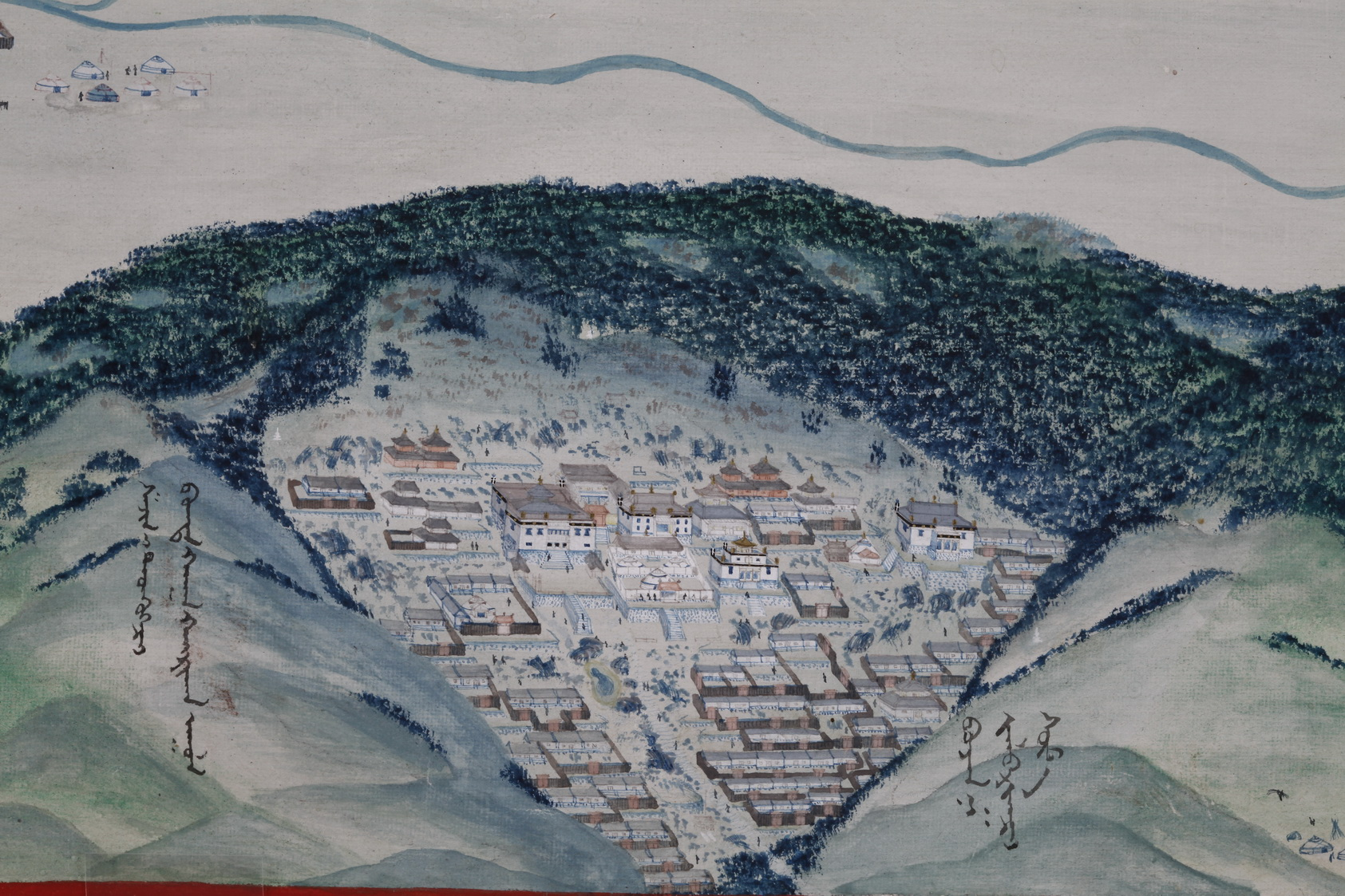
1913 depiction of Mañjuśrī Monastery

The monastery, dedicated to Mañjuśrī, the Bodhisattva of wisdom, was first established by the sainted monk Luvsanjambaldanzan in 1733 as the permanent residence of the Reincarnation of the Bodhisattva of Wisdom. It came under the personal administration of Mongolia’s religious leader, the Jebtsundamba Khutuktu, also known as the Bogd Khan, in 1750. Over time, the expanded monastery became one of the country's largest and most important monastic centers comprising 20 temples and housing more than 300 monks. Religious ceremonies often involved more than 1000 monks. The lamasery housed a collection of valuable and rare Buddhist scriptures, including golden script on silver leaf.

On February 3, 1921 the Bogd Khan sought refuge at the monastery after occupying Chinese troops released him as they fled invading forces loyal to Roman von Ungern-Sternberg. The Bogd Khan named the monastery’s chief abbot, Manzushir Khutagt Sambadondogiin Tserendorj, prime minister during Ungern von Sternberg’s puppet regime (February to July 1921).

The monastery’s fortunes changed after the Mongolian Revolution of 1921. In the early years following the revolution, Chief Abbot Tserendorj allegedly collaborated with the physically weakened Bogd Khan on various counter-revolutionary schemes, including sending messages for assistance to Japan. After the Bogd Khan's death in 1924, the monastery and its inhabitants suffered waves of persecution as the country's new socialist regime sought to eliminate the influence of institutional Buddhism in Mongolia. Between 1929 and 1930, Tserendorj had his personal property confiscated by the state and in 1936, at the start of Stalinist purges, he was one of 24 lamas arrested by Khorloogiin Choibalsan’s Interior Ministry for belonging to a "counter-revolutionary group." In February 1937, the monastery’s last remaining 53 lamas (most older than 50–60 years) were arrested and many were later shot. All 20 temples of the monastery were then destroyed and the valuable Buddhist scriptures were moved to the Mongolian National Library. After a year long trial, Tserendorj was found guilty and publicly executed in front of the national theater (present day Sükhbaatar Square) in October 1937.

Restoration of the individual buildings began in 1990 shortly after the 1990 Democratic Revolution and in 1992 the executed monks were officially rehabilitated. In 1998 the ruins of the monastery were protected by the state. To date, only the main building has been rebuilt and is now a museum.

== Plant and buildings ==
Next to the reconstructed museum stands the impressive Togchin temple ruins, originally built in 1749 with architecture that recalls the temples of Tibet. In all, the ruins of 17 buildings, distributed over a rising terrain, can be identified throughout the vast area of the monastery. In the cliff above the monastery are several 18th Century Buddhist cave paintings and reliefs, as well as Buddhist inscriptions in Tibetan language, which escaped destruction in 1937.

Not far from that is a 2-ton bronze cauldron created in 1726 engraved with a Tibetan inscription. It was used to provide food to the pilgrims and could boil up to 10 sheep and 2 cattle at a time.

== Current state ==
Most of the area surrounding the monastery is part of the Bogdkhan Uul Strictly Protected Area which contains abundant wildlife, streams and cedar trees. In 1783 the local Mongolian government of the Qing Dynasty declared the Bogd Khan Mountain a protected site, making it one of the world's oldest protected areas.

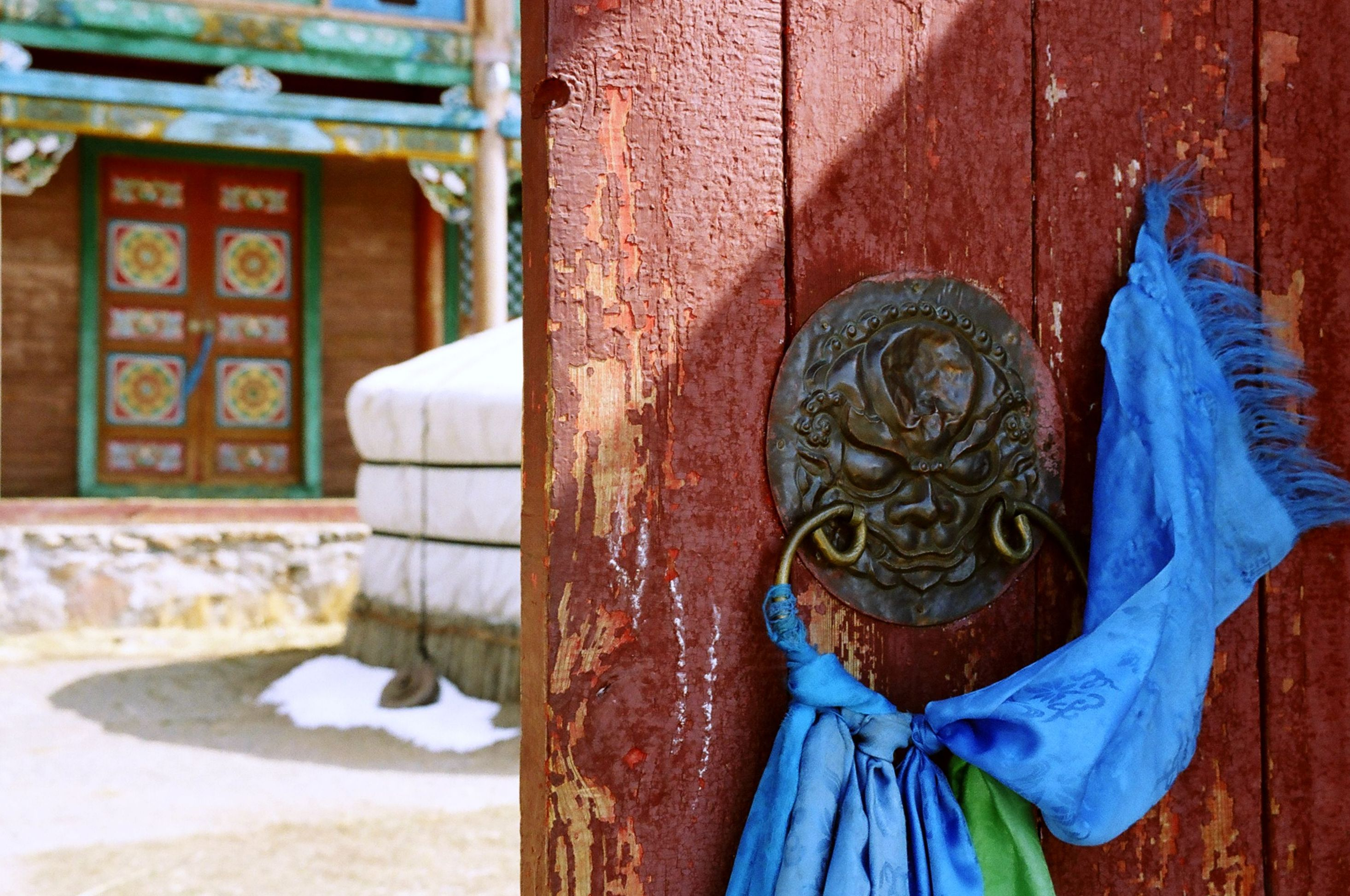
Gate of Mañjuśrī Monastery

Today, the monastery serves as a tourist and hiking destination with an on-site hostel. The monastery was returned to the Buddhist temple and the surviving objects within the monastery complex (the restored temple, the remains of walls and buildings, images of Buddhist deities and sacred inscriptions on the rocks) continue to be revered as objects of worship.

In the summer of 2009, Mongol and British Scouts began repainting the temple and collecting donations to fund the replacement of the wooden fence with a stone wall.

Manjusri Monastery

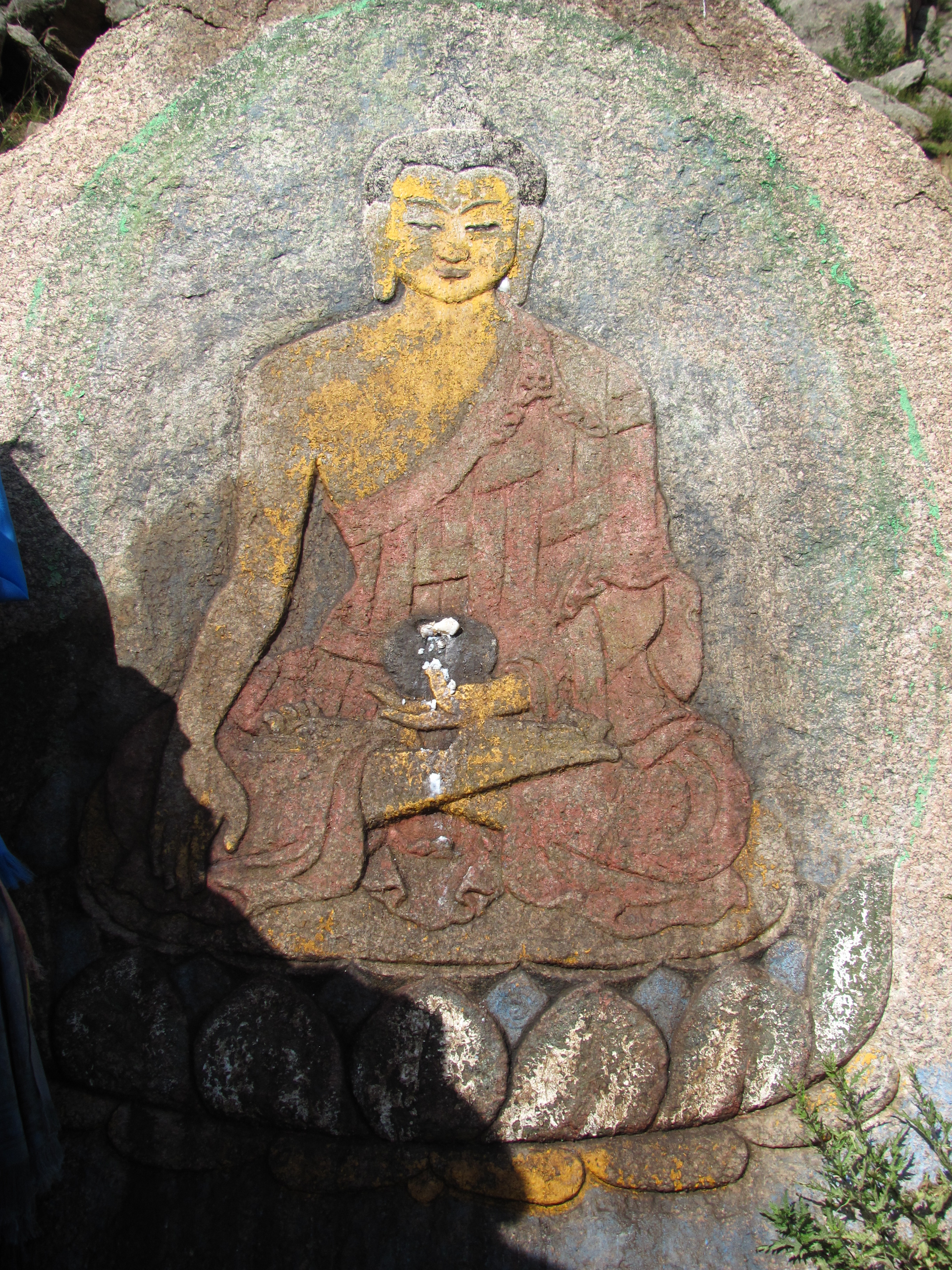
Image of Buddha

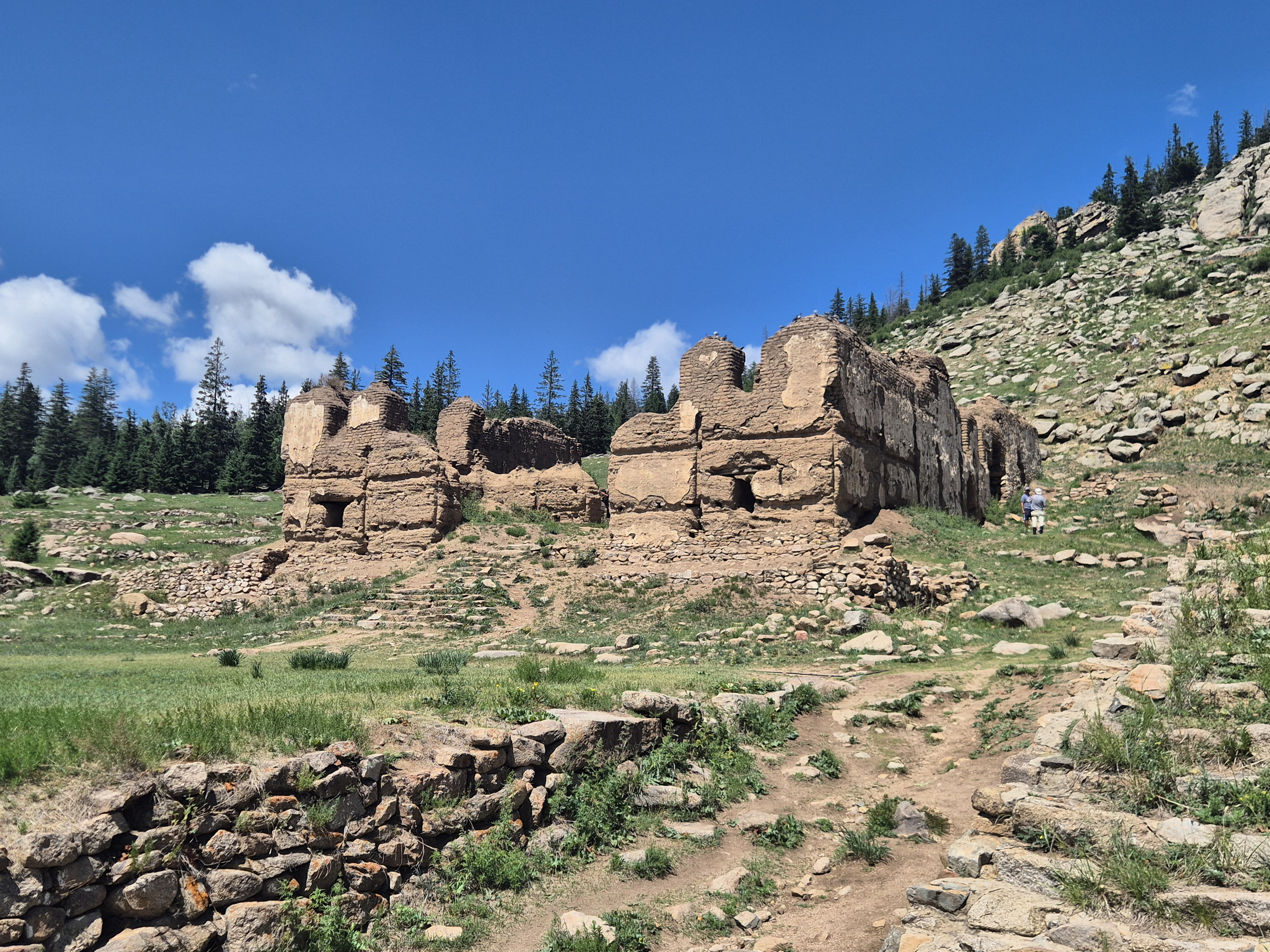
ruins of Togchin Temple

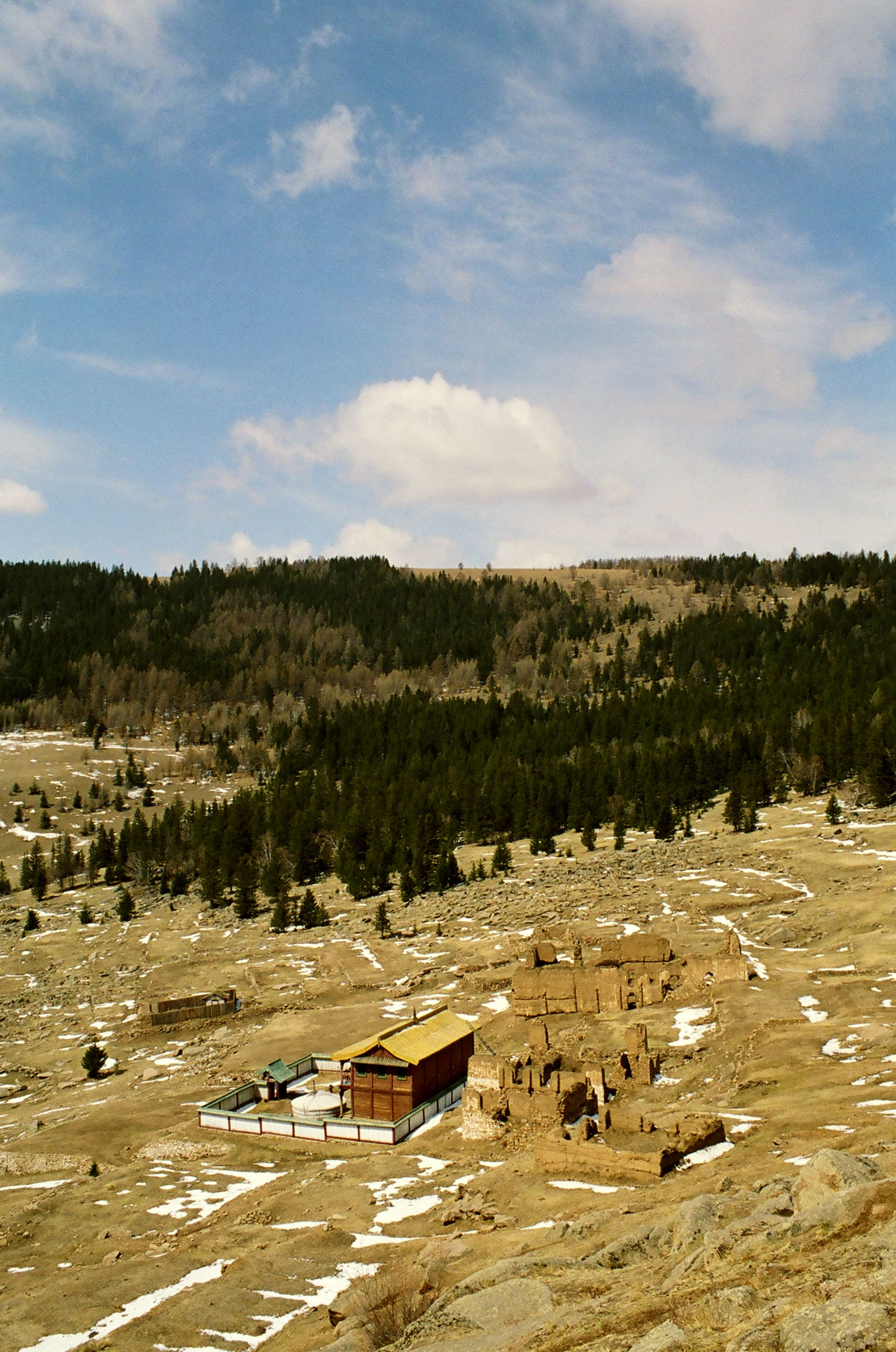
overview of monastery grounds

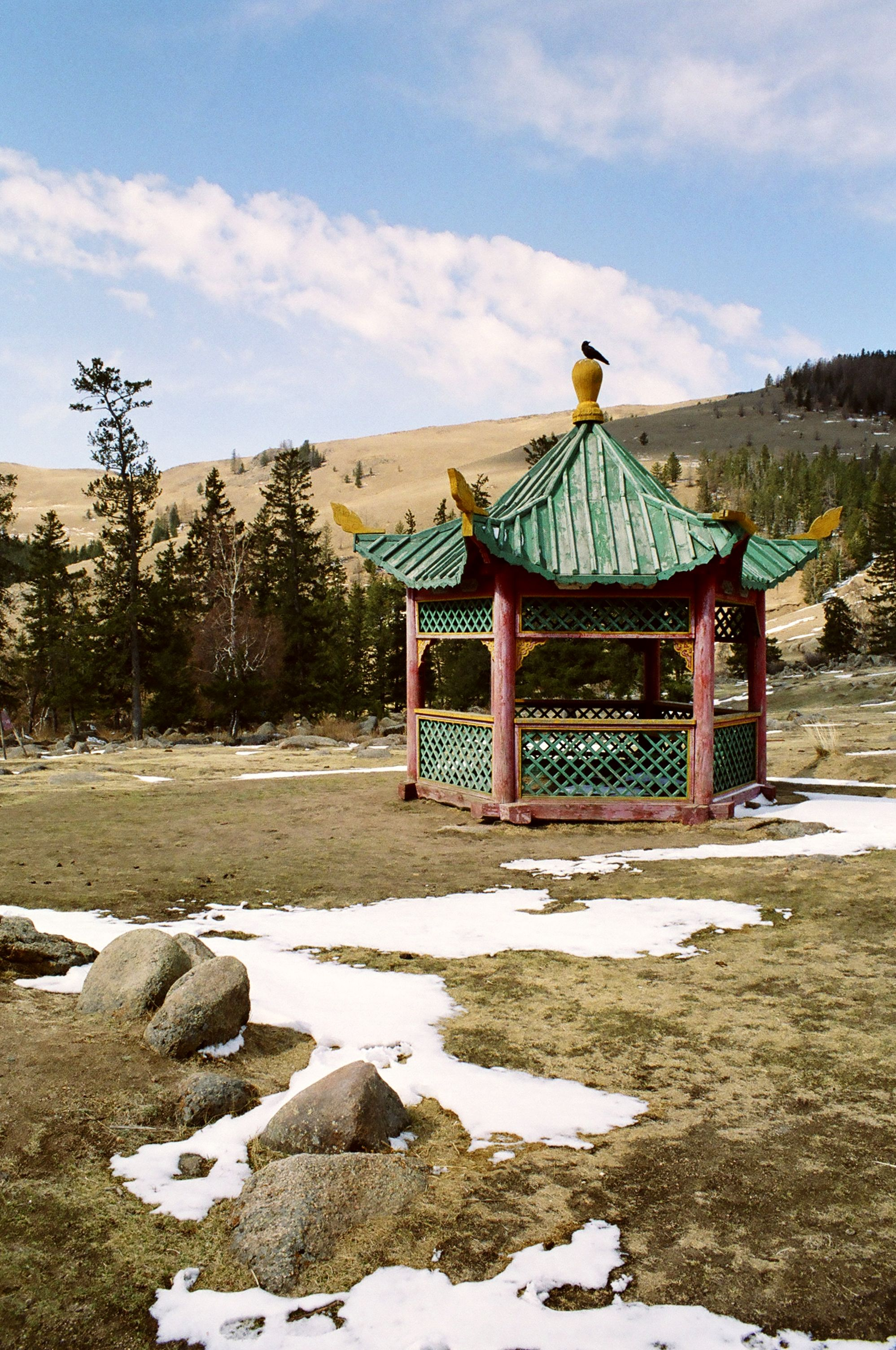
Pagoda

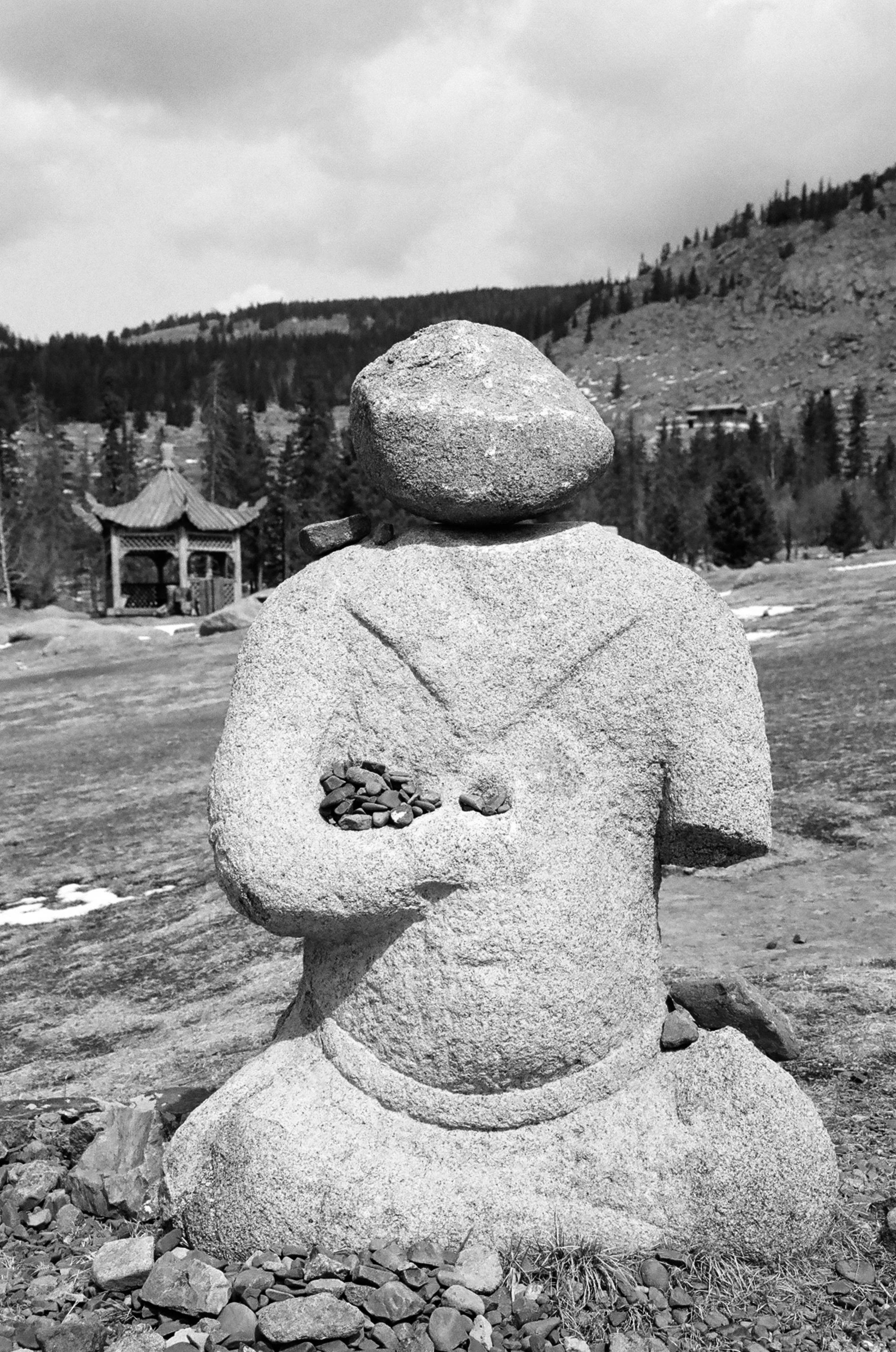
Buddha statue

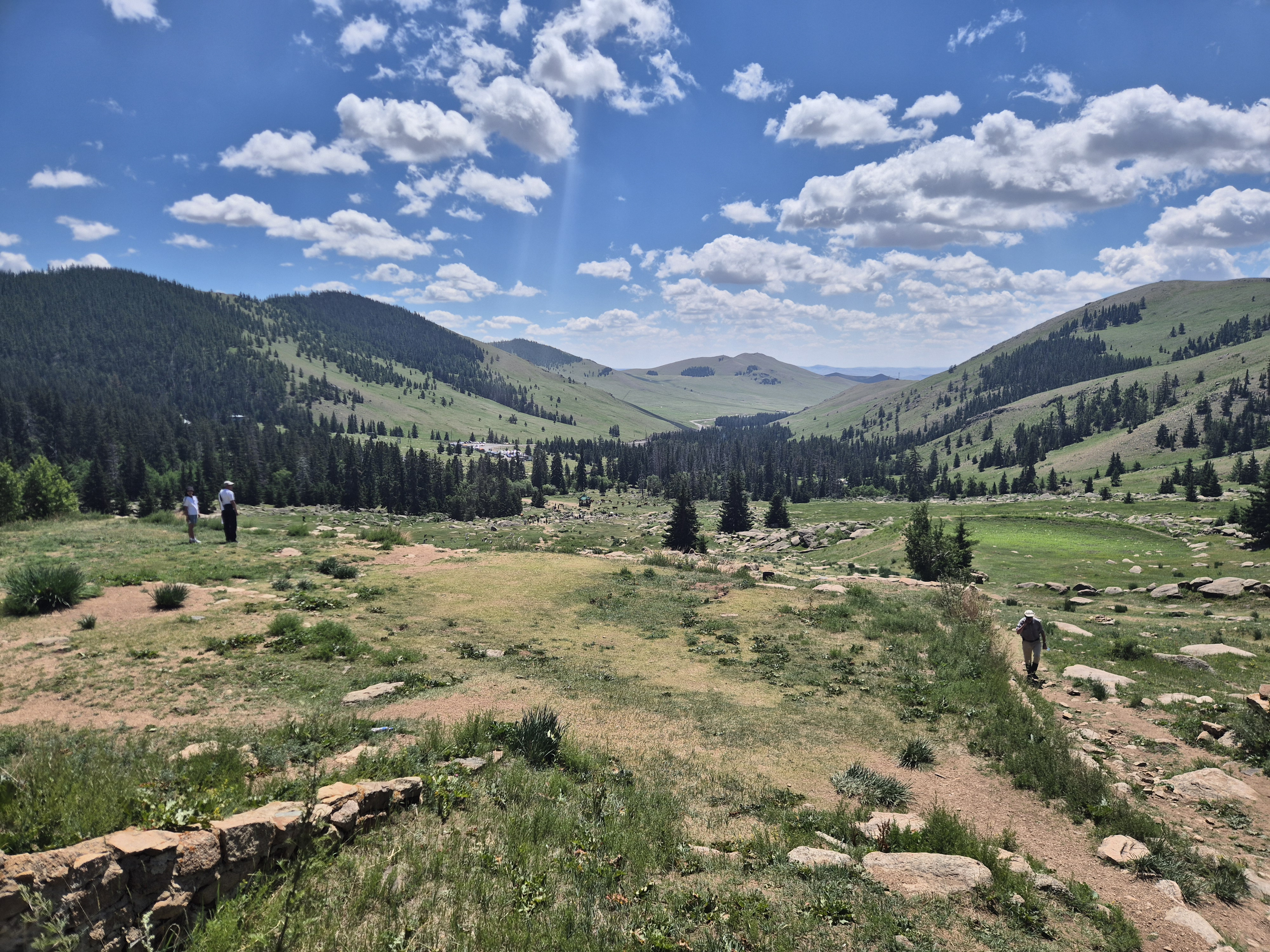
View of Bogd Khan Uul from the monastery

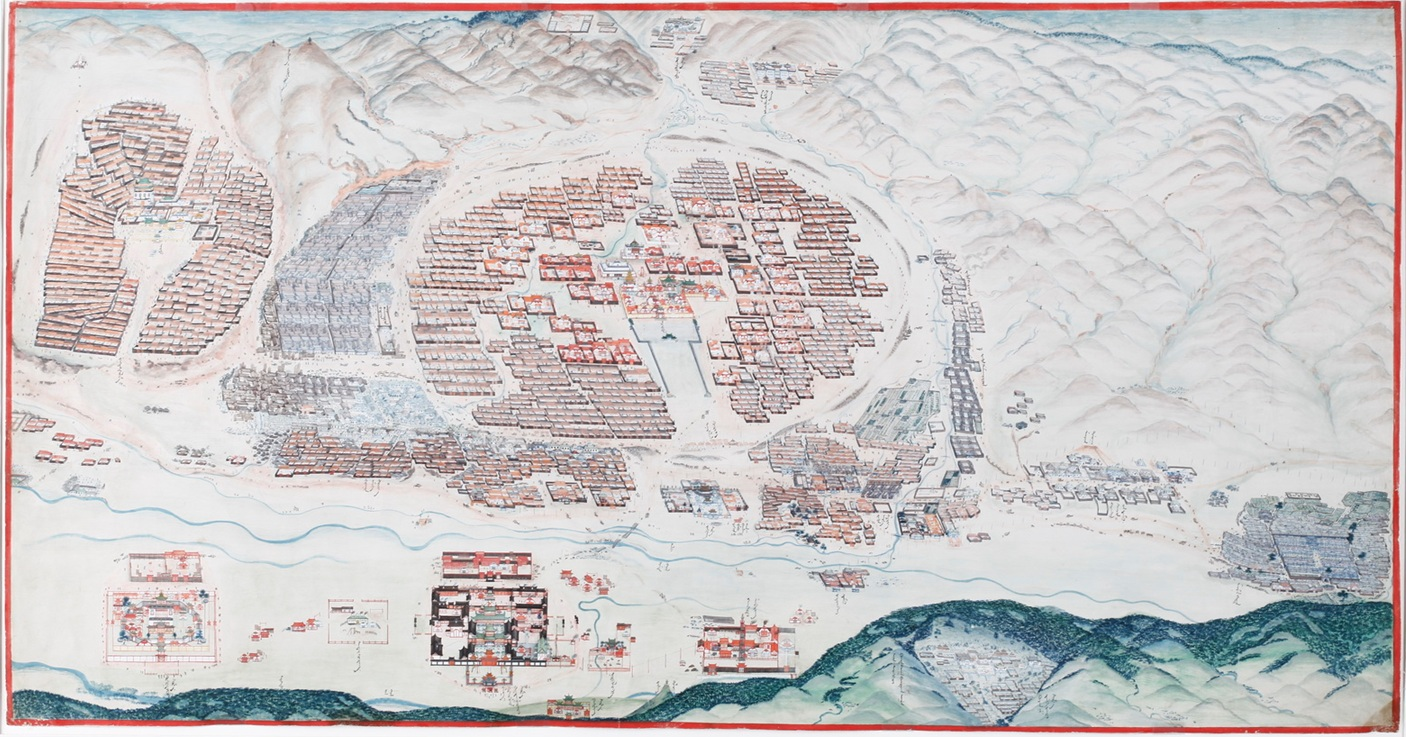
1913 painting showing the monastery at the bottom
