= Manzushir Khutagt Sambadondogiin Tserendorj =

Mongolian tulku, lama and politician (1872–1937)

Sambadondogiin Tserendorj
- Cамбадондогийн Цэрэндорж
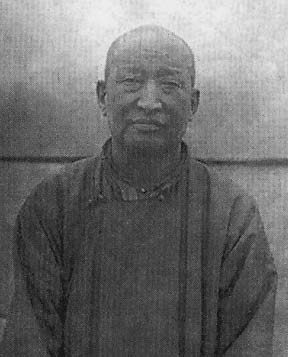
- Tserendorj in 1936–1937

Acting Prime Minister of Mongolia
- In office May 1921 – July 1921
- Preceded by: Jalkhanz Khutagt Sodnomyn Damdinbazar
- Succeeded by: Dogsomyn Bodoo

Personal details
- Born: 1872
- Died: October 1937 (aged 64–65) Ulaanbaatar, Mongolia

Sambadondogiin Tserendorj (Mongolian: Cамбадондогийн Цэрэндорж; 1872 – October 1937) was a Mongolian tulku, lama and politician who was the 6th reincarnation of the Donkor-Manjushri Gegen. He served as chief abbot of the Manjusri Monastery and later was the last acting prime minister of Outer Mongolia during Baron Ungern von Sternberg's occupation of Ikh Khŭree from May to July 1921. Later accused of counterrevolution, he was executed in 1937 at the start of the Stalinist repressions in Mongolia (1937–1939).

== Early life ==
Tserendorj, born in 1872, was recognized as the 6th reincarnate of the Donkor-Manjushri Gegen at the age of five and in 1880 took his place as abbot of Manjusri Monastery. In 1911, Tserendorj was a strong supporter of Mongolia's struggle for independence, but withdrew from public life once the proclamation of independence was made.

== Acting prime minister ==
In February 1921, Tserendorj safeguarded the Bogd Khan at Manjusri Monastery as forces loyal to the Baron Ungern von Sternberg drove occupying Chinese troops from Ikh Khŭree. With the restoration of autonomous Mongolian government in March 1921, the Bogd Khan once again became monarch of state. Prime Minister Damdinbazar was reassigned to minister of interior and sent west to fight White Russians alongside Khatanbaatar Magsarjav. Tserendorj became acting prime minister until July 1921 when Mongolian partisans commanded by Damdin Sukhbaatar and Red Army units defeated Baron Ungern von Sternberg's troops and occupied Ikh Khuree in what later became known as the Outer Mongolian Revolution of 1921.

== Later years and death ==
The Mongolian revolutionary government removed Tserendorj from his post. He once again took up his duties as chief abbot of Manjushri Monastery and maintained contact with a severely weakened (both physically and politically) Bogd Khan. In 1922 Tserendorj and the Bogd Khan supported a secret mission to contact the Japanese Emperor to request help against the increasing persecution of the Buddhist Church by the new government. In 1930, Tserendorj's personal property was seized as part of the government's rapid implementation of socialist policies. Tserendorj was arrested on charges of anti-government conspiracy and sentenced to 10 years in prison. In 1936 Khorloogiin Choibalsan's Interior Ministry accused him and 24 other lamas of being part of an "anti-revolutionary center". After a show trial that lasted nearly a year, Tserendorj was found guilty and executed in front of the Public Theater in early October 1937.

Political offices
Preceded by Jalkhanz Khutagt Sodnomyn Damdinbazar	Prime Minister of Mongolia; 1921	Succeeded by Dogsomyn Bodoo
