= Bogd Khan Uul Biosphere Reserve =

Nature reserve in Ulaanbaatar, Mongolia

- Богдхан уул ДЦГ
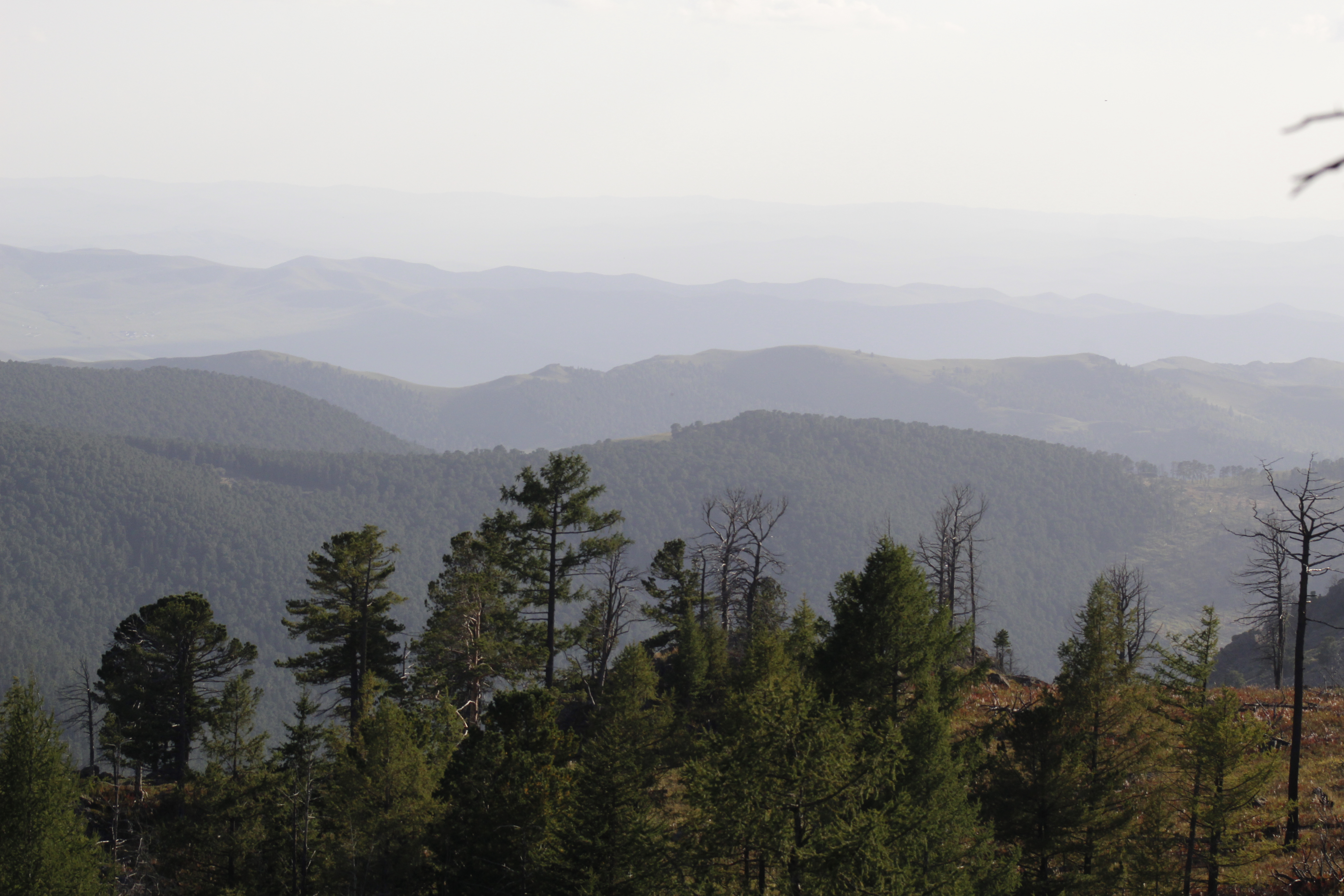
- View of the reserve from near Dugui Tsagaan

- Location within Mongolia
- Location: Ulaanbaatar, Mongolia
- Coordinates: 47°48′14″N 106°59′11″E
- Area: 67,300 ha (260 sq mi)
- Established: 1996

Bogd Khan Uul Biosphere Reserve is a nature reserve situated to the south of Ulaanbaatar in Mongolia. It is in the southern part of the forest steppe zone and is in the Khentii Mountains area. It includes Bogd Khan Mountain, and was designated as a UNESCO Biosphere Reserve in 1996.

== Description ==
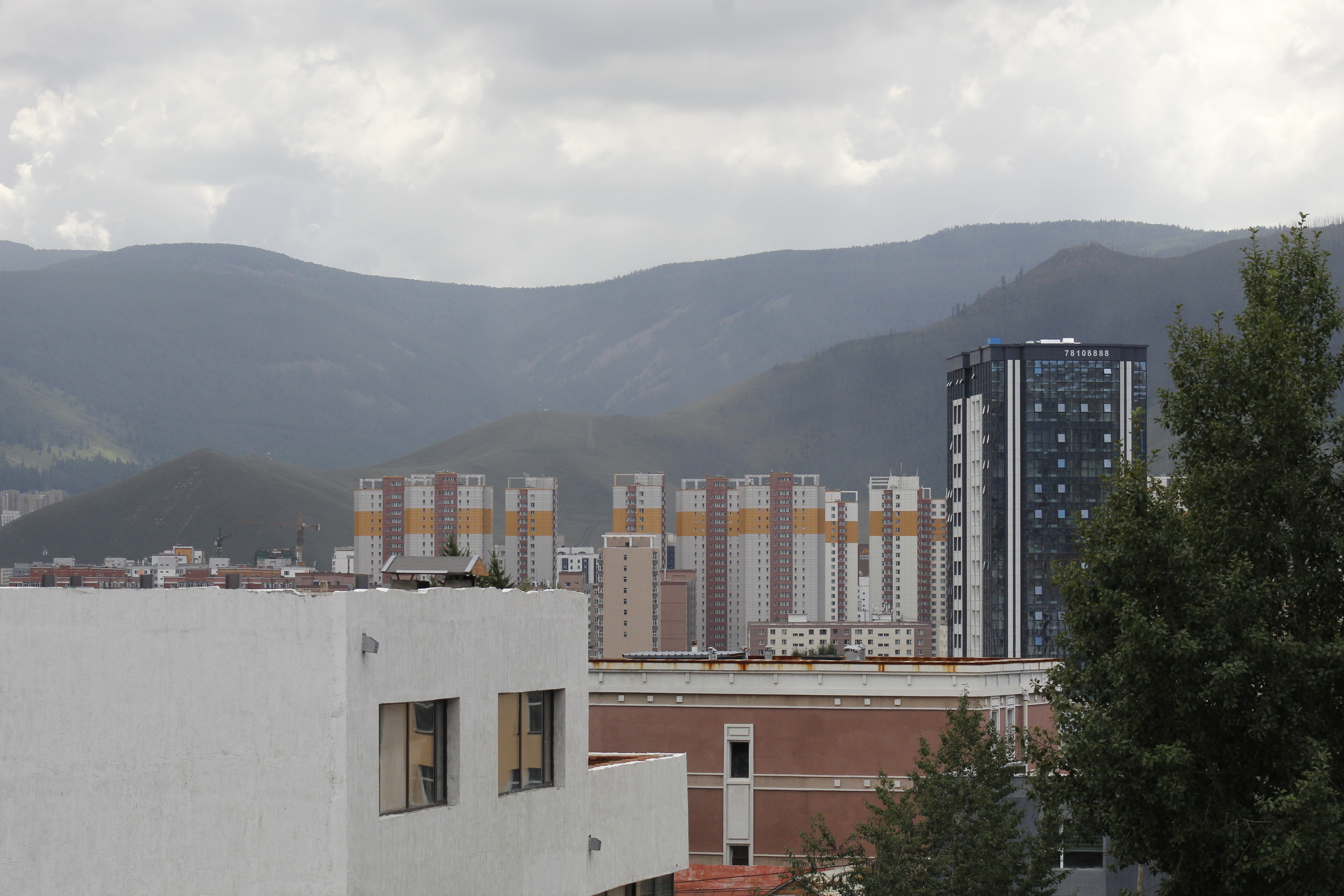
Northern slopes of Bogd Khan Mountain viewed from Ulaanbaatar

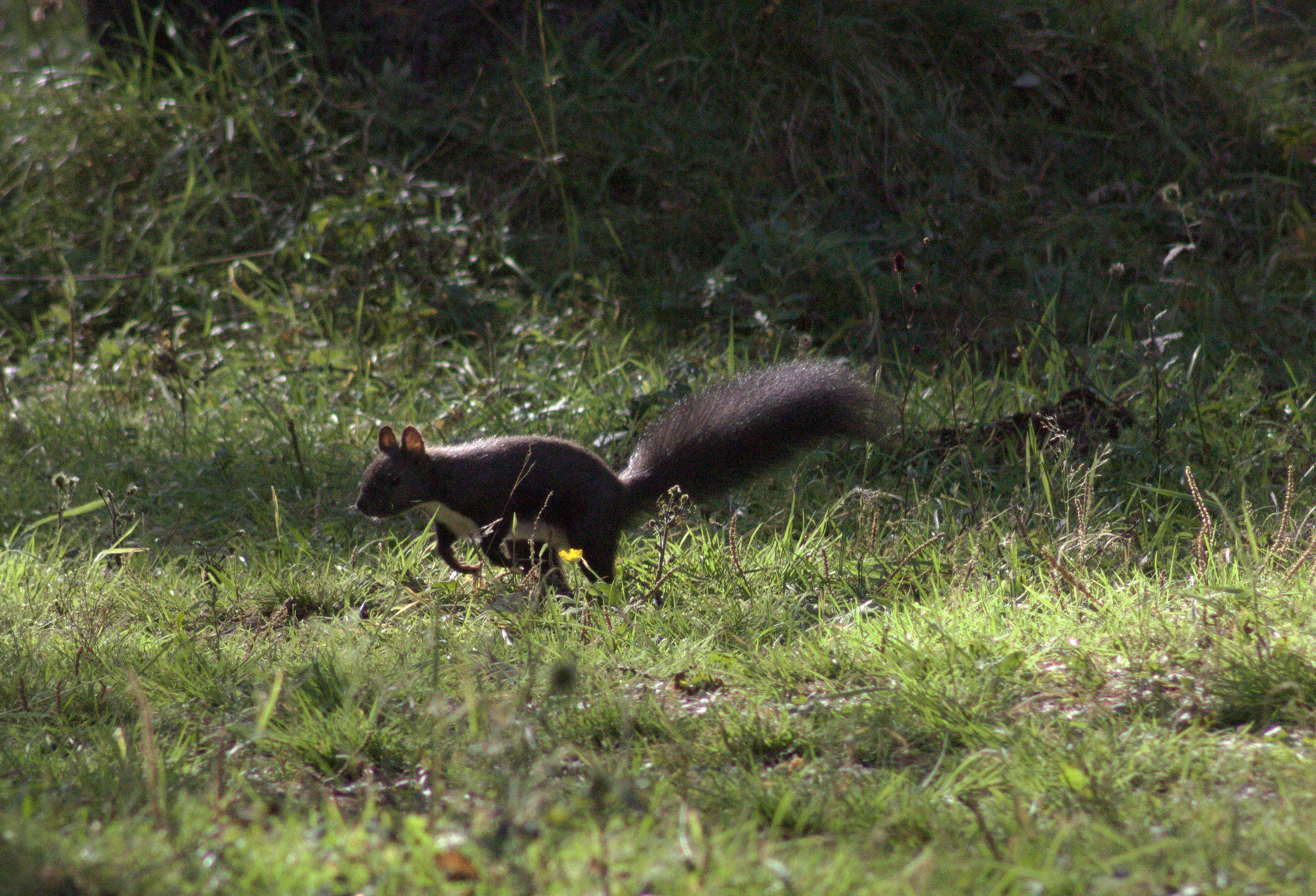
Red Squirrel seen in the reserve

Bogd Khan has a total area of 67,300 hectares (260 sq mi) and is located between 47°43' to 47°54'N and 106°46' to 107°10'E. Its altitudinal range is between 1,310 and 2,270 m (4,300 and 7,450 ft) above sea level. It consists of a core area of about 41,651 hectares (160.82 sq mi) surrounded by a buffer zone and certain transition areas. The northern slopes of Bogd Khan Mountain are covered with dense coniferous forests while the southern side is bare rock.

== History ==
Environmental protection on Bogd Khan Mountain dates back at least to the thirteenth century when the Tooril Khan ruler of the Keraites forbade logging and hunting there, claiming that Bogd Khan was a holy mountain. Since then, the mountain has been venerated, and local people neither hunted on the mountain nor harvested the timber. In 1778 the Mongolian governor of what is now Ulan-Bator petitioned the Qianlong Emperor requesting approval to hold twice yearly ceremonies dedicated to Mount Bogd Khan Uul. Permission was granted eight days later for ceremonies to be held twice annually. In 1783, the local government of the Qing dynasty approved the petition.

Bogd Khan Uul was declared a biosphere reserve by UNESCO in 1996. A biosphere reserve aims to "develop and implement sustainable development approaches" and encourage "ecological and cultural diversity", by integrating the needs of local communities with the preservation of the environment. The core area is strictly protected, the buffer zone is used for activities that are compatible with good ecological practices and the transition zone allows ecologically sustainable activities to take place.

== Flora and fauna ==
The reserve has a number of habitat types including grassland, taiga vegetation, Alpine tundra and bare rock. In some areas there are mixed forest with larch (Larix sibirica), birch (Betula spp.), "Pinus sibirica" ("cedar" common Russian name) (Pinus spp.), pine (Pinus spp.) and poplar (Populus spp.).

Some of the most threatened mammals in the reserve are the musk deer (Moschus moschiferus), the roe deer (Capreolus capreolus), the sable (Martes zibellina) and the Arctic hare (Lepus timidus).
