= Bogd Khan Mountain =

Mountain south of Ulaanbaatar, Mongolia

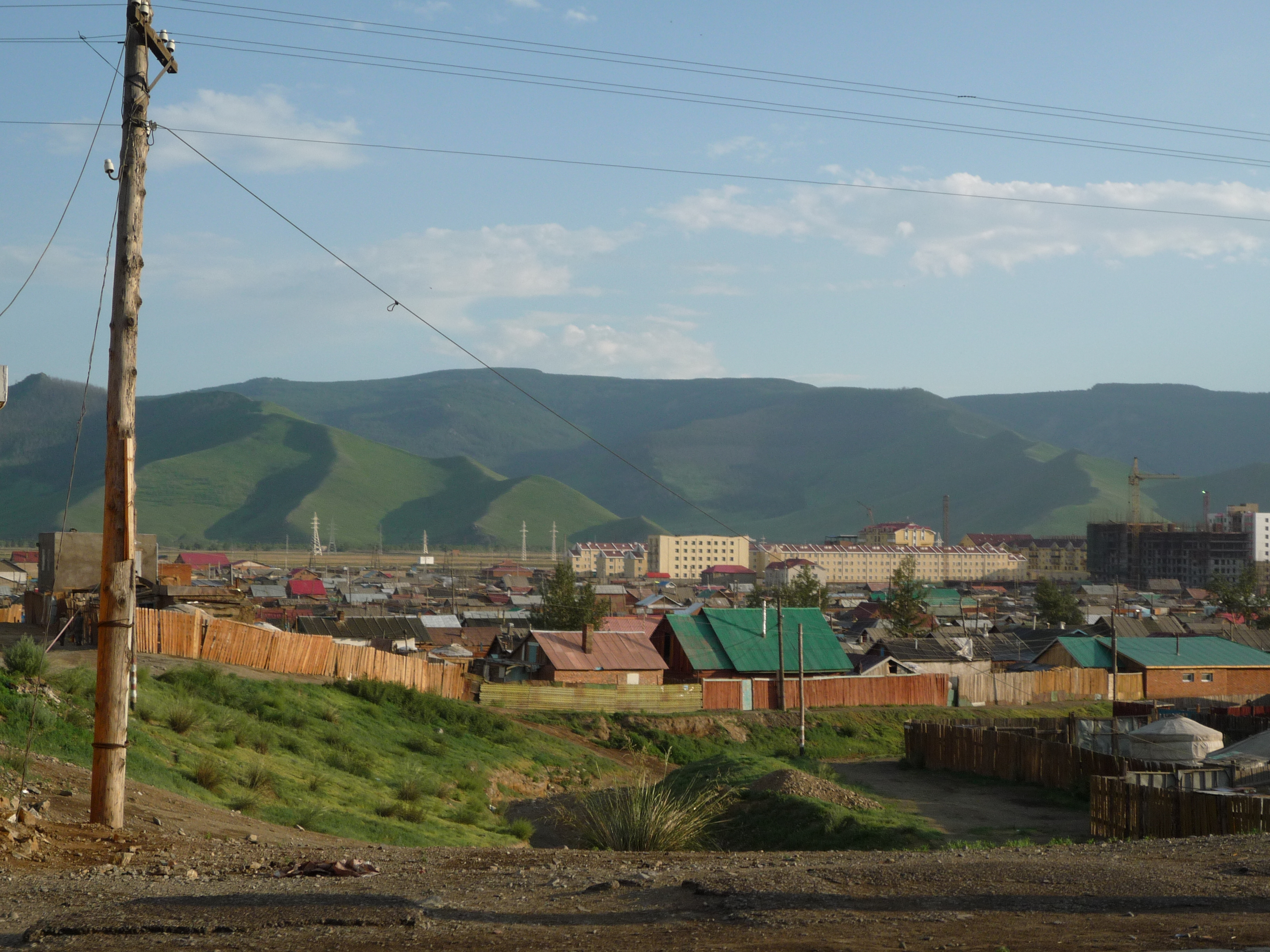
- North side of Bogd Khan, viewed from Ulaanbaatar

Highest point
- Elevation: 2,261 m (7,418 ft)
- Coordinates: 47°48′14″N 106°59′11″E

Geography
- Location within Mongolia
- Location: Mongolia
- Parent range: Khentii Mountains

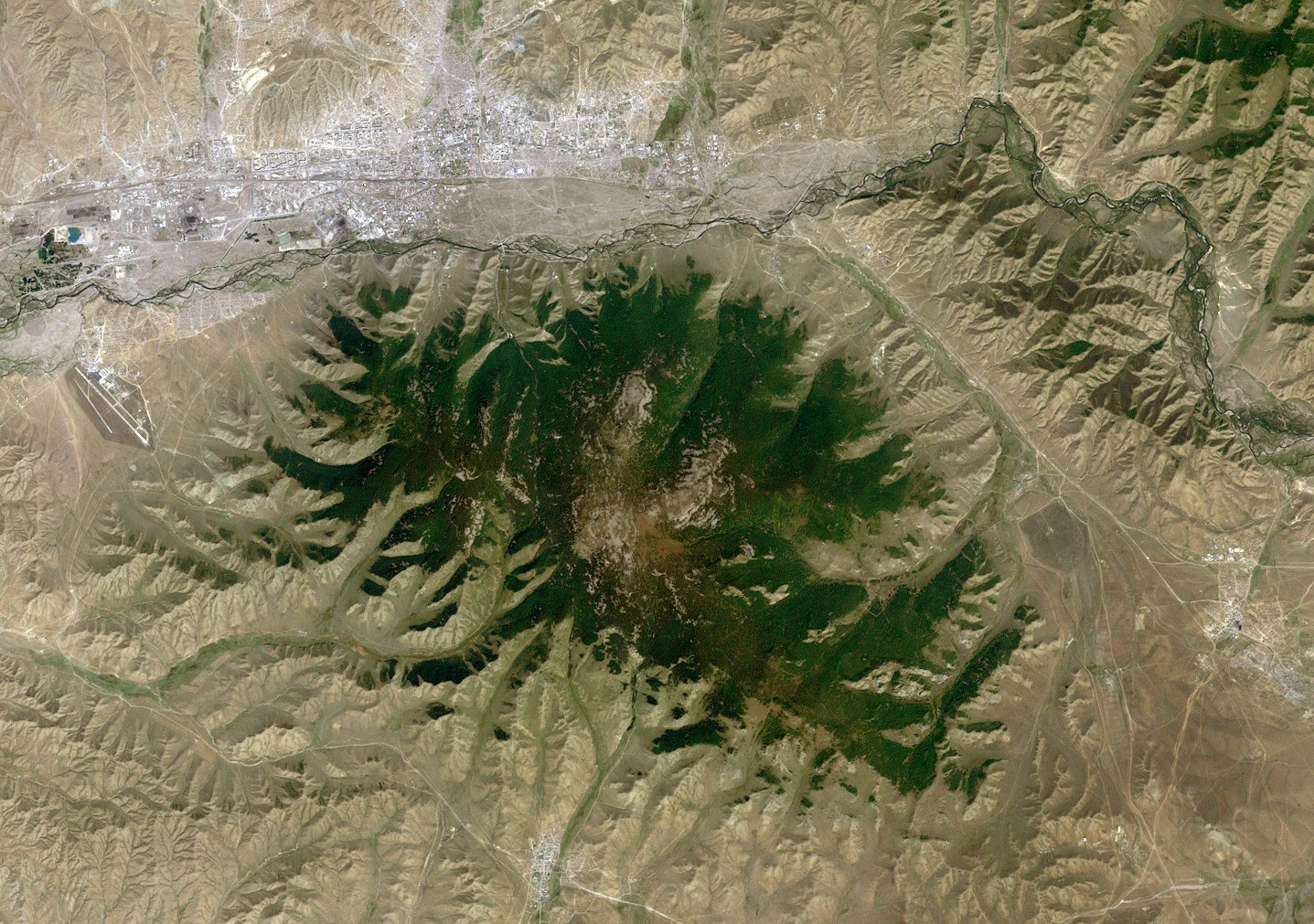
A satellite image, showing Bogd Khan Mountain in the center, Ulaanbaatar in the northwest corner, Tuul River running between the city and the mountain, the town of Zuunmod south of the mountain, the town of Nalaikh east of the mountain, and Buyant-Ukhaa International Airport west of the mountain

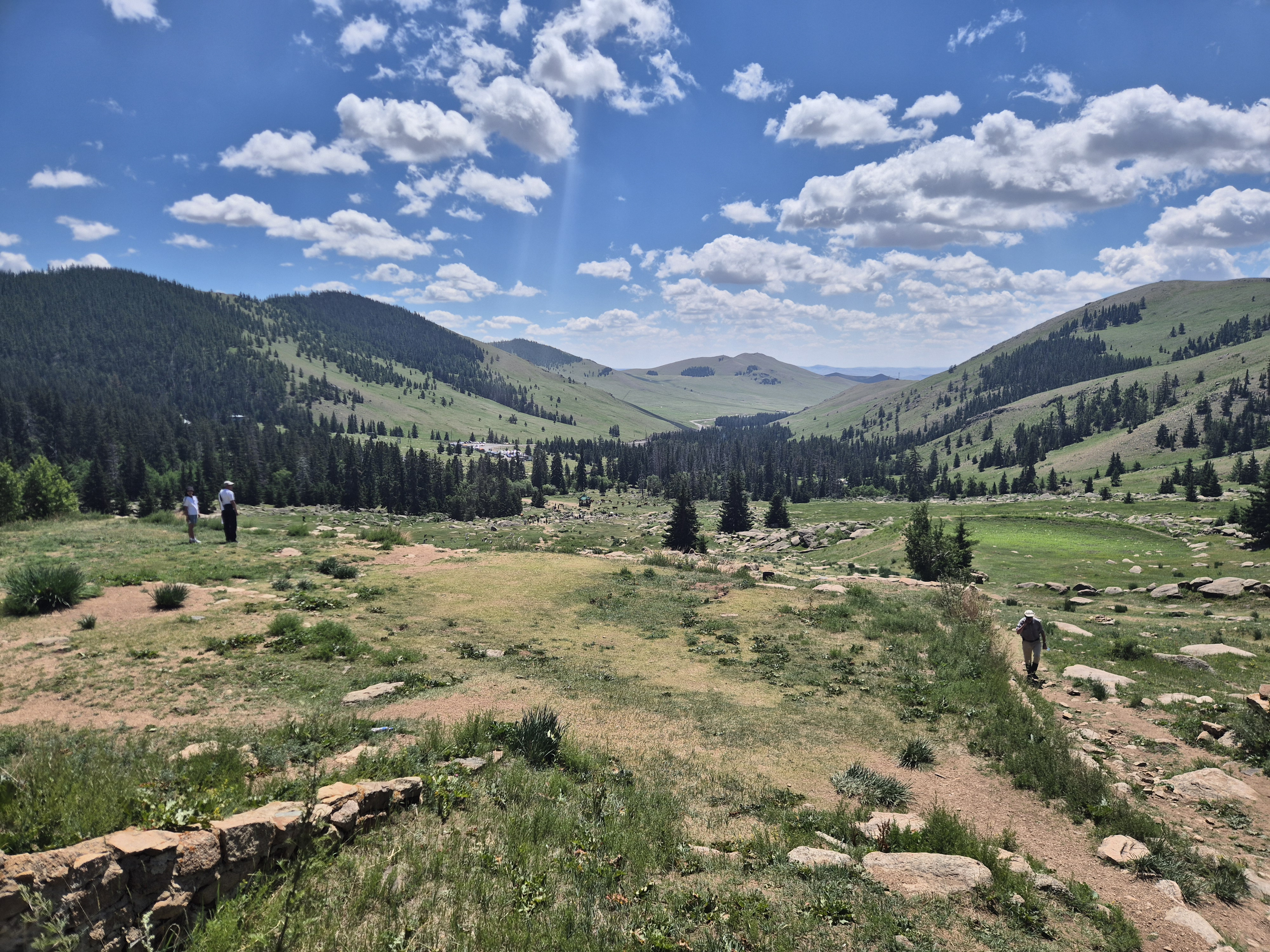
Hills near Manjusri Monastery

Bogd Khan Mountain (Mongolian: Богд хан-уул; lit. 'Mount St. Khan') is a mountain in southwestern part of the Khentii Mountains, Mongolia that overlooks the nation's capital, Ulaanbaatar, from a height of 2,261 metres (7,418 ft) to the south of the city.

The mountain lies within the Bogd Khan Uul Biosphere Reserve.

== Protection and Zanabazar's two pavilions ==
Mount Bogd Khan Uul was first protected during Zanabazar's time. Zanabazar was said to have meditated under a tree called Janchivsembe in Nukht Valley of Mount Bogd Khan Uul. In 1681, Russian envoy V.S.Turskii, the son of a landowner from Tobolsk, was sent to visit Zanabazar and his elder brother Tüsheet Khan Chankhuundorj. In his report, Turski made the following notes for the period from June 2 to 16, 1681 (describing two pavilions built somewhere between the current Sky Resort and MCS Coca-Cola Plant in eastern Ulaanbaatar):

Near the Selbe river Darkhan Tabunang I travelled with the zaisan, son-in-law of the Tusheet Khan, who was on the move with around 60 of his families. They had come to the Uliastai river which flows into the Tuul river. We arrived in the Uliastai river valley, not far from the Tuul river. On the banks of the Tuul river the Zanabazar has two pavilions. Floors in those pavilions are wooden, walls are bricked on one side, windows are wooden lattice, and roofs are made of stone tiles. On the other side of those pavilions there is a tall mountain called Khan Uul Mountain which is strictly protected. In its forests there are all sorts of animals but hunting them is prohibited.

In 1709, Bogd Khan Uul was designated as one of twelve Mongolian mountains "protected from hunting, cultivation and timber felling."

== Imperial recognition ==
In 1778, the Mongolian governor (minister) of Khuree (Urga, present-day Ulaanbaatar) Sanzaidorj sent a letter to the Qianlong Emperor requesting approval of annual ceremonies dedicated to Mount Bogd Khan Uul. The Mongolian letter and the reply from Beijing (in Mongolian) are both kept at the National Archives of Mongolia.

The text of governor Sanzaidorj's letter reads:

Your servant San and us hereby raise and pronounce this earnestly. Reason for begging Royal Decree: Upon inspection, in the south of Khuree there is a certain Khan Uul. This mountain is very big. Whenever the four Khanates (Aimag) of the Khalkha gather in assembly, this mountain is the place they point to as the gathering place. And the multitudes of lamas and disciples of the Jebtsundamba Khutuktu all reside here. The word handed down among the locals here says: 'This mountain is called Khan Uul because Genghis Khan had lived there originally'. Indeed the many princes, dukes, banner governors, saints, and disciples of the Khalkha all regard this mountain as marvelous, and the former old Khutugtu (Zanabazar) himself worshipped it. The many locals here choose not to hunt the animals of the mountain as they feel they are not entitled to do so, nor do they move the trees as they feel they have no right to do so. Your servant Sanzaidorj and the lamas worshipped the mountain each year, as do each of the princes, dukes, and banner governors who come to participate in the assembly. As your servants see it, if the Lord sends incense and all the necessary silk from the relevant ministry and ensures officially funded annual worship ceremonies, that would greatly benefit the many people here. The many princes, dukes, banner governors, and lamas have discussed this matter and agree in totality. Therefore, we, your servants, joyously say to each other now that it is fitting for us to await your Divine Lordship’s unbending charity and blessing. Upon inspection, Mosuur Pass, Mount Geden and Mount Altai are all currently being worshipped by official funds. Since all the saints and disciples of the four Khanates of the Khalkha are earnest in saying that Khan Uul is marvelous, please allow officially funded annual worship ceremonies in the same way as has been done for Mosuur Pass. If dispatches are sent as requested, when you servants here receive incense and all the necessary silk from your ministry twice a year - in spring and autumn - cows, sheep, and the like can be provided as a token of appreciation. Pronounced earnestly for this reason, we beg for a Royal Decree. 17th day of the 9th month of the 43rd year (1778) of Tengeriig Tetgesen (Qianlong reign period)

The Board for Administration of Outlying Regions in Beijing accepted the petition in 1783. They wrote in their reply:

Note of the Gadagadu Muji-yi Zasahu Jurgan (Board for the Administration of Outlying Regions). Sent to the Ministers residing in Khuree. Copy obtained from the Interior Ministry. A Royal Decree was issued on the 25th day of the 9th month of the 43rd year of Tengeriig Tetgesen, saying: From the administration of Sanzaidorj we have received the pronouncement that in the south of Khuree there is a certain Khan Uul. All the princes, dukes, banner governors, saints, and disciples of the Khalkha are earnest in saying that this mountain is marvelous. Upon review, it has been raised, pronounced and asked that incense and all the necessary silk be sent from the interior in order for worship ceremonies to be held in the same way as is legally done for Mosuur Pass. Without delay, the Ceremony Ministry is ordered that twice a year - in spring and autumn - in accordance with the request raised by Sanzaidorj, incense and all the necessary silk are to be sent to Sanzaidorj and his counterparts while other necessary materials are to be provided and prepared there. Then, with the princes, dukes, and banner governors present, the worshipping ceremonies are to be held. Earnestly obeying this Decree, a copy has been sent to this Board. Therefore, we have sent it to the Ceremony Ministry to examine and implement the contents of the Decree. We have also determined that it should be sent and made known to the Household Department and to the Ministers residing in Khuree. Sent for this reason. 29th day of the 9th month of the 43rd year (1778) of Tengeriig Tetgesen (Qianlong reign period)

== Modern recognition ==
Bogd Khan Mountain, along with Mongolia's other sacred mountains Burkhan Khaldun and Otgontenger, was added to the country's UNESCO World Heritage Tentative List on August 6, 1996, in the Cultural category. World Heritage sites are those that exhibit universal natural or cultural significance, or both.
