= Mongolia =

Country in East Asia

Mongolia Монгол Улс ᠮᠤᠩᠭᠤᠯ ᠤᠯᠤᠰ
- Flag Emblem
- Anthem: Монгол Улсын Төрийн дуулал Mongol ulsiin töriin duulal "National Anthem of Mongolia"
- State seal

- Capital and largest city: Ulaanbaatar (Note: Also spelled as "Ulan Bator"); 47°55′19″N 106°54′55″E
- Official languages: Mongolian
- Official scripts: Cyrillic; Mongolian
- Ethnic groups (2020): 95.6% Mongols; 3.8% Kazakhs; 0.6% other
- Religion (2020): 51.7% Buddhism; 40.6% No religion; 3.2% Islam; 2.5% Shamanism; 1.3% Christianity; 0.7% other
- Demonym: Mongolian
- Government: Unitary semi-presidential republic
  - President: Sandagiin Byambatsogt (acting)
  - Prime Minister: Nyam-Osoryn Uchral
  - Chairman of the State Great Khural: Sandagiin Byambatsogt
- Legislature: State Great Khural

Formation
  - Mongol Empire: 1206
  - Yuan dynasty: 1271
  - Northern Yuan: 1368
  - Completion of Qing conquest: 1691
  - Declaration of independence from the Qing dynasty: 29 December 1911
  - Mongolian People's Republic established: 26 November 1924
  - Current constitution: 12 February 1992

Area
  - Total: 1,564,116 km^{2} (603,909 sq mi) (18th)
  - Water (%): 0.67

Population
  - 2025 estimate: ▲3,591,120 (131st)
  - Density: 2.24/km^{2} (5.8/sq mi)
- GDP (PPP): 2025 estimate
  - Total: ▲$73.280 billion (113th)
  - Per capita: ▲$20,450 (90th)
- GDP (nominal): 2025 estimate
  - Total: ▲$25.800 billion (118th)
  - Per capita: ▲$7,200 (97th)
- Gini (2022): 31.4 medium inequality
- HDI (2023): ▲0.747 high (104th)
- Currency: Tögrög (MNT)
- Time zone: UTC+7/+8
- Calling code: +976
- ISO 3166 code: MN
- Internet TLD: .mn, .мон

Mongolia (Note: Mongolian: Монгол Улс, romanized: Mongol Uls; Mongolian script: ᠮᠤᠩᠭᠤᠯ ᠤᠯᠤᠰ, Mongolian pronunciation: [mɔŋɢəɮ ʊɮs], moŋɣol ulus; lit. "Mongol Nation" or "State of Mongolia" /mɒŋˈɡoʊliə/ mong-GOH-lee-ə) (Note: ᡏᡆᡊᡎᡆᠯ ᡇᠯᡇᠰ (Oirat); Моңһл Улс (Oirat); Монгол Улас (Buryat)) is a landlocked country in East Asia. It is bordered by Russia to the north and China to the south and covers an area of 1,564,116 square kilometers (603,909 square miles), making it the 18th-largest country in the world and the second largest landlocked nation after Kazakhstan, as well as the largest landlocked country that does not border an inland sea. With a population of 3.5 million, Mongolia is the world's most sparsely populated sovereign state. The country constitutes a significant portion of the Mongolian Plateau, and its natural environment is characterized by grassy steppe, mountains to the north and west, and the Gobi Desert to the south. Ulaanbaatar, the capital and largest city, is home to roughly half of the country's population.

The territory of modern-day Mongolia has been ruled by various nomadic empires, including the Xiongnu, the Xianbei, the Rouran Khaganate, the First Turkic Khaganate, the Second Turkic Khaganate, the Uyghur Khaganate and others. In 1206, Genghis Khan founded the Mongol Empire, which became the largest contiguous land empire in history. His grandson Kublai Khan conquered China proper and established the Yuan dynasty. After the collapse of the Yuan, the Mongols retreated to Mongolia and resumed their earlier pattern of factional conflict, except during the era of Dayan Khan and Tumen Zasagt Khan.

In the 16th century, Tibetan Buddhism spread to Mongolia. The Qing dynasty absorbed the country in the 17th century. By the early 20th century, almost one-third of the adult male population were Buddhist monks. After the collapse of the Qing dynasty in 1911, Mongolia declared independence and achieved actual independence from the Republic of China in 1921. Shortly thereafter, the country became a satellite state of the Soviet Union. In 1924, the Mongolian People's Republic was founded as a socialist state. After the anti-communist revolutions of 1989, Mongolia conducted its own peaceful democratic revolution in 1990. This led to a multi-party system, a new constitution of 1992, and transition to a market economy.

Approximately 30% of the population is nomadic or semi-nomadic; horse culture remains integral. Mahayana Buddhism is the majority religion (51.7%), with the irreligious being the second-largest group (40.6%). Islam is the third-largest religious identification (3.2%), concentrated among ethnic Kazakhs. The vast majority of citizens are ethnic Mongols, with roughly 5% of the population being Kazakhs, Tuvans, and other ethnic minorities, who are especially concentrated in the western regions. Mongolia is a member of the United Nations, Asia Cooperation Dialogue, G77, Asian Infrastructure Investment Bank, Non-Aligned Movement and a NATO global partner. Mongolia joined the World Trade Organization in 1997 and seeks to expand its participation in regional economic and trade groups.

== Etymology ==
The name Mongolia means the "Land of the Mongols" in Latin. The Mongolian word "Mongol" (монгол) is of uncertain etymology. Sükhbataar (1992) and de la Vaissière (2021) propose it is a derivation from Mugulü, the 4th-century founder of the Rouran Khaganate, first attested as the 'Mungu', (Chinese: 蒙兀, Modern Chinese Měngwù, Middle Chinese Muwngu), a branch of the Shiwei in an 8th-century Tang dynasty list of northern tribes, presumably related to the Liao-era Mungku (Chinese: 蒙古, Modern Chinese Měnggǔ, Middle Chinese MuwngkuX).

After the fall of the Liao dynasty in 1125, the Khamag Mongols became a leading tribe on the Mongolian Plateau. However, their wars with the Jurchen-ruled Jin dynasty and the Tatar confederation had weakened them. The last head of the tribe was Yesügei, whose son Temüjin (Genghis Khan) eventually united all the Shiwei tribes as the Mongol Empire (Yekhe Monggol Ulus). In the 13th century, the word Mongol grew into an umbrella term for a large group of Mongolic-speaking tribes united under the rule of Genghis Khan.

Since the adoption of the Constitution of Mongolia in 1992, the official name of the state is "Mongolia" (Mongol Uls).

== History ==
=== Prehistory and antiquity ===
The Khoit Tsenkher Cave in Khovd Province shows lively pink, brown, and red ocher paintings (dated to 20,000 years ago) of mammoths, lynx, bactrian camels, and ostriches, earning it the nickname "the Lascaux of Mongolia". The Venus figurines of Mal'ta (21,000 years ago) testify to the level of Upper Paleolithic art in northern Mongolia; Mal'ta is now part of Russia. Neolithic agricultural settlements (c. 5500–3500 BC), such as those at Norovlin, Tamsagbulag, Bayanzag, and Rashaan Khad, predate the introduction of horse-riding nomadism, a pivotal event in the history of Mongolia which became the dominant culture. The ethnogenesis of Mongolic peoples is largely linked with the expansion of Ancient Northeast Asians. The pastoralist lifestyle may in part be derived from the Western Steppe Herders but without much geneflow between these two groups, suggesting cultural transmission.

Horse-riding nomadism has been documented during the Copper and Bronze Age Afanasevo culture (3500–2500 BC); this Indo-European culture was active to the Khangai Mountains in central Mongolia. The wheeled vehicles found in the burials of the Afanasevans have been dated to before 2200 BC. Pastoral nomadism and metalworking became more developed with the Okunev culture (2nd millennium BC), Andronovo culture (2300–1000 BC) and Karasuk culture (1500–300 BC), culminating with the Iron Age Xiongnu Empire in 209 BC. Monuments of the pre-Xiongnu Bronze Age include deer stones, khirigsuur kurgans, square slab tombs, and rock paintings.

Although cultivation of crops has continued since the Neolithic period, agriculture has always remained small in scale compared to pastoral nomadism. Agriculture may have first been introduced from the west or arose independently in the region. The population during the Copper Age has been described as mongoloid in the east of what is now Mongolia, and as europoid in the west. Tocharians (Yuezhi) and Scythians inhabited western Mongolia during the Bronze Age. The mummy of a Scythian warrior, which is believed to be about 2,500 years old, was a 30- to 40-year-old man with blond hair; it was found in the Altai Mountains. As equine nomadism was introduced, the political center of the Eurasian Steppe shifted to Mongolia, where it remained until the 18th century. The intrusions of northern pastoralists (e.g. the Guifang, Shanrong, and Donghu) into China during the Shang dynasty (1600–1046 BC) and Zhou dynasty (1046–256 BC) presaged the age of nomadic empires.

=== Early states ===
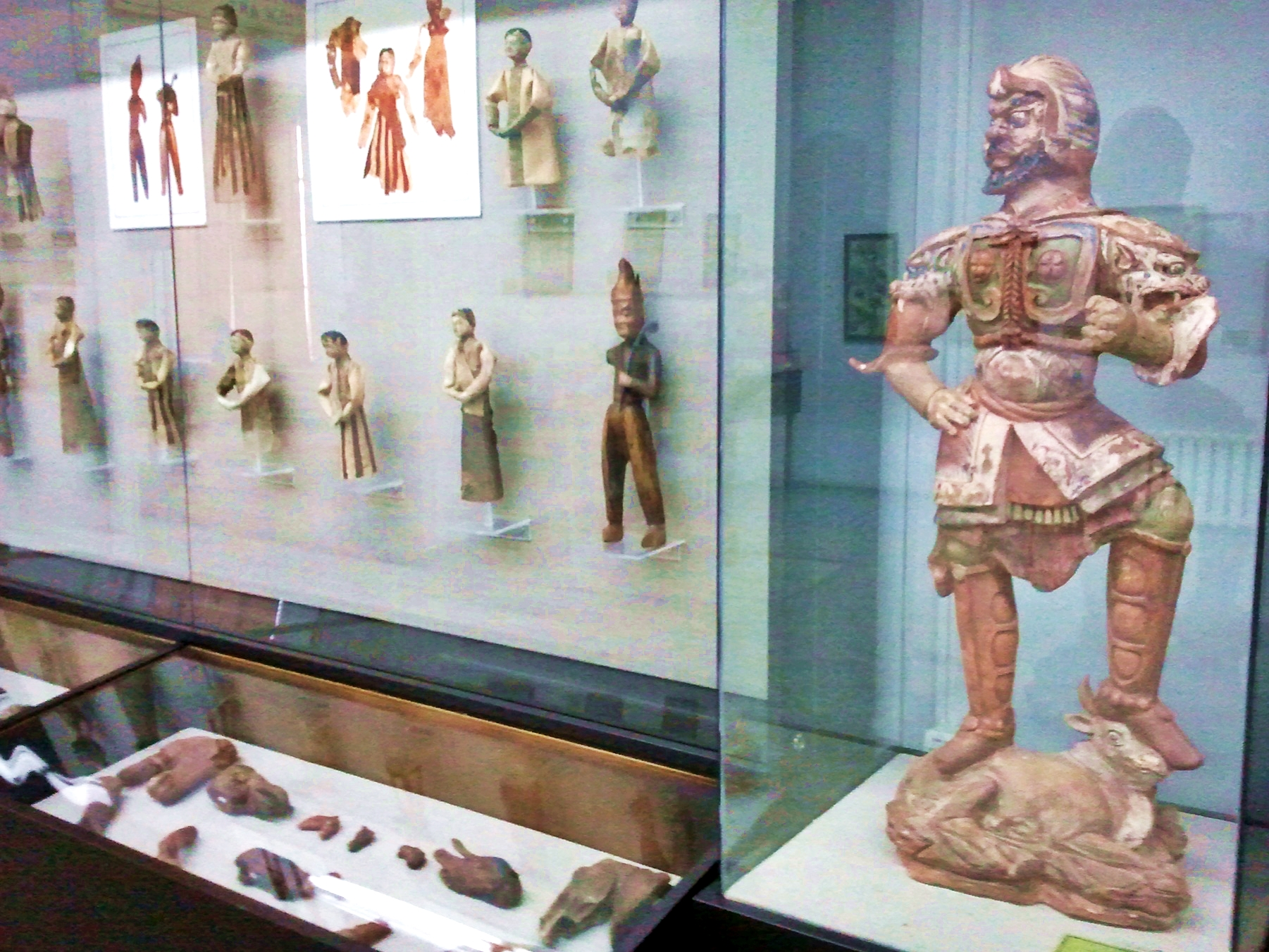
7th-century Göktürk artifacts found 180 km (112 mi) from Ulaanbaatar

Since prehistoric times, Mongolia has been inhabited by nomads who, from time to time, formed great confederations that rose to power and prominence. Common institutions were the office of the Khan, the Kurultai (Supreme Council), left and right wings, imperial army (Kheshig) and the decimal military system. The first of these empires, the Xiongnu of undetermined ethnicity, were brought together by Modu Shanyu to form a confederation in 209 BC. They emerged as the greatest threat to the Qin dynasty, forcing the latter to construct the Great Wall of China. It was guarded by up to almost 300,000 soldiers during Marshal Meng Tian's tenure, as a means of defense against the destructive Xiongnu raids. The vast Xiongnu empire (209 BC–93 AD) was followed by the Mongolic Xianbei empire (93–234), which also ruled more than the entirety of present-day Mongolia. The Rouran Khaganate (330–555) of Xianbei provenance was the first to use "Khagan" as an imperial title. It ruled a massive empire before being defeated by the Göktürks (555–745), an even larger empire.

The Göktürks laid siege to Panticapaeum, present-day Kerch, in 576. They were succeeded by the Uyghur Khaganate (745–840) who were defeated by the Kyrgyz. The Mongolic Khitans, descendants of the Xianbei, ruled Mongolia during the Liao dynasty (907–1125), after which the Khamag Mongol (1125–1206) rose to prominence.

Lines 3–5 of the memorial inscription of Bilge Khagan (684–737) in central Mongolia summarizes the time of the Khagans:

In battles they subdued the nations of all four sides of the world and suppressed them. They made those who had heads bow their heads, and who had knees genuflect them. In the east up to the Kadyrkhan common people, in the west up to the Iron Gate they conquered... These Khagans were wise. These Khagans were great. Their servants were wise and great too. Officials were honest and direct with people. They ruled the nation this way. This way they held sway over them. When they died ambassadors from Bokuli Cholug (Baekje Korea), Tabgach (Tang China), Tibet (Tibetan Empire), Avar (Avar Khaganate), Rome (Byzantine Empire), Kirgiz, Uch-Kurykan, Otuz-Tatars, Khitans, Tatabis came to the funerals. So many people came to mourn over the great Khagans. They were famous Khagans.

=== Mongol Empire and Yuan dynasty ===
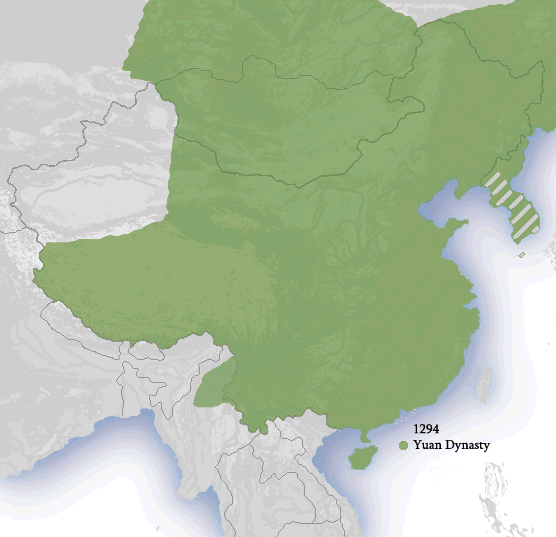
Yuan dynasty, c. 1294

In the chaos of the late 12th century, a chieftain named Temüjin finally succeeded in uniting the Mongol tribes between Manchuria and the Altai Mountains. In 1206, he took the title Genghis Khan and waged a series of military campaigns – renowned for their brutality and ferocity – sweeping through much of Asia and forming the Mongol Empire, the largest contiguous land empire in world history. Under his successors it stretched from present-day Poland in the west to Korea in the east, and from parts of Siberia in the north to the Gulf of Oman and Vietnam in the south, covering some 33,000,000 square kilometers (13,000,000 sq mi), (22% of Earth's land area) and had a population of over 100 million people (about a quarter of Earth's population at the time). The emergence of Pax Mongolica also significantly eased trade and commerce across Asia during its height.

A 1278 portrait of Genghis Khan

After Genghis Khan's death, the empire was subdivided into four khanates. These eventually became quasi-independent after the Toluid Civil War (1260–1264), which broke out in a battle for power following Möngke Khan's death in 1259. One of the khanates, the "Great Khanate", consisting of the Mongol homeland and most of modern-day China, became known as the Yuan dynasty under Kublai Khan, the grandson of Genghis Khan. He set up his capital in present-day Beijing. After more than a century of power, the Yuan dynasty was overthrown by the Ming dynasty in 1368, and the Yuan court fled to the north, thus becoming the Northern Yuan dynasty. As the Ming armies pursued the Mongols into their homeland, they successfully sacked and destroyed the Mongol capital Karakorum and other cities. Some of these attacks were repelled by the Mongols under Ayushridar and his general Köke Temür.

=== Northern Yuan ===
After the expulsion of the Yuan rulers from China proper, the Mongols continued to rule their homeland, known in historiography as the Northern Yuan dynasty. With the division of the Mongol tribes, it was subsequently also known as "The Forty and the Four" (Döčin dörben) among them. The next centuries were marked by violent power struggles among various factions, notably the Genghisids and the non-Genghisid Oirats, as well as by several Ming invasions (such as the five expeditions led by the Yongle Emperor).

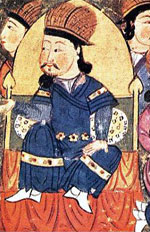
Altan Khan (1507–1582) founded the city of Hohhot, helped introduce Buddhism and originated the title of Dalai Lama.

In the early 16th century, Dayan Khan and his khatun Mandukhai reunited all Mongol groups under the Genghisids. In the mid-16th century, Altan Khan of the Tümed, a grandson of Dayan Khan – but not a hereditary or legitimate khan – became powerful. He founded Hohhot in 1557. After he met with the Dalai Lama in 1578, he ordered the introduction of Tibetan Buddhism to Mongolia. (It was the second time this had occurred.) Abtai Khan of the Khalkha converted to Buddhism and founded the Erdene Zuu Monastery in 1585. His grandson Zanabazar became the first Jebtsundamba Khutughtu in 1640. Following the leaders, the entire Mongolian population embraced Buddhism. Each family kept scriptures and Buddha statues on an altar at the north side of their yurt. Mongolian nobles donated land, money and herders to the monasteries. As was typical in states with established religions, the top religious institutions, the monasteries, wielded significant temporal power in addition to spiritual power.

The last khagan of the Northern Yuan was Ligden Khan in the early 17th century. He came into conflict with the Manchus over the looting of Chinese cities and alienated most Mongol tribes. After his death in 1634, most Inner Mongolian tribes had submitted to the Manchus by 1636, when they founded the Qing dynasty. The Khalkha followed in 1691, bringing most of present-day Mongolia under Manchu rule as the Khalkha, unable to resist the Dzungars, also submitted in the late 17th century. After several Dzungar–Qing Wars, the Dzungars were virtually annihilated during the Qing conquest of Dzungaria in 1755 and 1758.

=== Qing period ===
Outer Mongolia was given relative autonomy, being administered by the hereditary Genghisid khanates of Tüsheet Khan, Sechen Khan, Zasagt Khan and Sain Noyon. The Jebtsundamba Khutuktu had immense de facto authority. The Manchu forbade mass Chinese immigration into the area, which allowed the Mongols to keep their culture. The main trade route during this period was the Tea Road through Siberia; it had permanent stations located every 25 to 30 kilometers (16 to 19 mi), each of which was staffed by 5–30 chosen families.

Until 1911, the Qing dynasty maintained control of Mongolia with a series of alliances and intermarriages, as well as military and economic measures. Ambans (Manchu "high officials") were installed in Khüree, Uliastai, and Khovd, and the country was divided into numerous feudal and ecclesiastical fiefdoms (which also placed people in power with loyalty to the Qing). Over the course of the 19th century, the feudal lords attached more importance to representation and less importance to the responsibilities towards their subjects. The behavior of Mongolia's nobility, together with usurious practices by Chinese traders and the collection of imperial taxes in silver instead of animals, resulted in widespread poverty among the nomads. By 1911 there were 700 monasteries in Outer Mongolia; their 115,000 monks made up 21% of the population. Apart from the Jebtsundamba Khutuktu, there were 13 other reincarnating high lamas, called 'seal-holding saints' (tamgatai khutuktu), in Outer Mongolia.

=== Modern history ===
==== Bogd Khanate ====
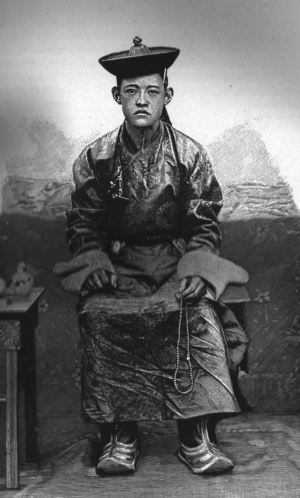
The eighth Jebtsundamba Khutuktu, Bogd Khaan

With the fall of the Qing dynasty in 1911, Mongolia under the Bogd Khaan declared its independence. However, the newly established Republic of China considered Mongolia to be part of its own territory. Yuan Shikai, the president of the Republic of China, considered the republic to be the successor of the Qing. Bogd Khaan said that both Mongolia and China had been administered by the Manchu during the Qing, and after the fall of the Qing dynasty the contract of Mongolian submission to the Manchu had become invalid.

The area controlled by the Bogd Khaan was approximately that of the former Outer Mongolia during the Qing period. In 1919, after the October Revolution in Russia, Chinese troops led by warlord Xu Shuzheng occupied Mongolia. Warfare erupted on the northern border. As a result of the Russian Civil War, the White Russian Lieutenant General Baron Ungern led his troops into Mongolia in October 1920, defeating the Chinese forces in Niislel Khüree (now Ulaanbaatar) in early February 1921 with Mongol support.

To eliminate the threat posed by Ungern, Bolshevik Russia decided to support the establishment of a communist Mongolian government and army. This Mongolian army took the Mongolian part of Kyakhta from Chinese forces on 18 March 1921, and on 6 July Russian and Mongolian troops arrived in Khüree. Mongolia declared its independence again on 11 July 1921. As a result, Mongolia was closely aligned with the Soviet Union over the next seven decades.

==== Mongolian People's Republic ====
In 1924, after the Bogd Khaan died, the country's political system was changed. The Mongolian People's Republic was established. In 1928, Khorloogiin Choibalsan rose to power. The early leaders of the Mongolian People's Republic included many with Pan-Mongolist ideals. However, changing global politics and increased Soviet pressure led to the decline of Pan-Mongol aspirations in the following period.

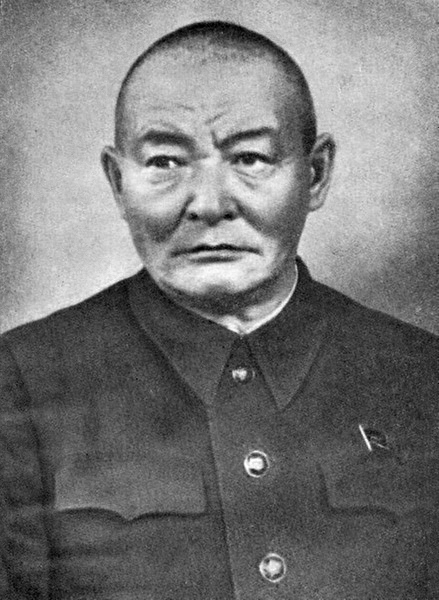
Khorloogiin Choibalsan led Mongolia during the Stalinist era, and presided over an environment of intense political persecution.

Khorloogiin Choibalsan instituted collectivization of livestock, began the destruction of the Buddhist monasteries, and carried out Stalinist purges, which resulted in the murders of numerous monks and other leaders. During the 1920s, approximately one-third of the male population were monks. By the beginning of the 20th century, 750 monasteries were functioning in Mongolia, and by the end of the 1930s almost all had been looted or razed.

In 1930, the Soviet Union stopped Buryat migration to the Mongolian People's Republic to prevent Mongolian reunification. All leaders of Mongolia who did not fulfill Stalin's demands to perform Red Terror against Mongolians were executed, including Peljidiin Genden and Anandyn Amar. The Stalinist purges in Mongolia, which began in 1937, killed more than 30,000 people. Under Stalinist influence, an estimated 17,000 monks were killed. Choibalsan died suspiciously in the Soviet Union in 1952. Comintern leader Bohumír Šmeral said, "People of Mongolia are not important, the land is important. Mongolian land is larger than England, France and Germany".

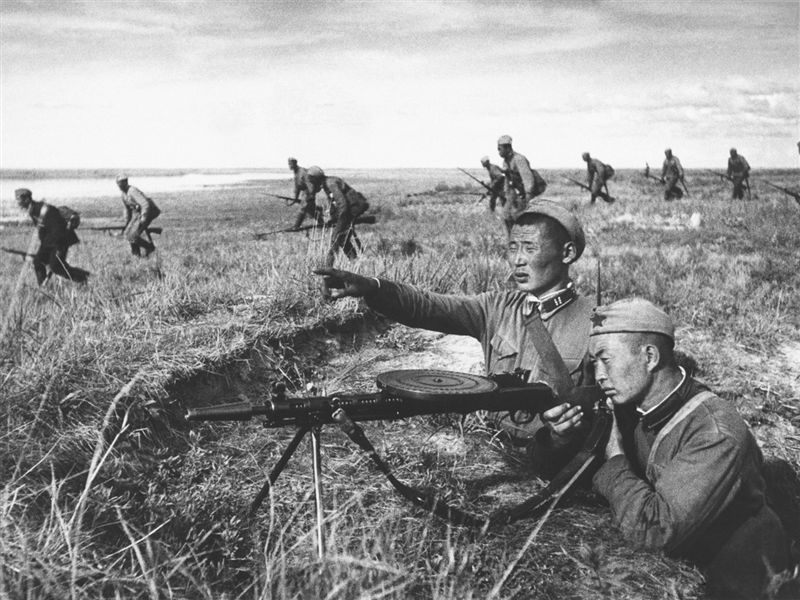
Mongolian troops fight against the Japanese counterattack at Khalkhin Gol, 1939.

After the Japanese invasion of neighboring Manchuria in 1931, Mongolia was threatened on this front. During the Soviet-Japanese Border War of 1939, the Soviet Union successfully defended Mongolia against Japanese expansionism. Mongolia fought against Japan during the Battles of Khalkhin Gol in 1939 and during the Soviet–Japanese War in August 1945 to liberate Inner Mongolia from Japan and Mengjiang.

==== Cold War ====
The February 1945 Yalta Conference provided for the Soviet Union's participation in the Pacific War. One of the Soviet conditions for its participation, put forward at Yalta, was that after the war Outer Mongolia would retain its independence. The referendum took place on 20 October 1945, with (according to official numbers) 100% of the electorate voting for independence.

After the establishment of the People's Republic of China, both countries confirmed their mutual recognition on 6 October 1949. However, the Republic of China (ROC), which still held a seat on the United Nations Security Council despite its defeat in the Chinese Civil War, used its Security Council veto in 1955 to stop the admission of the Mongolian People's Republic to the United Nations on the grounds it recognized all of Mongolia—including Outer Mongolia—as part of China. This was the only time the ROC ever used its veto. Hence, and because of the repeated threats to veto by the ROC, Mongolia did not join the UN until 1961 when the Soviet Union agreed to lift its veto on the admission of Mauritania (and any other newly independent African state), in return for the admission of Mongolia. Faced with pressure from nearly all the other African countries, the ROC relented under protest. Mongolia and Mauritania were both admitted to the UN on 27 October 1961.

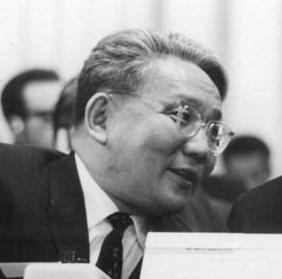
Mongolian Premier Yumjaagiin Tsedenbal was the longest-serving leader in the Eastern Bloc, with over 44 years in office.

On 26 January 1952, Yumjaagiin Tsedenbal took power after the death of Choibalsan. Tsedenbal was the leading political figure for more than 30 years. While Tsedenbal was visiting Moscow in August 1984, his severe illness prompted the parliament to announce his retirement and replaced him with Jambyn Batmönkh.

==== Post-Cold War ====
The dissolution of the Soviet Union in 1991 strongly influenced Mongolian politics and youth. Its people undertook the peaceful Democratic Revolution in January 1990 and the introduction of a multi-party system and a market economy. At the same time, the transformation of the former Marxist-Leninist Mongolian People's Revolutionary Party to the current social democratic Mongolian People's Party reshaped the country's political landscape.

A new constitution was introduced in 1992, and the term "People's Republic" was dropped from the name. The transition to a market economy was often rocky; during the early 1990s the country had to deal with high inflation and food shortages. The first election victories for non-communist parties came in 1993 (presidential elections) and 1996 (parliamentary elections). China has supported Mongolia's application for membership in the Asia Cooperation Dialogue, Asia-Pacific Economic Cooperation and granting it observer status in the Shanghai Cooperation Organisation.

== Geography ==
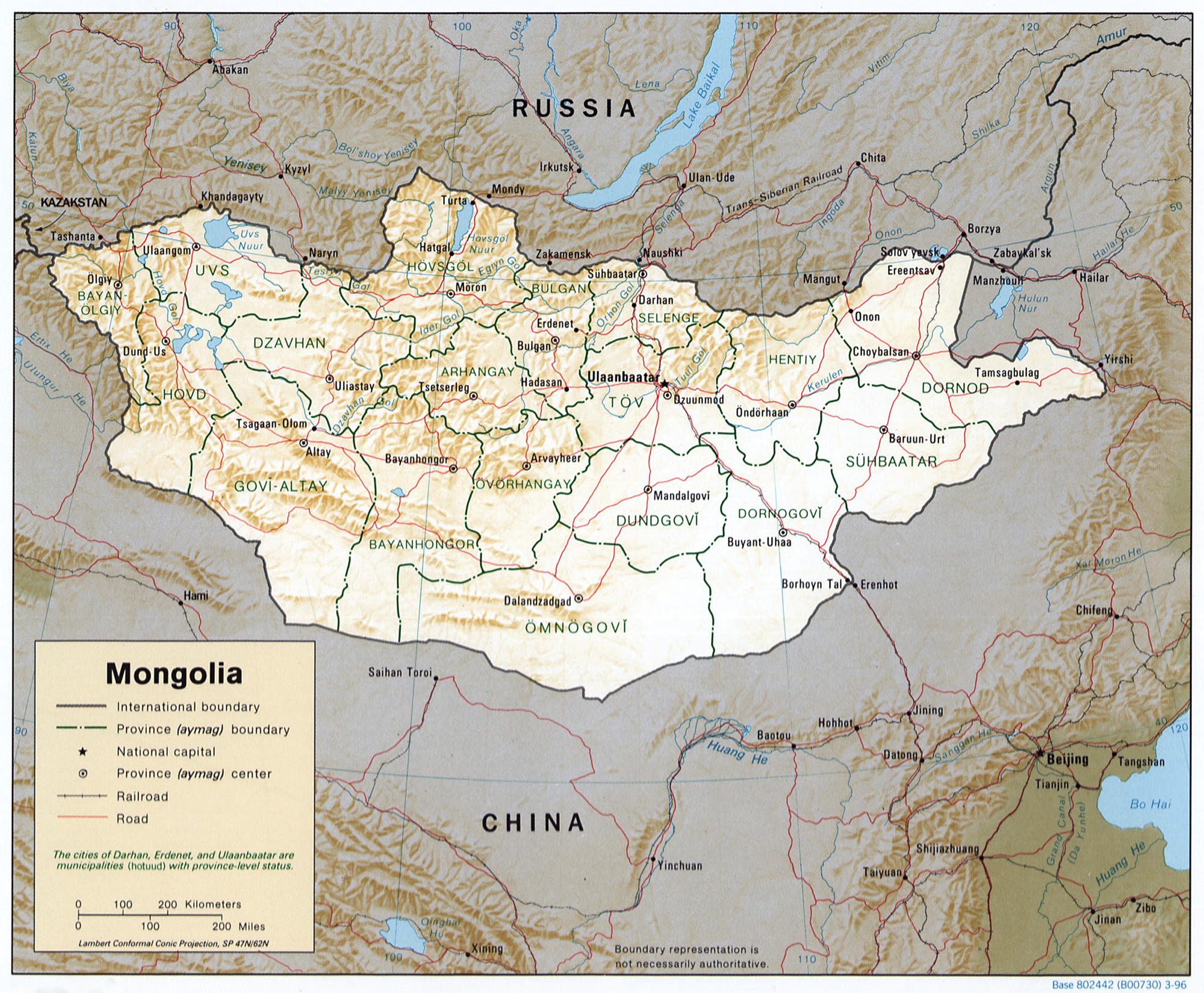
The southern portion of Mongolia consists of the Gobi Desert, while the northern and western portions are mountainous.

At 1,564,116 km^{2} (603,909 mi^{2}), Mongolia is the world's 18th-largest country. It mostly lies between latitudes 41° and 52°N (a small area is north of 52°), and longitudes 87° and 120°E. The geography is varied, with the Gobi Desert to the south and cold, mountainous regions to the north and west. Much of the land consists of the Mongolian–Manchurian grassland, with forested areas accounting for 11.2% of the total land area. The whole of Mongolia is considered to be part of the Mongolian Plateau. The highest point is Khüiten Peak in the Tavan Bogd massif in the far west at 4,374 m (14,350 ft). The Uvs Lake Basin, shared with Tuva Republic in Russia, is a natural World Heritage Site.

=== Climate ===
Köppen climate classification zones in Mongolia

Mongolia is high, cold and windy. It has an extreme continental climate with long, cold winters and short summers, during which most of its annual precipitation falls. Most of the country is hot in the summer and extremely cold in the winter, with January averages dropping as low as −30 °C (−22 °F). In winter the region comes under the influence of the Siberian Anticyclone. A vast front of cold, heavy, shallow air comes in from Siberia in winter and collects in river valleys and low basins, causing very cold temperatures, while slopes of mountains are much warmer due to the effects of temperature inversion (temperature increases with altitude). The annual average temperature in Ulaanbaatar is −1.3 °C (29.7 °F), making it the world's coldest capital city. The country is subject to occasional harsh climatic conditions known as zud, in which large proportions of livestock die from starvation or freezing temperatures or both, resulting in economic upheaval for the largely pastoral population. A unique microclimate is the fertile grassland-forest region of central and eastern Arkhangai Province and northern Ovorkhangai Province where January temperatures are on average the same and often higher than the warmest desert regions to the south in addition to being more stable. The Khangai Mountains play a role in forming this microclimate. In Tsetserleg, the warmest town in this microclimate, nighttime January temperatures rarely go under −30 °C (−22 °F) while daytime January temperatures often reach 0 °C (32 °F) to 5 °C (41 °F).

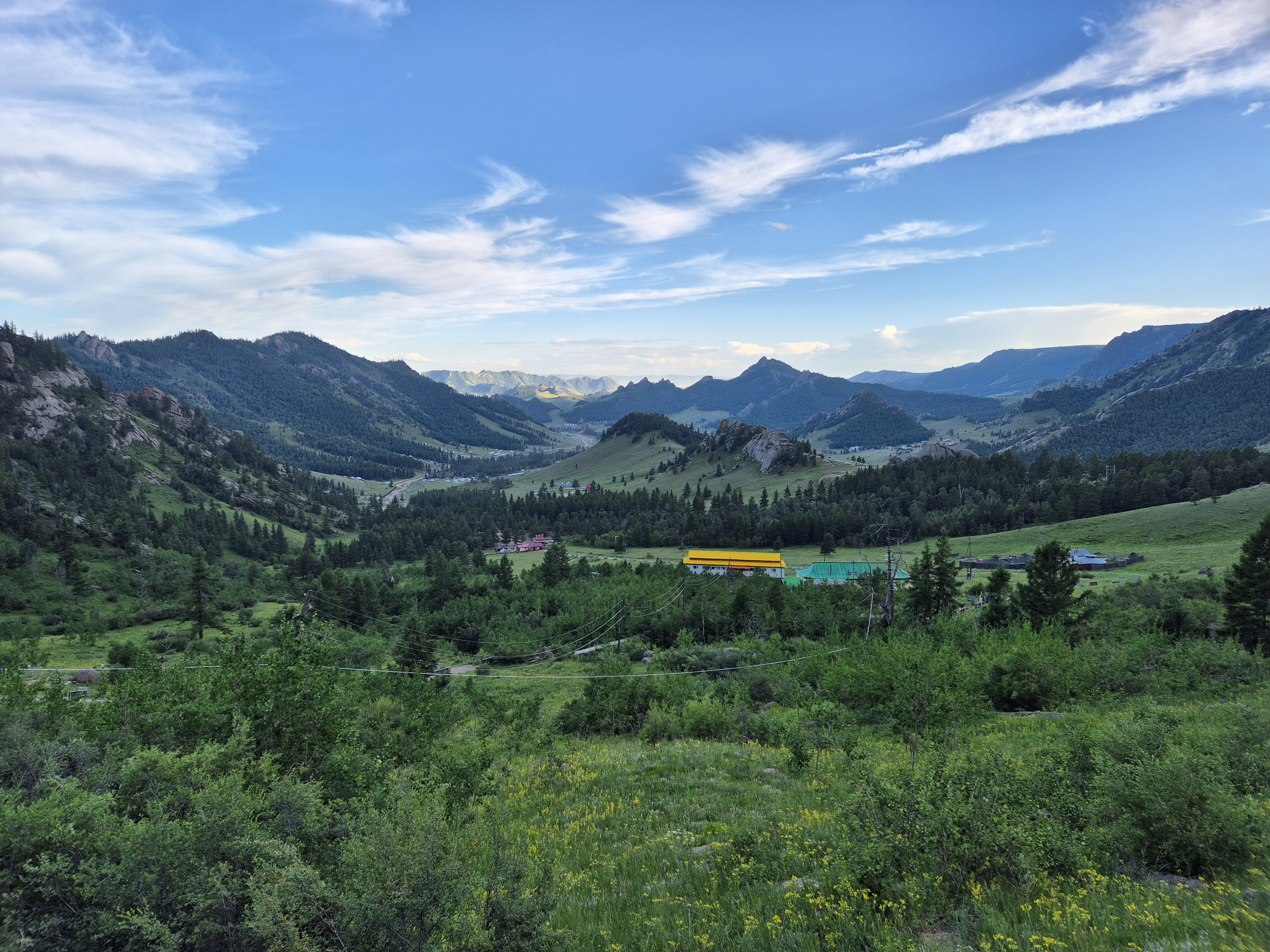
The Khentii Mountains in Terelj, close to the birthplace of Genghis Khan

Mongolia is known as the "Land of the Eternal Blue Sky" or "Country of Blue Sky" (Mongolian: "Mönkh khökh tengeriin oron") because it has over 250 sunny days per year. Precipitation is highest in the north (average of 200 to 350 millimeters (8 to 14 in) per year) and lowest in the south, which receives 100 to 200 millimeters (4 to 8 in) annually. The sparsely populated far north of Bulgan Province averages 600 mm (24 in) in annual precipitation. The highest annual precipitation of 622 mm (24.5 in) occurred in the forests of Bulgan Province, and the lowest of 42 mm (1.7 in) occurred in the Gobi Desert.

=== Environmental issues ===
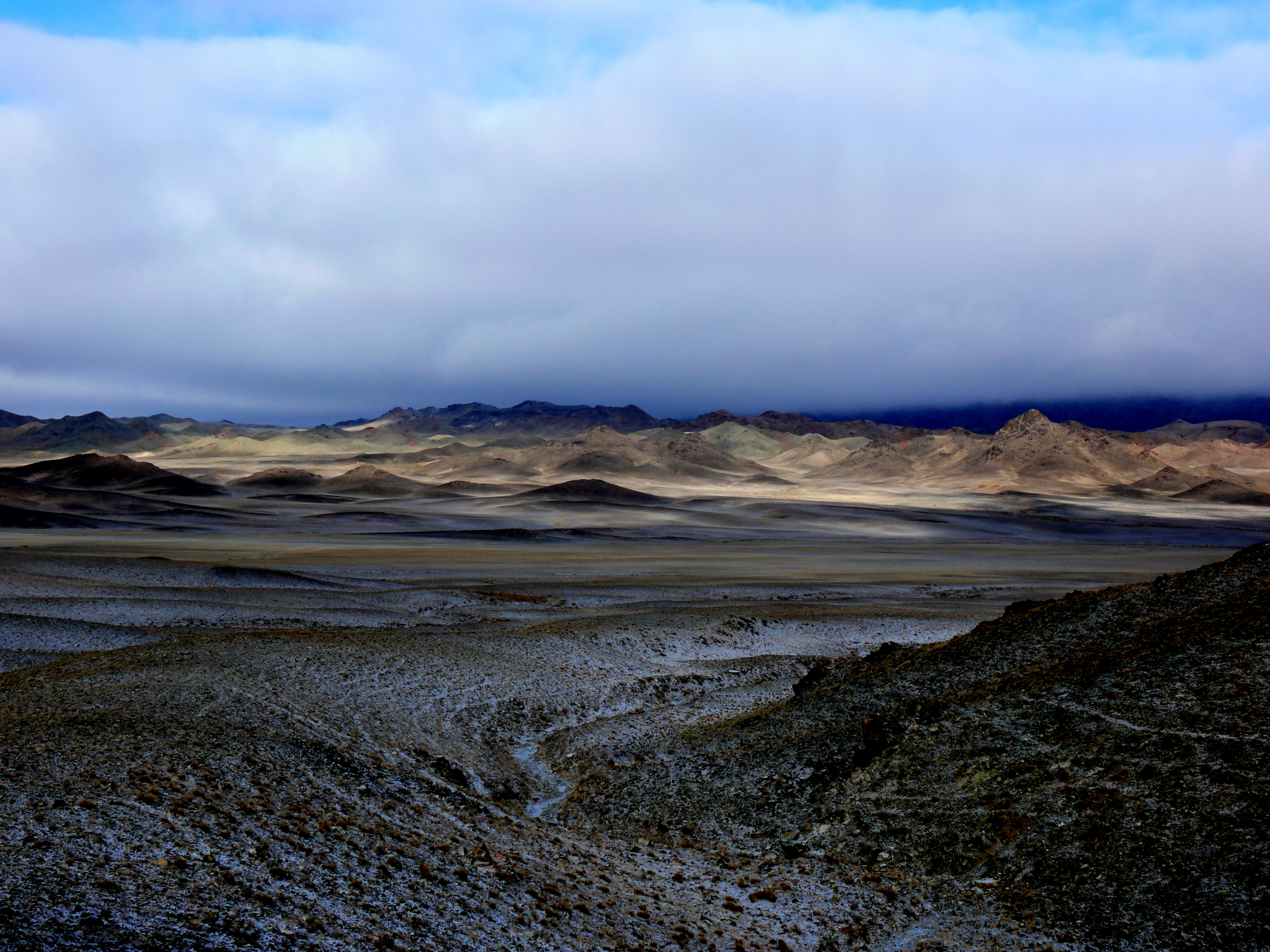
The Gobi Desert, Ömnögovi Province. Desertification is a key issue in Mongolia.

There are many pressing environmental issues in Mongolia that are detrimental to both human and environmental wellness. These problems have arisen in part due to natural factors, but increasingly because of human actions. One of these issues is climate change, which will be responsible for an increase in desertification, natural disasters, and land degradation. Another is deforestation, which is expanding due to human activity, pests, disease, and fires. Mongolian lands are becoming more arid through desertification, a process that is being exacerbated due to irresponsible land use. Additionally, more and more species are disappearing and at risk for extinction. Moreover, especially in population centers, Mongolians deal with air and water pollution caused by industrialization.

=== Wildlife ===
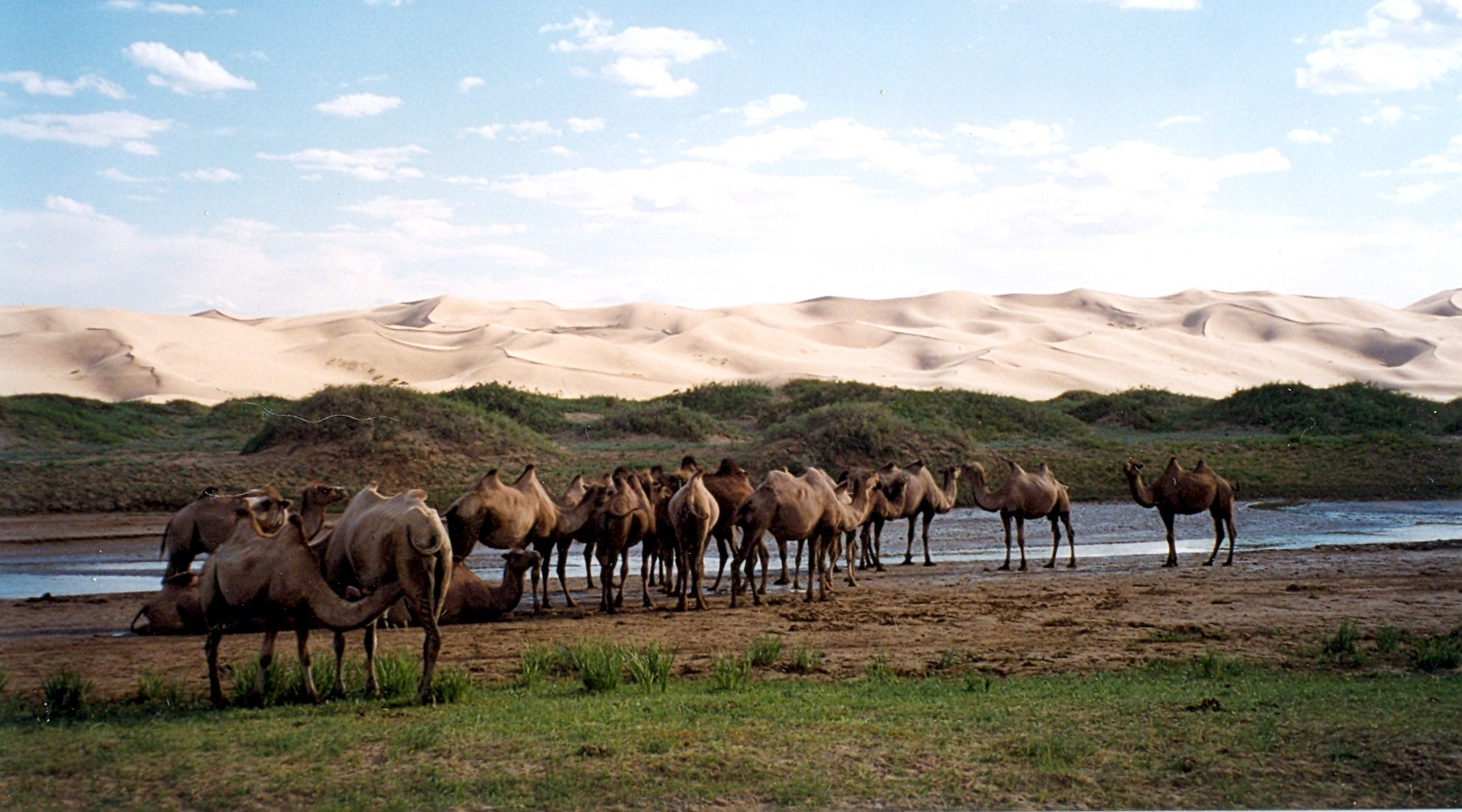
Bactrian camels by sand dunes in Gobi Desert

The name "Gobi" is a Mongol term for a desert steppe, which usually refers to a category of arid rangeland with insufficient vegetation to support marmots but with enough to support camels. Mongols distinguish Gobi from desert proper, although the distinction is not always apparent to outsiders unfamiliar with the Mongolian landscape.

Gobi rangelands are fragile and easily destroyed by overgrazing, which results in expansion of the true desert, a stony waste where not even Bactrian camels can survive. The arid conditions in the Gobi are attributed to the rain shadow effect caused by the Himalayas. Before the Himalayas were formed by the collision of the Indo-Australian plate with the Eurasian plate 10 million years ago, Mongolia was a flourishing habitat for major fauna but still somewhat arid and cold due to distance from sources of evaporation. Sea turtle and mollusk fossils have been found in the Gobi, apart from well-known dinosaur fossils. Tadpole shrimps are still found in the Gobi today. The eastern part of Mongolia including the Onon and Kherlen rivers and Lake Buir form part of the Amur river basin draining to the Pacific Ocean. It hosts some unique species like the Eastern brook lamprey, Daurian crayfish (cambaroides dauricus) and Daurian pearl oyster (dahurinaia dahurica) in the Onon/Kherlen rivers as well as Siberian prawn (exopalaemon modestus) in Lake Buir. Many large mammals inhabit the nation including saiga, argali, Siberian ibex, elk, Altai wapiti, reindeer, wild boar, onager, wild horse, snow leopard, Mongolian wolf, and brown bear. A few large mammals have also been extirpated from the nation including Ussuri dhole, tiger, and European bison.

== Government and politics ==
Sandagiin Byambatsogt
President (acting)

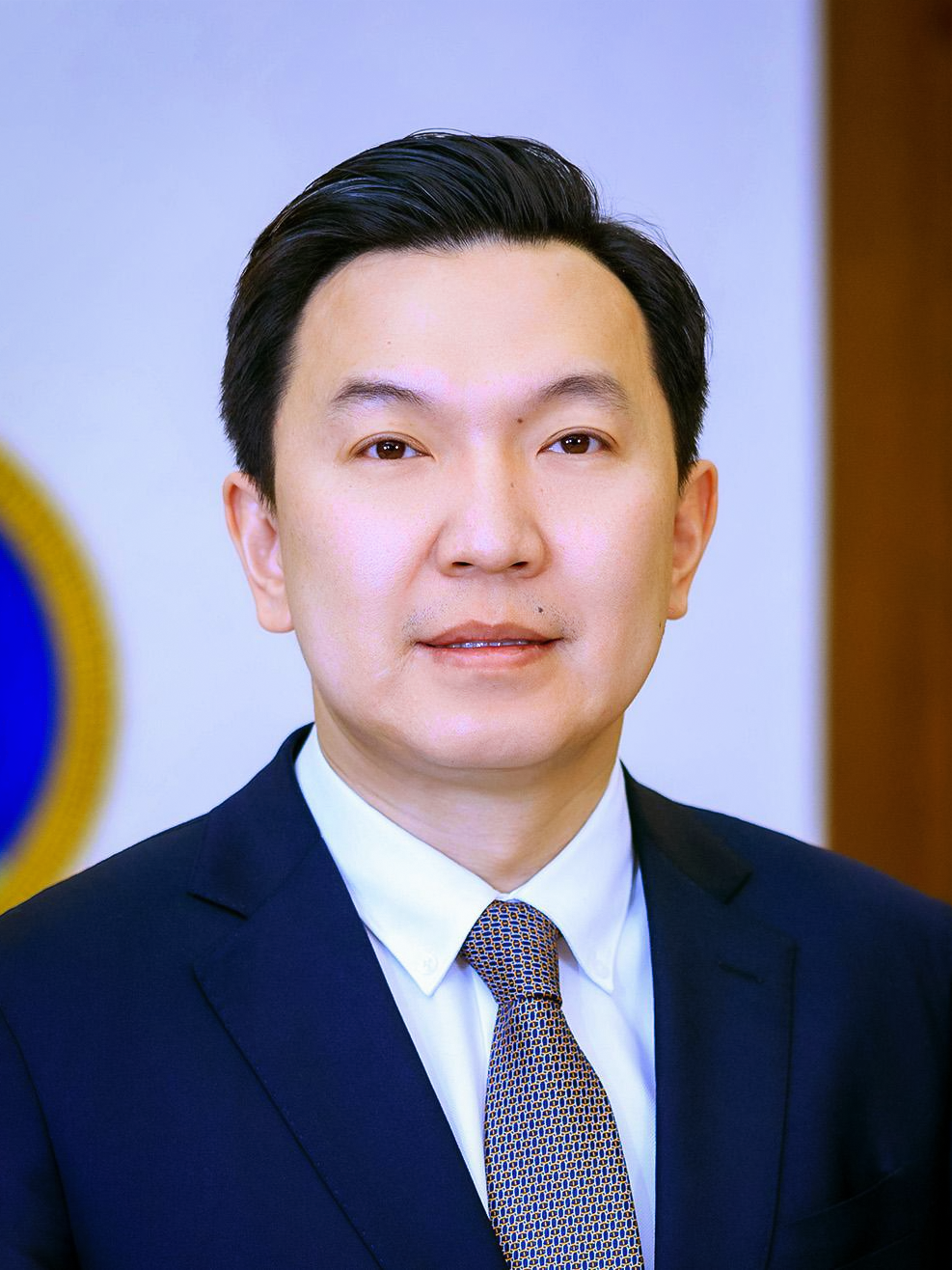
Nyam-Osoryn Uchral
Prime Minister

Mongolia is a semi-presidential representative democratic republic with a directly-elected president. The people also elect the deputies in the unicameral legislature, the State Great Khural. The president appoints the prime minister and nominates the cabinet on the proposal of the prime minister. The prime minister is the head of the executive branch.

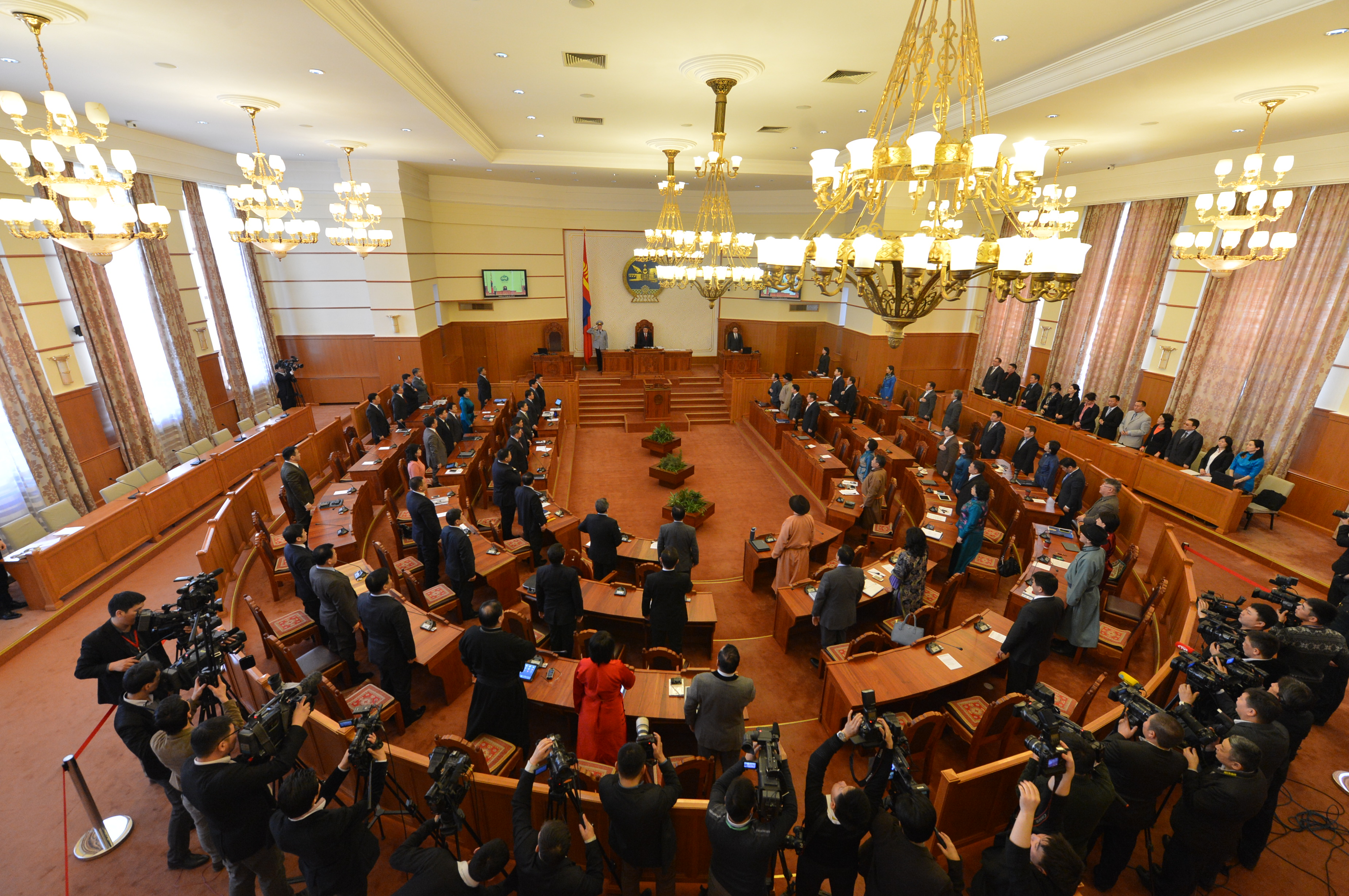
State Great Khural during the opening of the spring session in March 2014

The State Great Khural, with 126 seats, is chaired by the chairman of the State Great Khural. Its members are directly elected, every four years, by popular vote. According to V-Dem Democracy Indices, Mongolia was autocratizing in 2024.

The president is able to veto the laws made by parliament, appoint judges and court justices, and appoint ambassadors. The parliament can override that veto by a two-thirds majority vote. The constitution provides three requirements for taking office as president: the candidate must be a native-born Mongolian, be at least 45 years old, and have resided in Mongolia for five years before taking office. The president must also suspend their party membership. In June 2021, former Prime Minister Ukhnaagiin Khürelsükh, the candidate of the ruling Mongolian People's Party, became the country's sixth democratically elected president after winning the presidential election.

The Mongolian People's Party (left) and the Democratic Party (right) has dominated Mongolia's political scene for much of its modern history.

The largest political parties are the Mongolian People's Party (MPP) and the Democratic Party. The non-governmental organization Freedom House considers Mongolia to be free. The Mongolian People's Party – known as the Mongolian People's Revolutionary Party (MPRP) between 1924 and 2010 – governed the country from 1921 to 1996 (in a one-party system until 1990). The party was out of power for the first time in the 1996 parliamentary elections, when the opposition Democratic Union Coalition held the majority for four years. However, after many political crises and unpopularity, the coalition lost much of its seats to the MPRP in the 2000 election. Subsequently, the Democratic Party was founded in 2000 through the merger of five parties and became the primary opposition to the MPRP up until the 2004 elections, when it became an almost-equal coalition partner to the MPRP. The Democratic Party became the dominant political force between 2012 to 2016, when it held the presidency, prime ministership, and speakership. The MPP won a landslide victory in the 2016 election and again in the 2020 election. Electoral reforms in 2023 allowed minor parties to be more represented in parliament via proportional representation. Consequently, the MPP's supermajority was reduced to a slim majority in the 2024 elections, allowing the Democratic Party and three other parties to make up almost half of the expanded State Great Khural. Since 2024, there have been three prime ministers and three different coalition governments led by the MPP. The current prime minister is Nyam-Osoryn Uchral, who has served since March 2026.

=== Administrative divisions ===
Clickable map of Mongolian provinces

Mongolia is divided into 21 provinces (aimags) and subdivided into 330 districts (sums). Ulaanbaatar is administered separately as a capital city (municipality) with provincial status. The aimags are:

- Arkhangai
- Bayan-Ölgii
- Bayankhongor
- Bulgan
- Darkhan-Uul
- Dornod
- Dornogovi
- Dundgovi
- Govi-Altai
- Govisümber
- Khentii
- Khovd
- Khövsgöl
- Ömnögovi
- Orkhon
- Övörkhangai
- Selenge
- Sükhbaatar
- Töv
- Uvs
- Zavkhan

=== Foreign relations ===
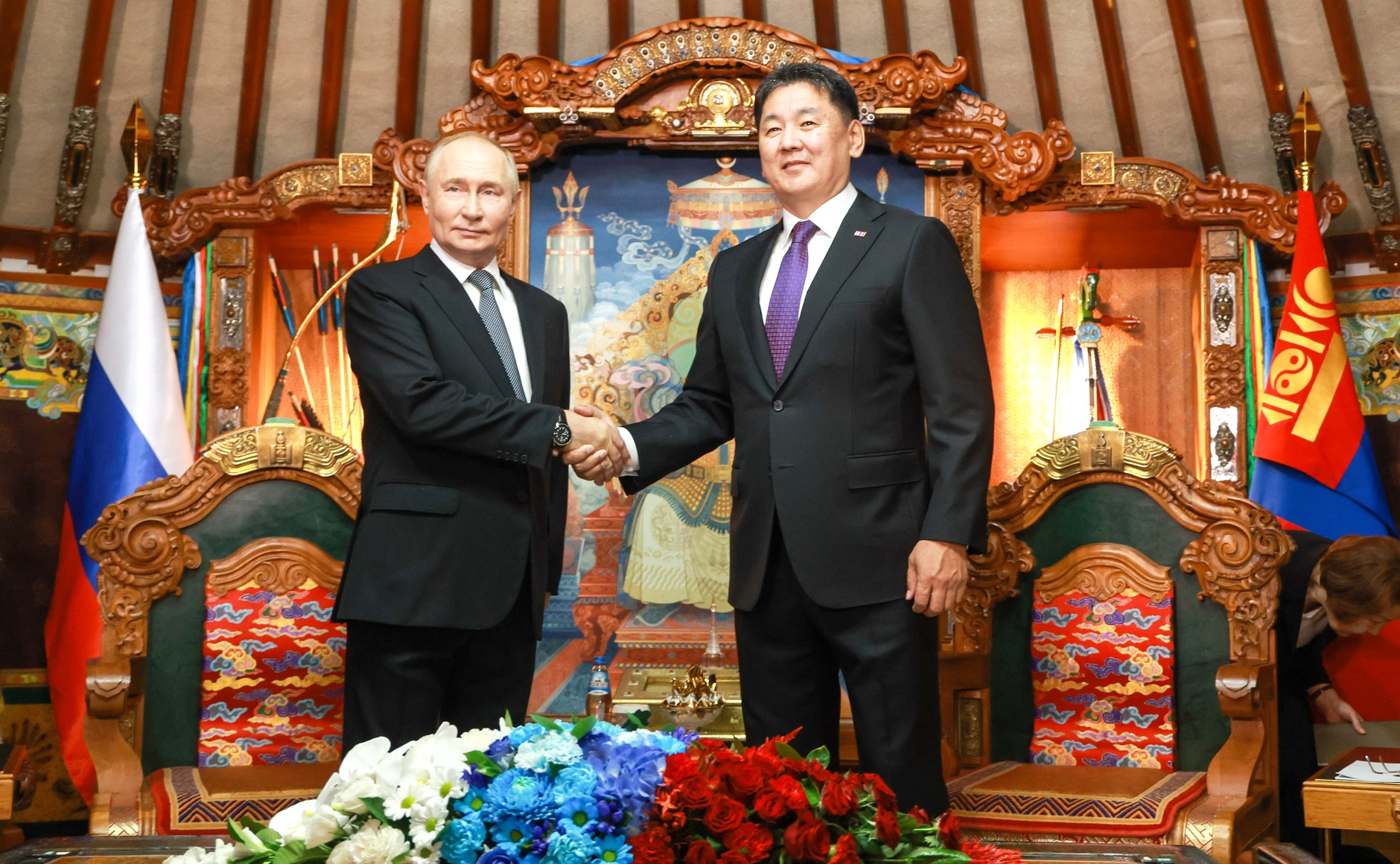
Mongolian President Ukhnaagiin Khürelsükh with Russian President Vladimir Putin in Ulaanbaatar, Mongolia, 3 September 2024

Mongolia maintains many diplomatic missions and embassies in other countries. Foreign relations traditionally focus on its two large neighbors, Russia and China. Mongolia is economically dependent on these countries: China is its largest export partner at a 78% share, far above the other top countries (Switzerland at 15%; Singapore 3%). Mongolia receives 36% of imports from China and 29% from Russia. Mongolia is pursuing a trilateral partnership with China and Russia through the Power of Siberia 2 natural gas pipeline, with a contract to be signed in the "near future" according to Russian Deputy Prime Minister Alexander Novak. Due to China's status as Mongolia's most important trading partner, Mongolia has been trying to stay out of the current US-China confrontation.

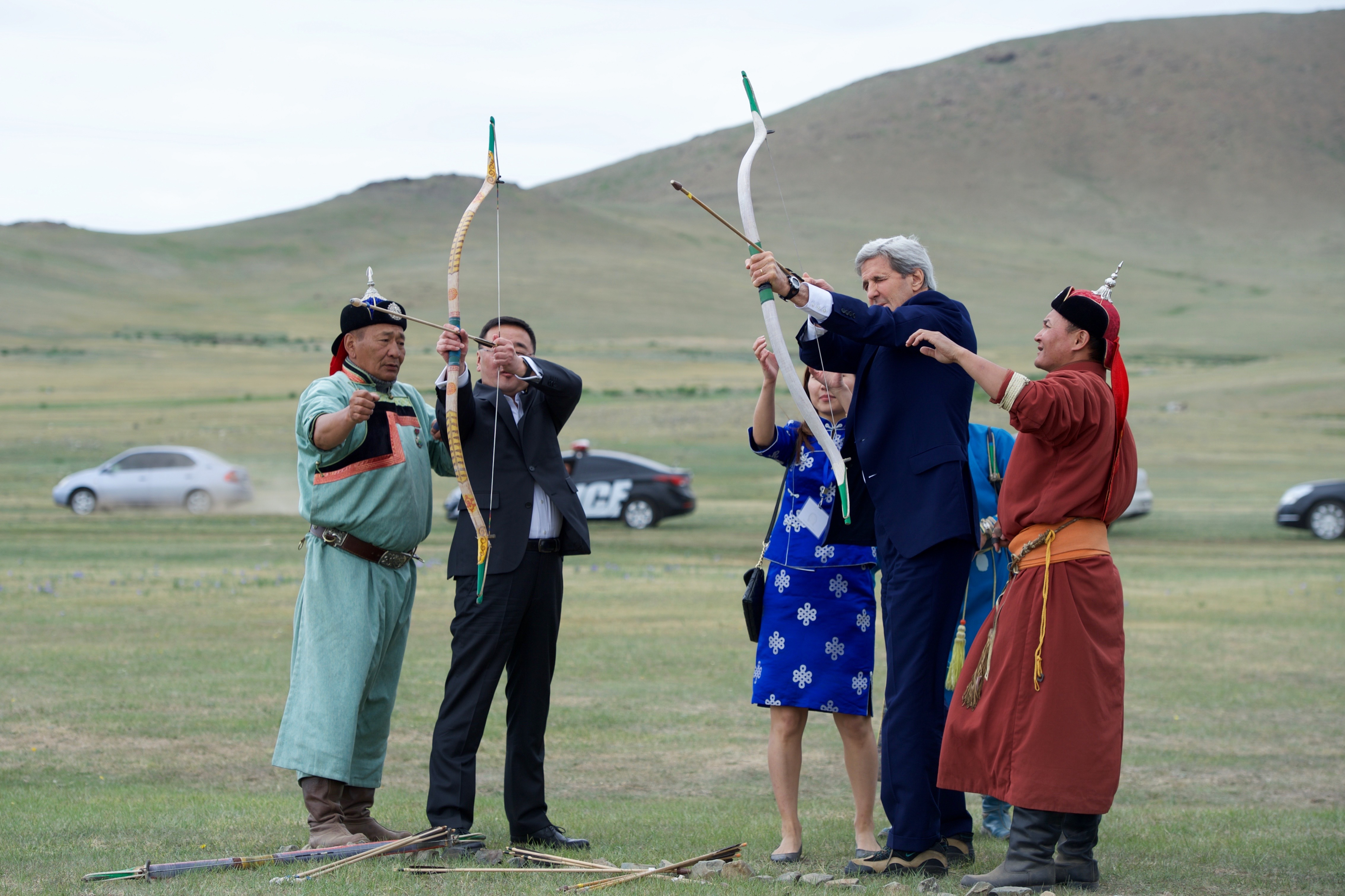
Mongolian President Tsakhiagiin Elbegdorj with US Secretary of State John Kerry, June 2016

Mongolia has been a member of the Forum of Small States since its founding in 1992. It has begun seeking positive relations with a wider range of other countries especially in cultural and economic matters, focusing on encouraging foreign direct investment and trade. Mongolia has been pursuing a third neighbor policy since early 1990s to build deeper relations and partnerships with countries beyond its two surrounding neighbors. US Vice President Joe Biden visited Mongolia in 2011, supporting third neighbor policy.

Mongolia supported the 2003 invasion of Iraq and has sent several successive contingents of 103 to 180 Mongolian troops each to Iraq. About 130 troops were deployed to Afghanistan. 200 Mongolian troops served in Sierra Leone on a UN mandate to protect the UN's special court set up there, and in July 2009, Mongolia sent a battalion to Chad in support of MINURCAT.

From 2005 to 2006, about 40 troops were deployed with the Belgian and Luxembourg contingents in Kosovo. On 21 November 2005, George W. Bush became the first-ever sitting US president to visit Mongolia. In 2004, under Bulgarian chairmanship, the Organization for Security and Co-operation in Europe invited Mongolia as its newest Asian partner.

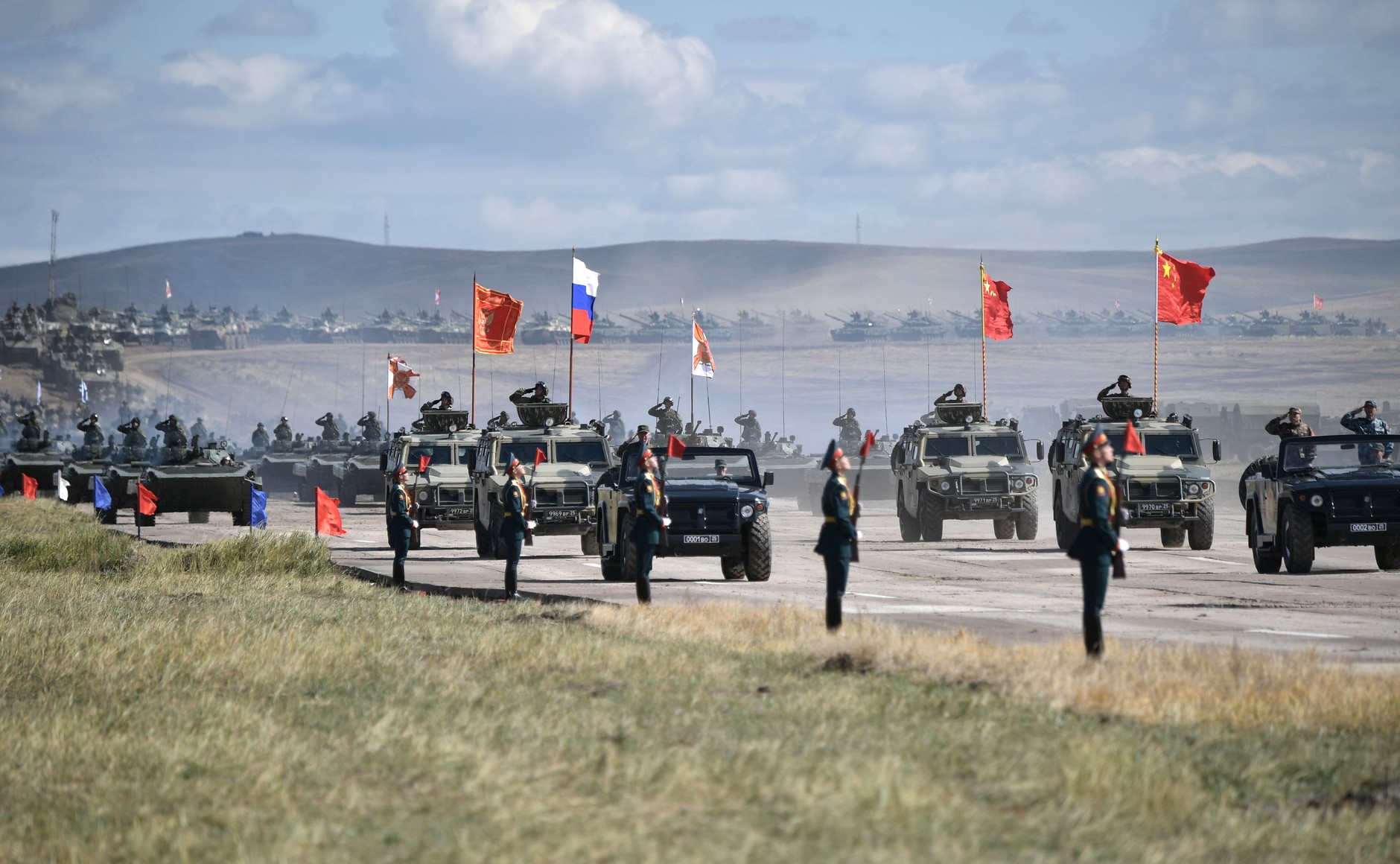
Mongolian, Chinese and Russian national flags set on armored vehicles during the large-scale military exercise Vostok 2018 in Eastern Siberia

=== Legal system ===
The judiciary of Mongolia is made up of a three-tiered court system: first instance courts in each provincial district and each Ulaanbaatar district; appellate courts for each province and also the Capital Ulaanbaatar; and the court of last resort (for non-constitutional matters) at the Supreme Court of Mongolia. For questions of constitutional law, there is a separate constitutional court. Arbitration centers provide alternative dispute resolution options for commercial and other disputes.

A Judicial General Council nominates judges, who must then be confirmed by the parliament and appointed by the president.

== Economy ==
Historical development of real GDP per capita in Mongolia

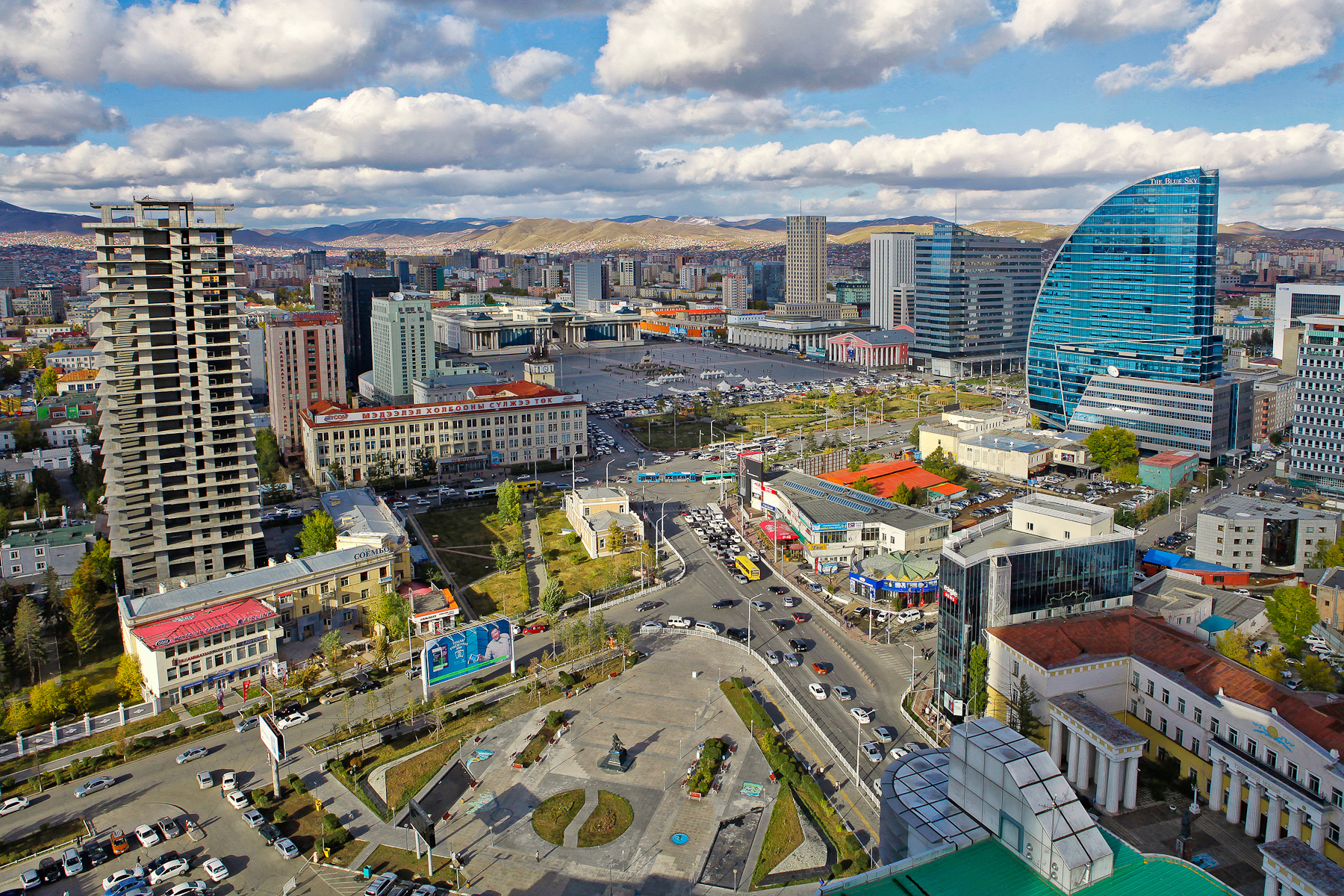
View of Ulaanbaatar with the Blue Sky Tower

Economic activity in Mongolia has long been based on herding and agriculture, although development of extensive mineral deposits of copper, coal, molybdenum, tin, tungsten and gold have emerged as a driver of industrial production. Besides mining (21.8% of GDP) and agriculture (16% of GDP), dominant industries in the composition of GDP are wholesale and retail trade and service, transportation and storage, and real estate activities. Also, Mongolia produces one-fifth of the world's raw cashmere. The informal economy is estimated to be at least one-third the size of the official economy. As of 2022, 78% of exports went to the PRC, and the PRC supplied 36% of Mongolia's imports.

According to the Asian Development Bank, 27.1% of the population lived below the national poverty line in 2022, and GDP per capita was estimated at $12,100. Real GDP grew by 7% in 2023 as a result of record-high coal production, driven by strong demand from China. Despite a robust increase in import volumes, Mongolia recorded a current account surplus from the sharp increase in coal exports. Lower global food and fuel prices resulted in a 7% drop in inflation in early 2024. Mining sector growth is expected to continue driving GDP growth, although the International Monetary Fund predicts the current account balance will revert to a sizable deficit because of declining coal prices.

The World Bank has stated that expansion of mining and large public investment provide a positive outlook for development prospects, although challenges remain from inflation, weaker external demand from China, and persistent fiscal risks due to sizable contingent liabilities. In 2011, Citigroup analysts determined Mongolia to be one of the "global growth generating" countries, which are countries with the most promising growth prospects for 2010–2050. The Mongolian Stock Exchange, established in 1991 in Ulaanbaatar, is among the world's smallest stock exchanges by market capitalization. As of 2024, it has 180 companies listed with a total market capitalization of US$3.2 billion. The International Finance Corporation currently ranks Mongolia as 81st globally in its ease of doing business scoring. Mongolia was ranked 78th in the Global Innovation Index in 2025.

=== Mineral industry ===
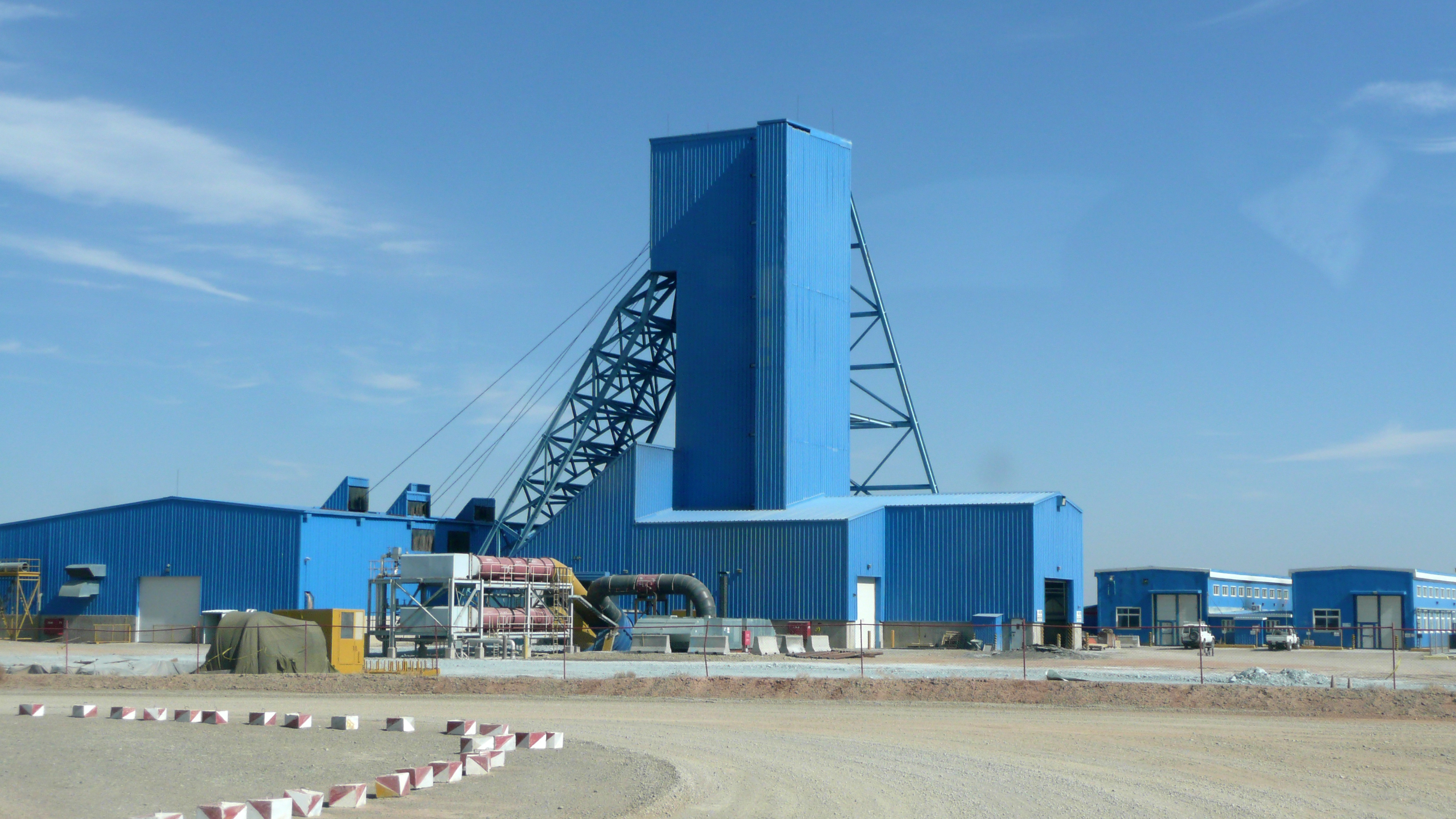
Oyu Tolgoi employs 21,000 workers and produced 168,000 tons of copper in 2023.

Minerals represent more than 80% of Mongolia's exports, a proportion expected to rise to 95%. Fiscal revenues from mining represented 21% of government income in 2010 and rose to 24% in 2018. About 3,000 mining licenses have been issued. Mining continues to rise as a major industry as evidenced by the number of Chinese, Russian and Canadian firms starting mining businesses.

In 2009 the government negotiated an agreement with Rio Tinto and Ivanhoe Mines to develop the Oyu Tolgoi copper and gold deposit, the largest foreign investment project in Mongolia at the time. The mine is a major producer of copper and gold, with plans to further develop underground production and reach an output of 500,000 tons of copper per year. Gold production in 2015 was 15 metric tons. Lawmakers have attempted to finance the development of the Tavan Tolgoi area, the world's largest untapped coal deposit with more than six billion tonnes of coal reserves. However, proposed international partnerships failed in 2011 and 2015, with Mongolia further canceling an international initial public offering in 2020, citing financial and political difficulties. In September 2022, Mongolia built and launched a 233-km direct rail link to China, which is a milestone in Mongolia's plan to become China's leading supplier of coal from Tavan Tolgoi.

=== Agriculture ===
Herder managing their livestocks; animal husbandry make up the majority of agriculture in Mongolia.

Agriculture in Mongolia constitutes over 10% of Mongolia's annual gross domestic product and employs one-third of the labor force. However, the high altitude, extreme fluctuation in temperature, long winters, and low precipitation provides limited potential for agricultural development. The growing season is only 95 – 110 days. Because of Mongolia's harsh climate, it is unsuited to most cultivation.

The agriculture sector therefore remains heavily focused on nomadic animal husbandry with 75% of the land allocated to pasture, and cropping only employing 3% of the population. About 35% of all households in Mongolia lived from breeding livestock. Most herders in Mongolia follow a pattern of nomadic or semi-nomadic pastoralism.

Crops produced in Mongolia include wheat, barley, and potatoes. Animals raised commercially in the country include sheep, goats, cattles, horses, camels, and pigs. They are raised primarily for their meat, although goats are valued for their hair which can be used to produce cashmere. Livestock breeds are increasingly challenged by land degradation and climate change. Populations suffer from more frequent and intense extreme weather events, especially brutal winter seasons called zuds that destroy forage and can decrease temperatures to around −50 °C. While zuds used to occur about once every ten years, there have now been six in the past decade, with over six million animals (9% of total livestock) killed by these conditions in the winter of 2024.

=== Communications ===
Telecommunications in Mongolia face unique challenges. As the least densely populated country in the world, with a significant portion of the population living a nomadic lifestyle, it has been difficult for many traditional information and communication technology (ICT) companies to make headway into Mongolian society. With almost half the population clustered in the capital of Ulaanbaatar, most landline technologies are deployed there. Wireless technologies have had greater success in rural areas.

Mobile phones are common, with provincial capitals all having 4G access. Wireless local loop is another technology that has helped Mongolia increase accessibility to telecommunications and bypass fixed-line infrastructure. For Internet, Mongolia relies on fiber optic communications with its Chinese and Russian neighbors. In 2005, Mongolia's state-run radio and TV provider converted to a public service provider. Private radio and TV broadcasters, multi-channel satellite, and cable TV providers are also available.

Postal services are provided by state-owned Mongol Post and 54 other licensed operators.

=== Energy ===
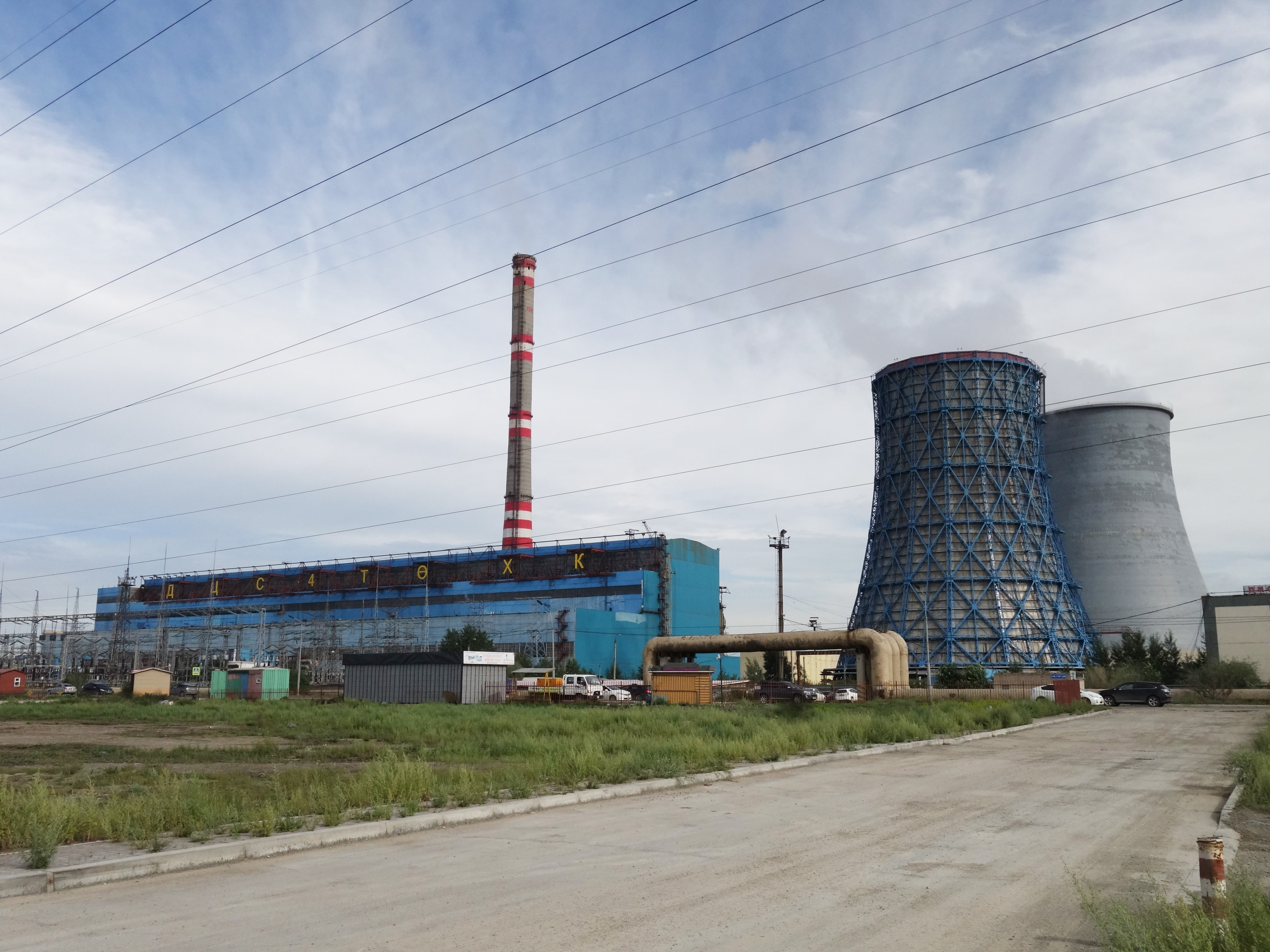
Thermal Power Plant No. 4 in Ulaanbaaatar is Mongolia's largest power station.

Mongolia had a total primary energy supply (TPES) of 6.66 Mtoe in 2019. Electricity consumption was 7.71 TWh. Mongolia is a big producer of coal, which is mostly exported. Domestic consumption of coal accounts for about 70% of Mongolia's primary energy and makes up most of the electricity generation, accounting for about 87% of the domestic electricity production in 2019.

Mongolia imports 98% of its fuel and is building its first ever oil refinery to reduce its foreign energy dependency.

=== Transportation ===
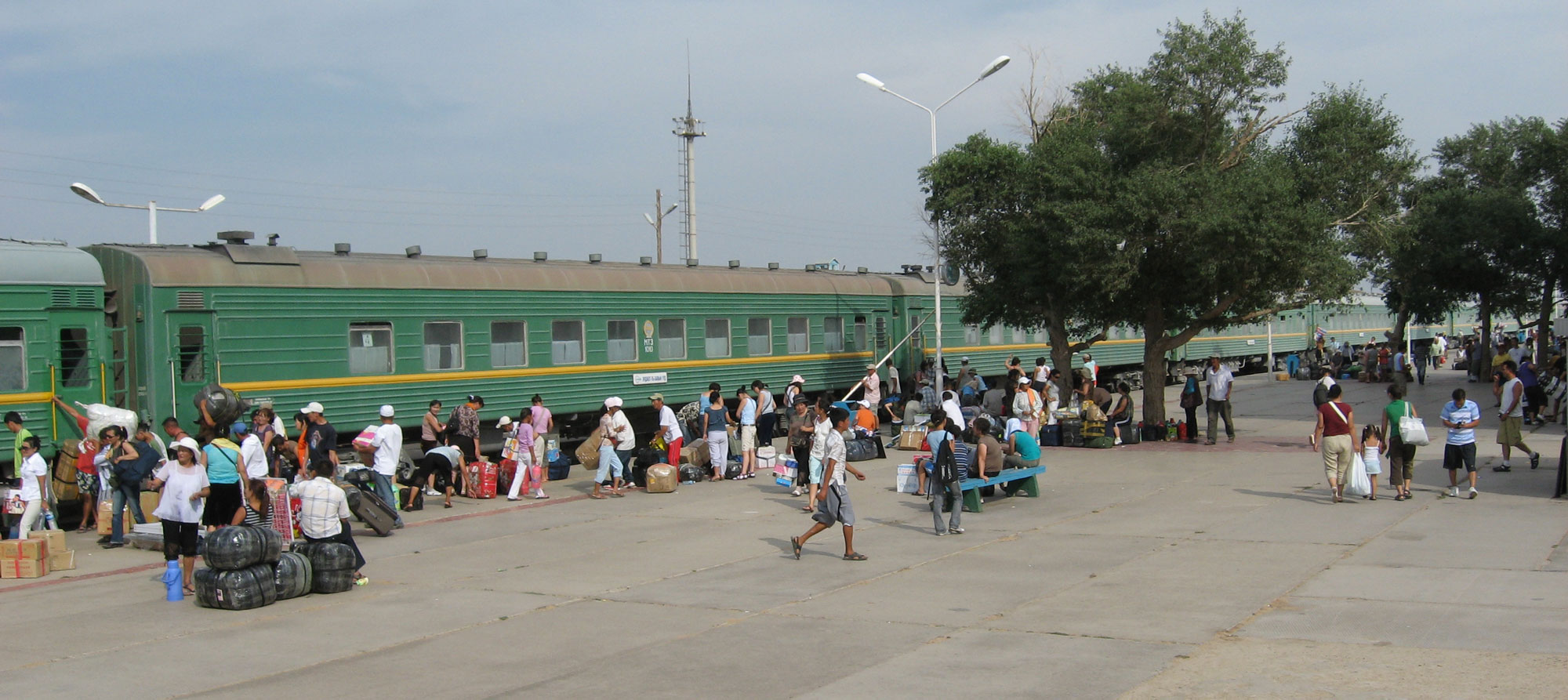
Train in Zamyn-Üüd station in Dornogovi Province

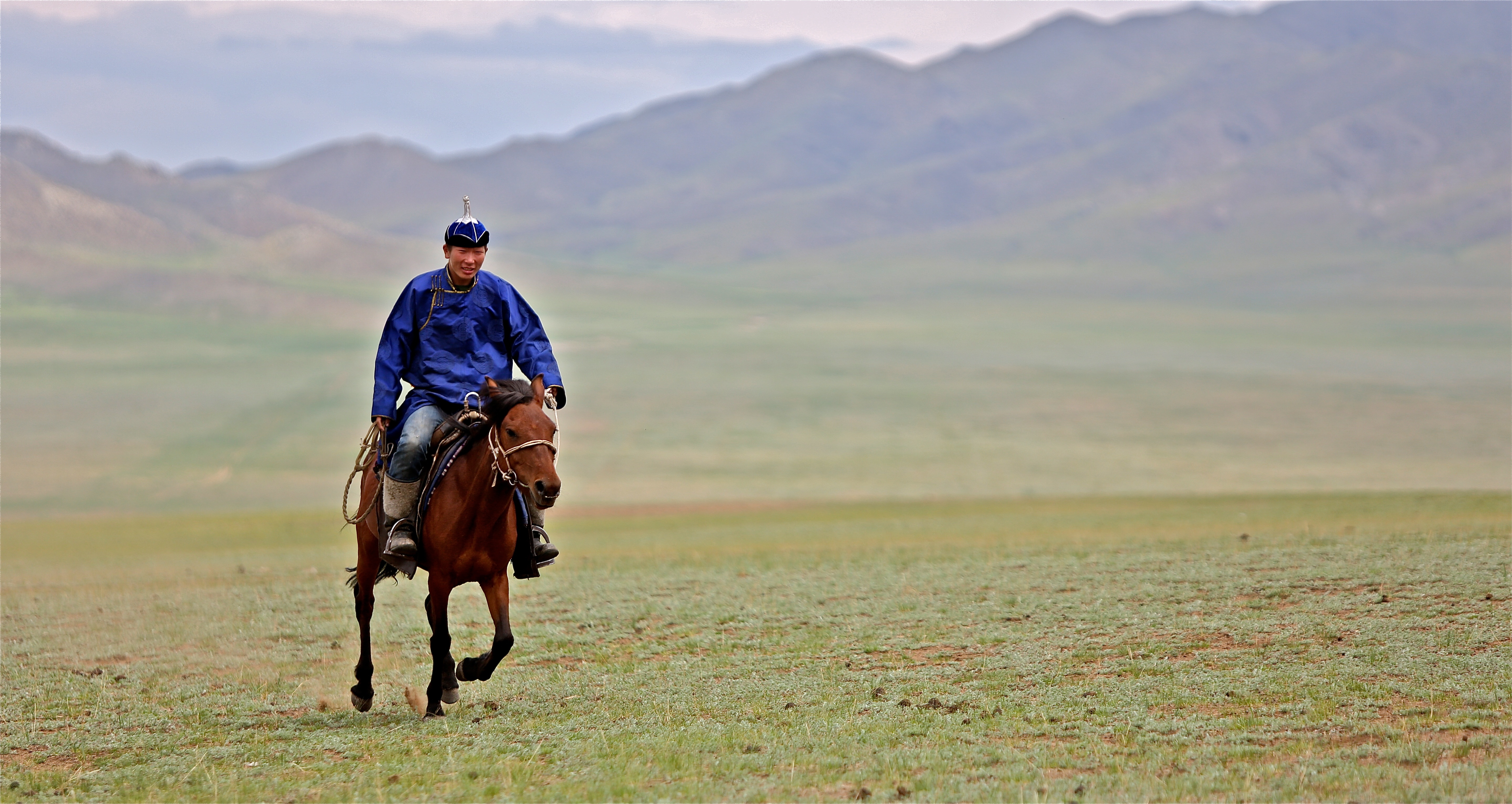
While the Mongolian horse continues to be revered as the national symbol, they are rapidly being replaced by motorized vehicles.

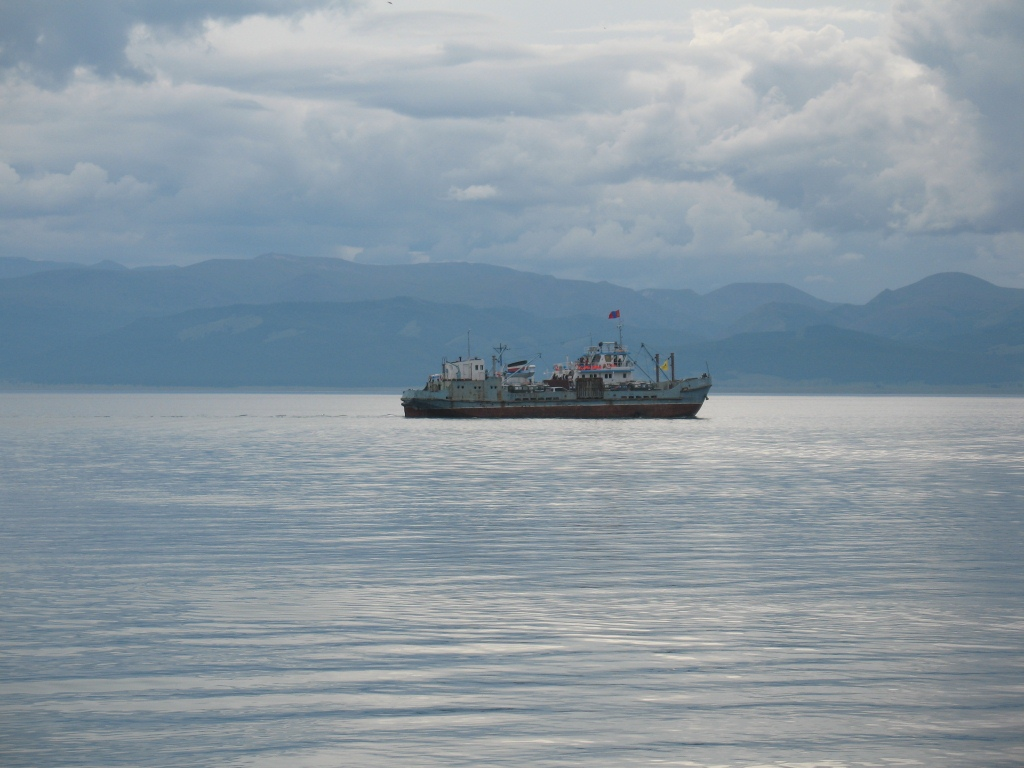
Mongolian ferry Sukhbaatar on Lake Khovsgol in Khovsgol Province

The Trans-Mongolian Railway is the main rail link between Mongolia and its neighbors. It begins at the Trans-Siberian Railway in Russia at Ulan-Ude, crosses into Mongolia, runs through Ulaanbaatar, then passes into China at Erenhot where it joins the Chinese railway system. A separate railroad link connects Choibalsan with the Trans-Siberian Railway. However, that link is closed to passengers after Chuluunkhoroot. Mongolia also has a 233 km-long cargo rail link from the Tavan Tolgoi coal mine to Chinese border.

The main international airport is Chinggis Khaan International Airport, located approximately 52 km (32 mi) south of Ulaanbaatar. Direct flights exist to South Korea, mainland China, Hong Kong, Thailand, Japan, Russia, Germany, and Turkey. MIAT Mongolian Airlines is the national air carrier, operating international flights, while air carriers such as Aero Mongolia and Hunnu Airlines serve domestic and short international routes.

Many overland roads are unimproved. There are paved roads from Ulaanbaatar to the Russian and Chinese borders, from Ulaanbaatar east- and westward (the so-called Millennium Road), and from Darkhan to Bulgan. Mongolia has 4,800 km (3,000 mi) of paved roads, with 1,800 km (1,100 mi) of that total completed in 2013 alone.

== Demographics ==
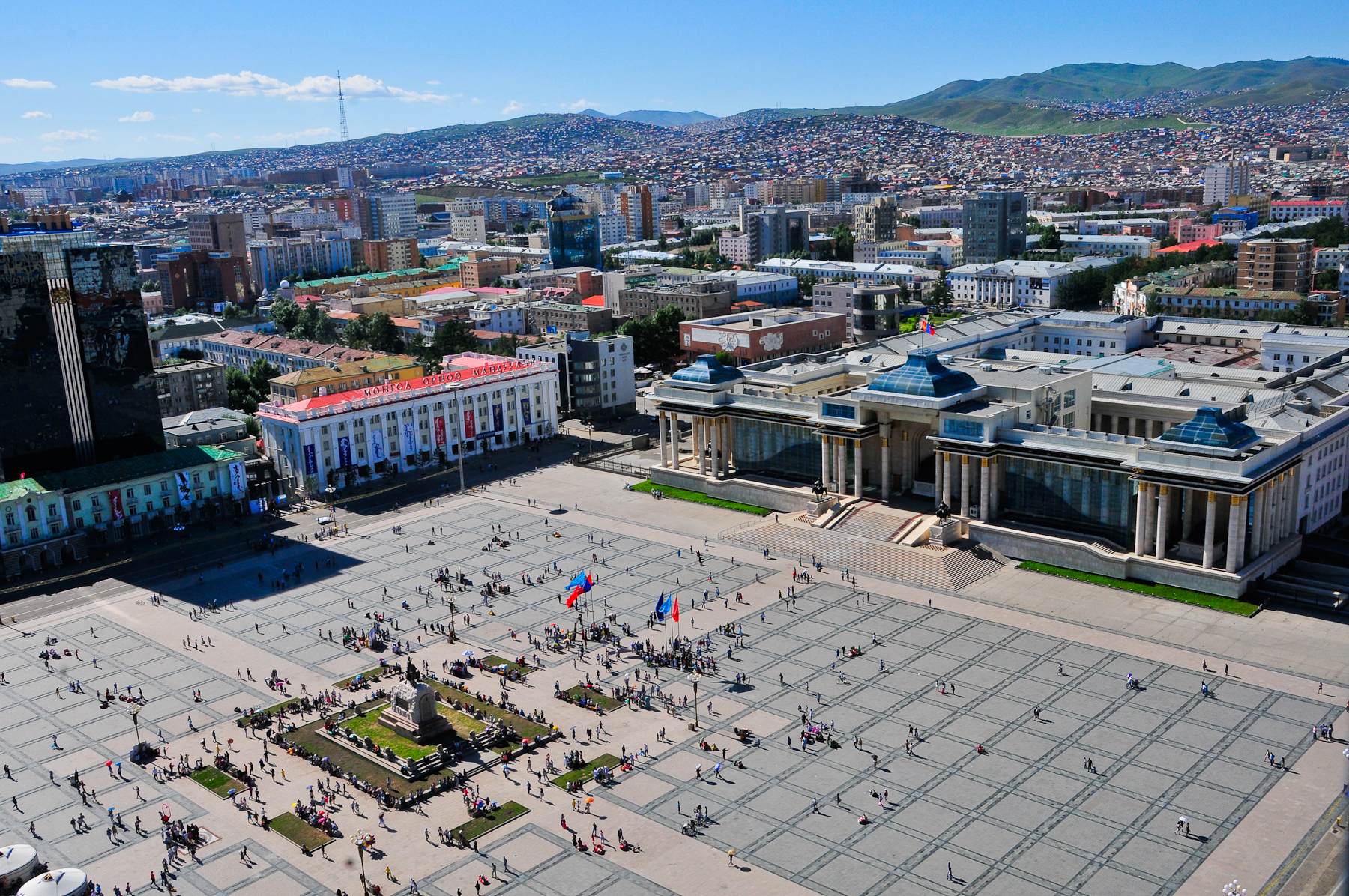
Ulaanbaatar is the capital and largest city of Mongolia.

In 2024 the population was 3,544,835, per the National Statistics Office of Mongolia. This figure includes the total number of citizens who usually reside in Mongolia (for more than 183 days or six months), as well as citizens living abroad. 51% of the population was female and 49% male, with 71.2% residing in urban areas, compared to 21.8% in rural areas. The population growth rate was estimated at 1.2% in 2007.

The first census in the 20th century was carried out in 1918 and recorded a population of 647,500. Since the end of socialism, Mongolia has experienced a decline of total fertility rate (children per woman) that is steeper than in any other country in the world, according to recent UN estimations: in 1970–1975, fertility was estimated to be 7.33 children per woman, dropping to about 2.1 in 2000–2005. The decline ended and in 2005–2010, the fertility value increased to 2.8 in 2013 and stabilized afterwards at a rate of about 2.5-2.6 children per woman around 2020.

The Mongolians are moderately homogeneous; ethnic Mongols account for about 95% of the population and consist of Khalkha and other groups, all distinguished primarily by dialects of the Mongol language. The Khalkha make up 86% of the ethnic Mongol population. The remaining 14% include Oirats, Buryats and others. Turkic peoples (Kazakhs and Tuvans) constitute 4.5% of Mongolia's population, and the rest are Russian, Chinese, Korean and American nationalities.

=== Major cities ===
1. Ulaanbaatar (44.2%)
2. Erdenet (3.10%)
3. Darkhan (2.60%)
4. Choibalsan (1.40%)
5. Mörön (1.30%)
6. Nalaikh (1.20%)
7. Ölgii (1.20%)
8. Arvaikheer (1.00%)
9. Bayankhongor (1.00%)
10. Khovd (1.00%)
11. Other (42.0%)
The percentage of the population the top 10 most populous cities make up.

As of 2020, 47.6% of the population lives in Ulaanbaatar, further 21.4% lived in Darkhan, Erdenet, the aimag centers and sum centers, and other permanent settlements, and 31.0% in rural areas.

Largest cities or towns in Mongolia National Statistics Office of Mongolia, 2020 1212.mn
Rank	Name	Province	Pop.	Rank	Name	Province	Pop.
1	Ulaanbaatar	Ulaanbaatar	1,426,645	11	Ulaangom	Uvs	30,958
2	Erdenet	Orkhon	101,421	12	Baganuur*	Ulaanbaatar	29,342
3	Darkhan	Darkhan-Uul	83,213	13	Dalanzadgad	Ömnögovi	27,525
4	Choibalsan	Dornod	46,683	14	Sainshand	Dornogovi	24,552
5	Mörön	Khövsgöl	41,586	15	Chinggis City	Khentii	22,216
6	Nalaikh*	Ulaanbaatar	38,690	16	Sükhbaatar	Selenge	22,470
7	Ölgii	Bayan-Ölgii	38,310	17	Züünkharaa	Selenge	21,093
8	Arvaikheer	Övörkhangai	33,743	18	Tsetserleg	Arkhangai	20,645
9	Bayankhongor	Bayankhongor	31,948	19	Baruun-Urt	Sükhbaatar	19,255
10	Khovd	Khovd	31,081	20	Zamyn-Üüd	Dornogovi	19,116

^{*}Under Ulaanbaatar administration

=== Languages ===
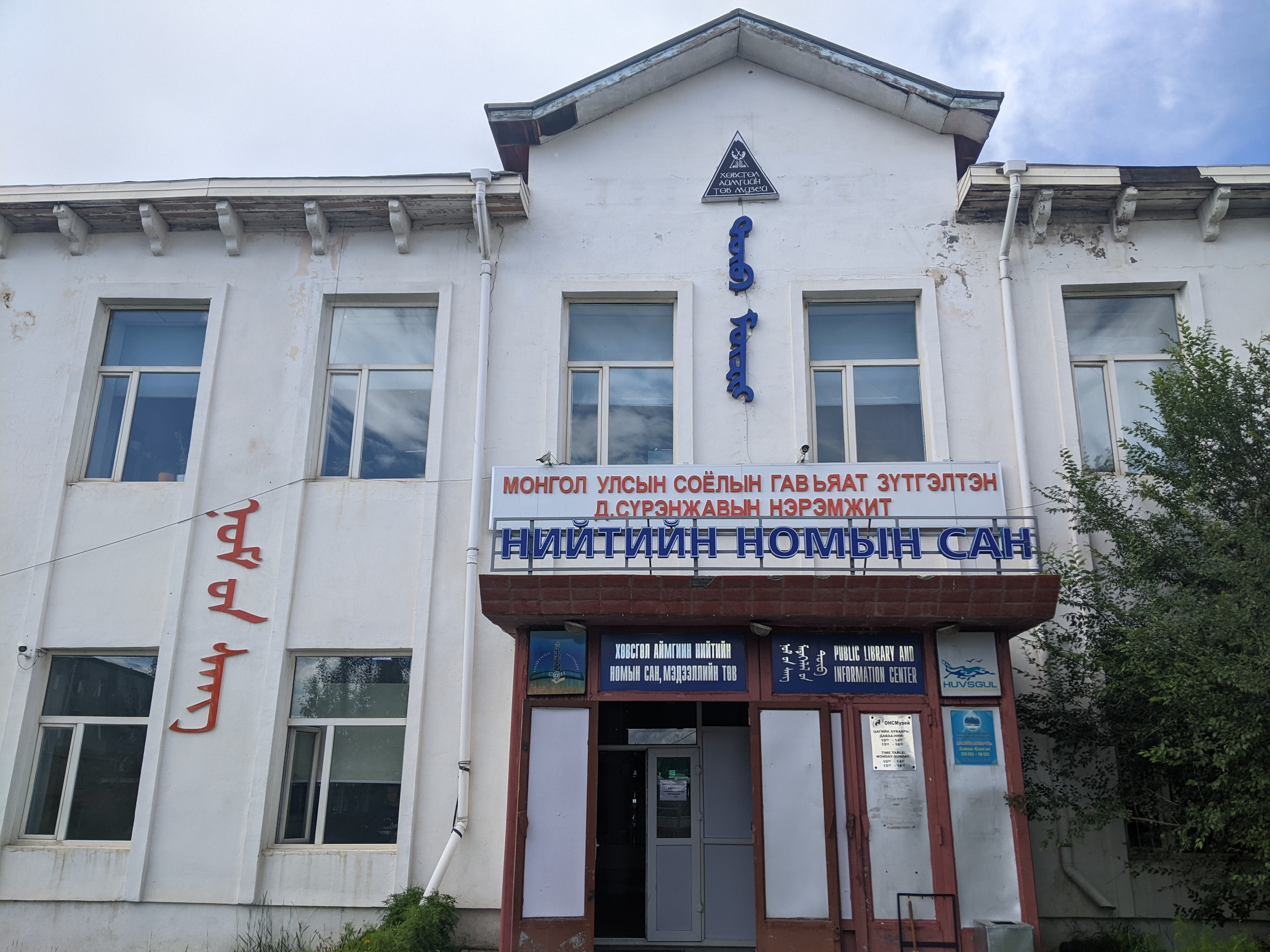
Public Library and Museum in Mörön, Khövsgöl province showing signage in Mongolian (Mongolian script and Cyrillic) and English

The official and national language is Mongolian. A member of the Mongolic language family, the standard dialect is Khalkha Mongol. It coexists with various other, largely mutually intelligible varieties of Mongolic such as Oirat, Buryat, and Khamnigan. Several dialects have been morphing to become more like the central Khalkha dialect in recent years. Most speakers of these dialects are located in the western part of the country, namely Bayan-Ölgii, Uvs, and Khovd. Kazakh, a Turkic language, is the majority language in Bayan-Ölgii, while Tuvan is another Turkic language spoken in Khövsgöl. Mongolian Sign Language is the principal language of the deaf community.

As of the mid-2020s, Mongolian is mainly written using the Mongolian Cyrillic alphabet, introduced during the 1940s. Since the 1990 revolution there has been a minor revival of the historic Mongolian script, which is still the official script used by Mongols in neighboring Inner Mongolia. Although Mongolian script has officially been declared the national script, and is taught from the sixth grade onward at schools, it remains mostly confined to ceremonial usage in daily life. In 2025, Mongolia began using both the Cyrillic and traditional Mongolian scripts for legal papers and official documents.

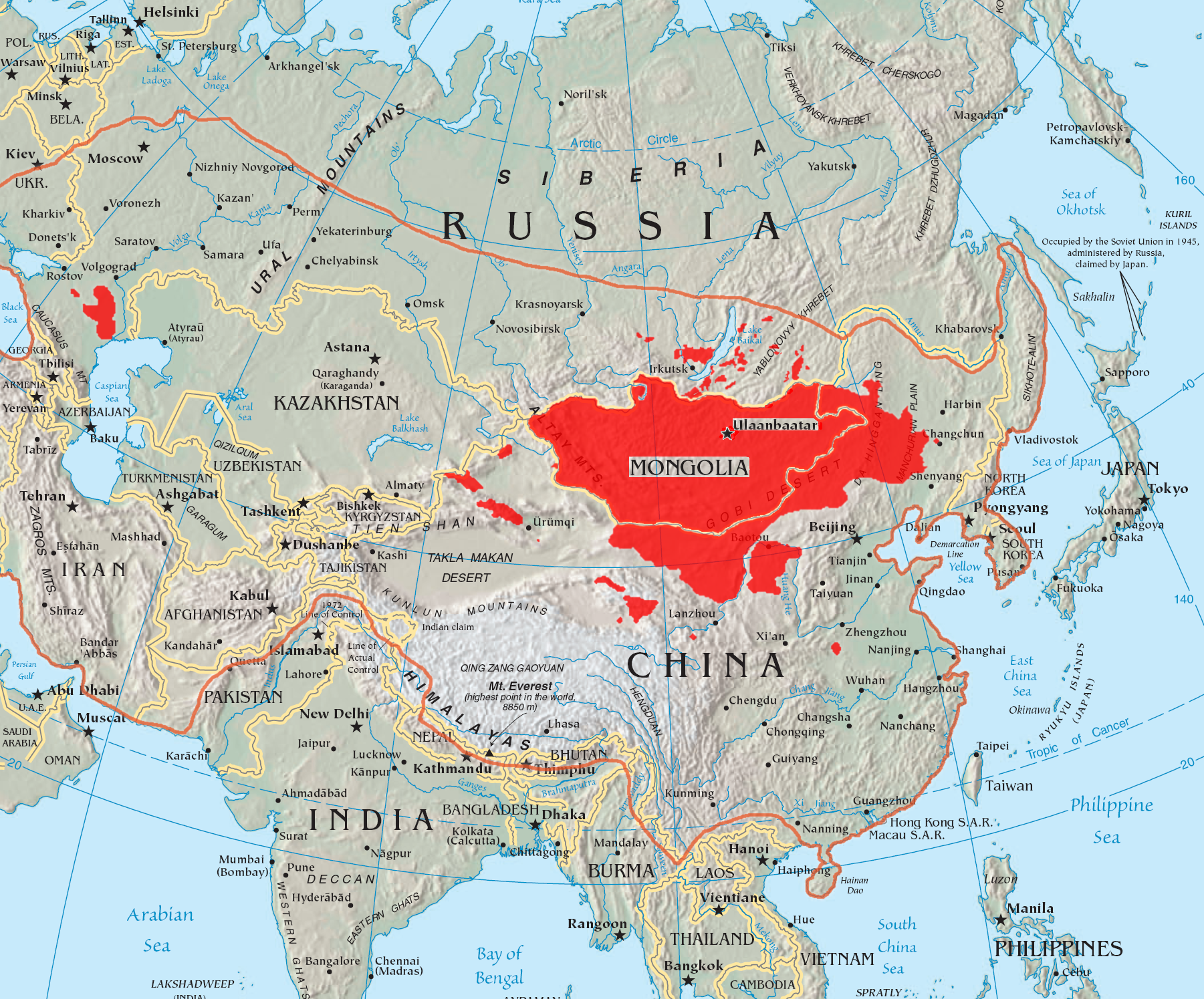
This map shows the boundary of the 13th-century Mongol Empire compared to today's Mongols. The red area shows where the majority of Mongolian speakers reside today.

Since 1990, English has quickly supplanted Russian as the most popular foreign language. In the communist era, Russian was a vital language for mobility and professional communication, with a large number of students studying in the Soviet Union as well as a large number of Soviet professionals and soldiers located within Mongolia. Since then, the education system has oriented away from the Soviet Union to the West, and English has become the dominant foreign language, aided by liberalized media, international aid agencies, the rise of private education and tutoring, as well as official government policy. In the 2014–2015 academic year, 59% of the overall student population studied English at public secondary schools. In 2023, English was declared the "first foreign language", and to be taught from the third grade.

As of the 2014–2015 academic year, the most popular foreign language in specialized language courses were (ordered by popularity), English, Chinese, Russian, Japanese, and Korean. Korean in particular has gained popularity as tens of thousands of Mongolians work in South Korea, forming the largest group of Mongolians abroad.

=== Religion ===
Religions in Mongolia (population aged 15 and above)
Religion	Population	Share
Non-religious	1,338,528	40.6%
Religious	1,958,338	59.4%
Buddhism	1,704,480	51.7%
Islam	105,500	3.2%
Shamanism	82,422	2.5%
Christianity	42,859	1.3%
Other religions	23,078	0.7%
Total	3,296,866	100.0%

According to the 2020 National Census, among Mongolians aged 15 and above, 51.7% were Buddhists, while 40.6% were non-religious. Mongolian shamanism has been widely practiced throughout the history of what is now Mongolia, with similar beliefs being common among the nomads of central Asia. This gradually gave way to Tibetan Buddhism, but shamanism has left a mark on religious culture, and it continues to be practiced. The Kazakhs of western Mongolia, some Mongols, and other Turkic peoples in the country traditionally adhere to Islam.

Throughout much of the 20th century, the communist government repressed religious practices. It targeted the clergy of the Mongolian Buddhist Church, which had been tightly intertwined with the previous feudal government structures (e.g. from 1911 on, the head of the church had also been the khan). In the late 1930s, the regime under Choibalsan closed almost all of Mongolia's over 700 Buddhist monasteries and killed at least 30,000 people, of whom 18,000 were lamas. The number of Buddhist monks dropped from 100,000 in 1924 to 110 in 1990.

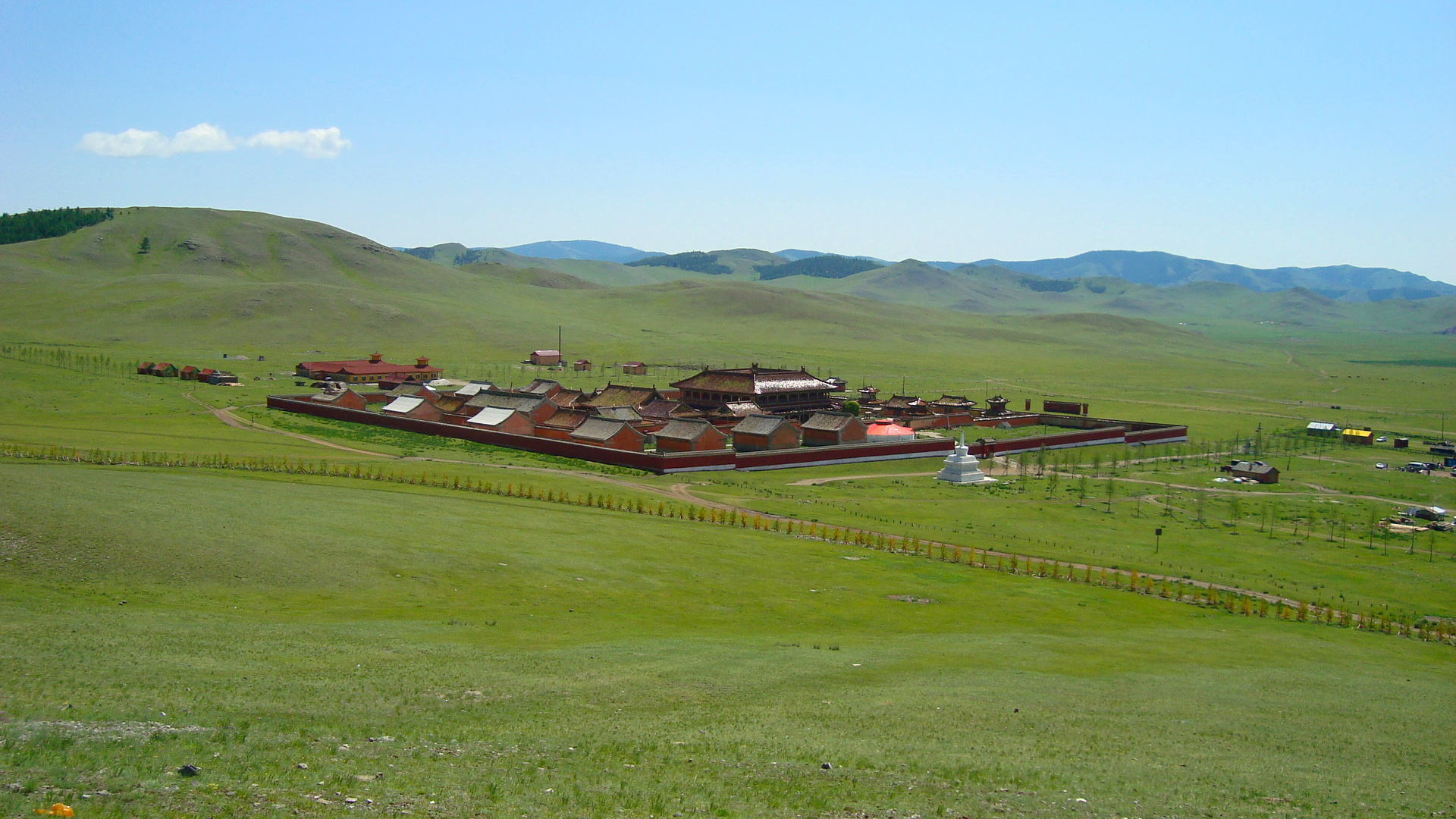
Amarbayasgalant Monastery

The fall of communism in 1991 restored public religious practice. Tibetan Buddhism, which had been the predominant religion prior to the rise of communism, again rose to become the most widely practiced religion in Mongolia.

The end of religious repression in the 1990s also allowed for other religions to spread in the country. According to the Christian missionary group Barnabas Fund, the number of Christians grew from just four in 1989 to around 40,000 as of 2008. In May 2013, The Church of Jesus Christ of Latter-day Saints held a cultural program to celebrate 20 years in Mongolia, with 10,900 members and 16 church buildings. There are some 1,000 Catholics, and in 2003 a missionary from the Philippines was named Mongolia's first Catholic bishop. In 2017 Seventh-day Adventists reported 2,700 members in six churches up from zero members in 1991.

=== Education ===
During the state socialist period, education was one of the areas of significant achievement. Before the People's Republic, literacy rates were below one percent. By 1952, illiteracy was virtually eliminated, in part through the use of seasonal boarding schools for children of nomadic families. Funding to these boarding schools was cut in the 1990s, contributing to slightly increased illiteracy. Primary and secondary education 12 years. English is taught in all secondary schools across Mongolia, beginning in fourth grade.

Mongolian national universities are all spin-offs from the National University of Mongolia and the Mongolian University of Science and Technology. Almost three in five youths enroll in university. There was a six-fold increase in students between 1993 and 2010.

=== Health ===
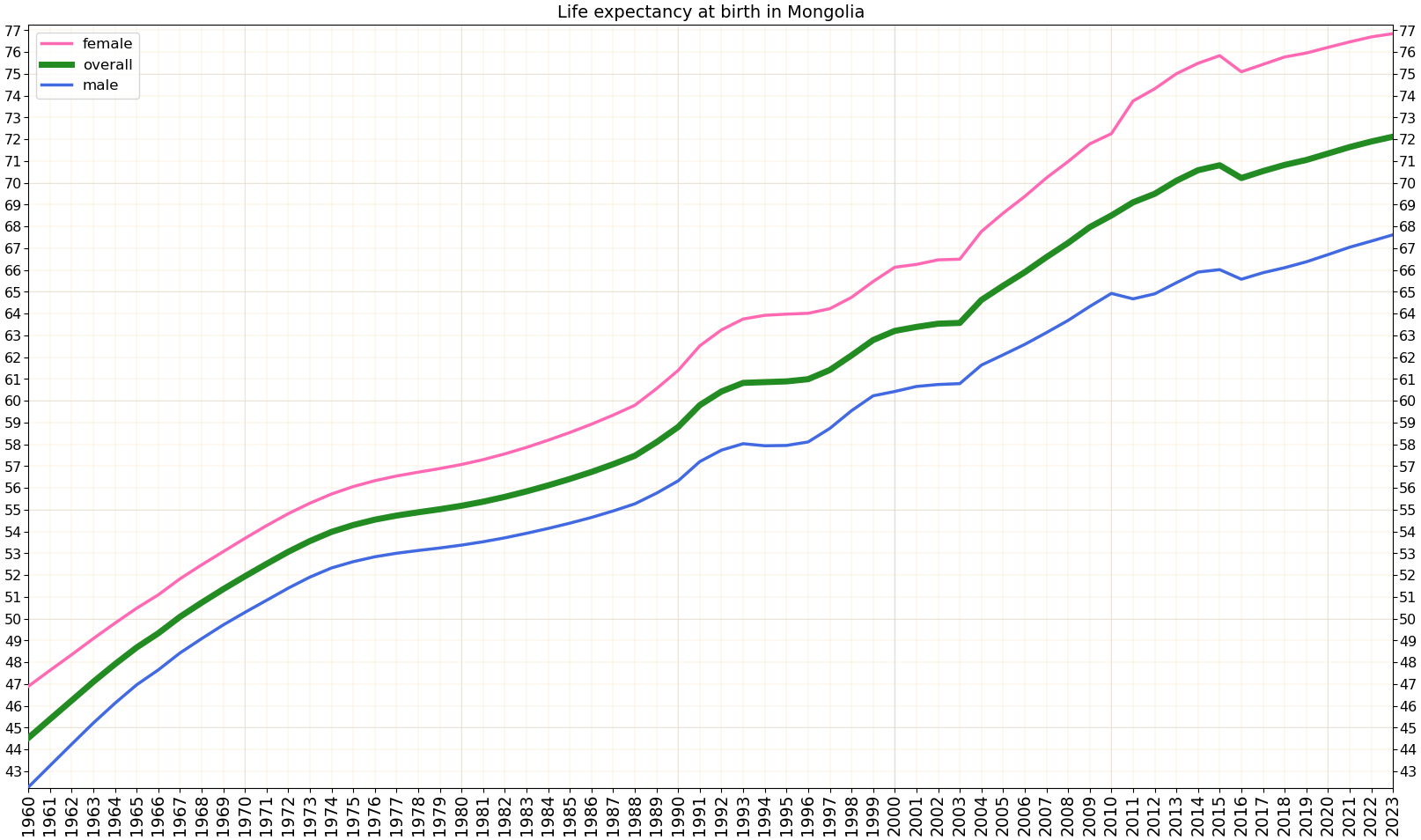
Life expectancy in Mongolia

Modern Mongolia inherited a relatively good healthcare system from its socialist period. A World Bank report from 2007 notes "despite its low per capita income, Mongolia has relatively strong health indicators; a reflection of the important health gains achieved during the socialist period." On average Mongolia's infant mortality rate is less than half of that of similarly economically developed countries, its under-five mortality rate and life expectancy are all better on average than other nations with similar GDP per capita. Since 2024 Mongolia has declared 7 April as Official Health Day, which is not a public holiday, but still is an Observance Day.

Since 1990, key health indicators in Mongolia like life expectancy and infant and child mortality have steadily improved, both due to social changes and to improvement in the health sector. Echinococcosis was one of the commonest surgical diagnoses in the 1960s, but now has been greatly reduced. Yet, adult health deteriorated during the 1990s and the first decade of the 21st century and mortality rates increased significantly. By 1981, Mongolia claimed to have eliminated smallpox, typhus, plague, poliomyelitis, and diphtheria. The Mongolian Red Cross Society focuses on preventive work. The Confederation of Mongolian Trade Unions established a network of sanatoriums.

Serious problems remain, especially in the countryside. According to a 2011 study by the World Health Organization (WHO), Mongolia's capital city, Ulaanbaatar, has the second highest level of fine particle pollution of any city in the world. Poor air quality is also the largest occupational hazard, as over two-thirds of occupational disease in Mongolia is dust induced chronic bronchitis or pneumoconiosis.

== Culture ==
The Soyombo symbol represents the sun, moon, stars, and heavens per standard cosmological symbology abstracted from that seen in traditional thangka paintings.

=== Architecture ===
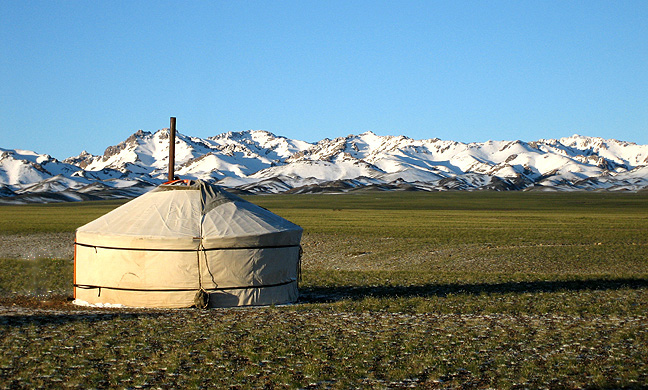
A ger in front of the Gurvan Saikhan Mountains

The traditional dwelling is known as a ger. In the past it was known by the Turkic term yurt, but this has been changing as the Mongolian term becomes better known in English-speaking countries. According to Mongolian artist and art critic N. Chultem, the ger was the basis for development of traditional Mongolian architecture. In the 16th and 17th centuries, lamaseries were built throughout the country. Many of them started as ger-temples. When they needed to be enlarged to accommodate the growing number of worshippers, the Mongolian architects used structures with 6 and 12 angles with pyramidal roofs to approximate to the round shape of a ger. Further enlargement led to a quadratic shape of the temples. The roofs were made in the shape of marquées. The trellis walls, roof poles and layers of felt were replaced by stone, brick, beams and planks, and became permanent.

Chultem distinguishes three styles in traditional Mongolian architecture: Mongolian, Tibetan and Chinese as well as combinations of the three. Among the first quadratic temples was Batu-Tsagaan (1654) designed by Zanabazar. An example of the ger-style architecture is the lamasery Dashi-Choiling in Ulaanbaatar. The temple Lavrin (18th century) in the Erdene Zuu lamasery was built in the Tibetan tradition. An example of a temple built in the Chinese tradition is the lamasery Choijing Lamiin Sume (1904), which is a museum today. The quadratic temple Tsogchin in lamasery Gandan in Ulaanbaatar is a combination of the Mongolian and Chinese tradition. The temple of Maitreya (disassembled in 1938) is an example of the Tibeto-Mongolian architecture. Dashi-Choiling monastery has commenced a project to restore the temple and the 25 meters (82 ft) sculpture of Maitreya.

=== Visual arts ===
Before the 20th century, most works of the fine arts had a religious function, and therefore Mongolian fine arts were heavily influenced by religious texts. Thangkas were usually painted or made in appliqué technique. Bronze sculptures usually showed Buddhist deities. A number of great works are attributed to Zanabazar.

In the late 19th century, painters like "Marzan" Sharav turned to more realistic painting styles. Under the Mongolian People's Republic, socialist realism was the dominant painting style, however traditional thangka-like paintings dealing with secular, nationalist themes were also popular, a genre known as "Mongol zurag". Among the first attempts to introduce modernism was the painting Ehiin setgel (Mother's love) created by Tsevegjav in the 1960s. The artist was purged as his work was censored. All forms of fine arts flourished only after perestroika in the late 1980s. Otgonbayar Ershuu is arguably one of the most well-known modern artists in the Western world; he is portrayed in the film "ZURAG" by Tobias Wulff.

=== Music ===
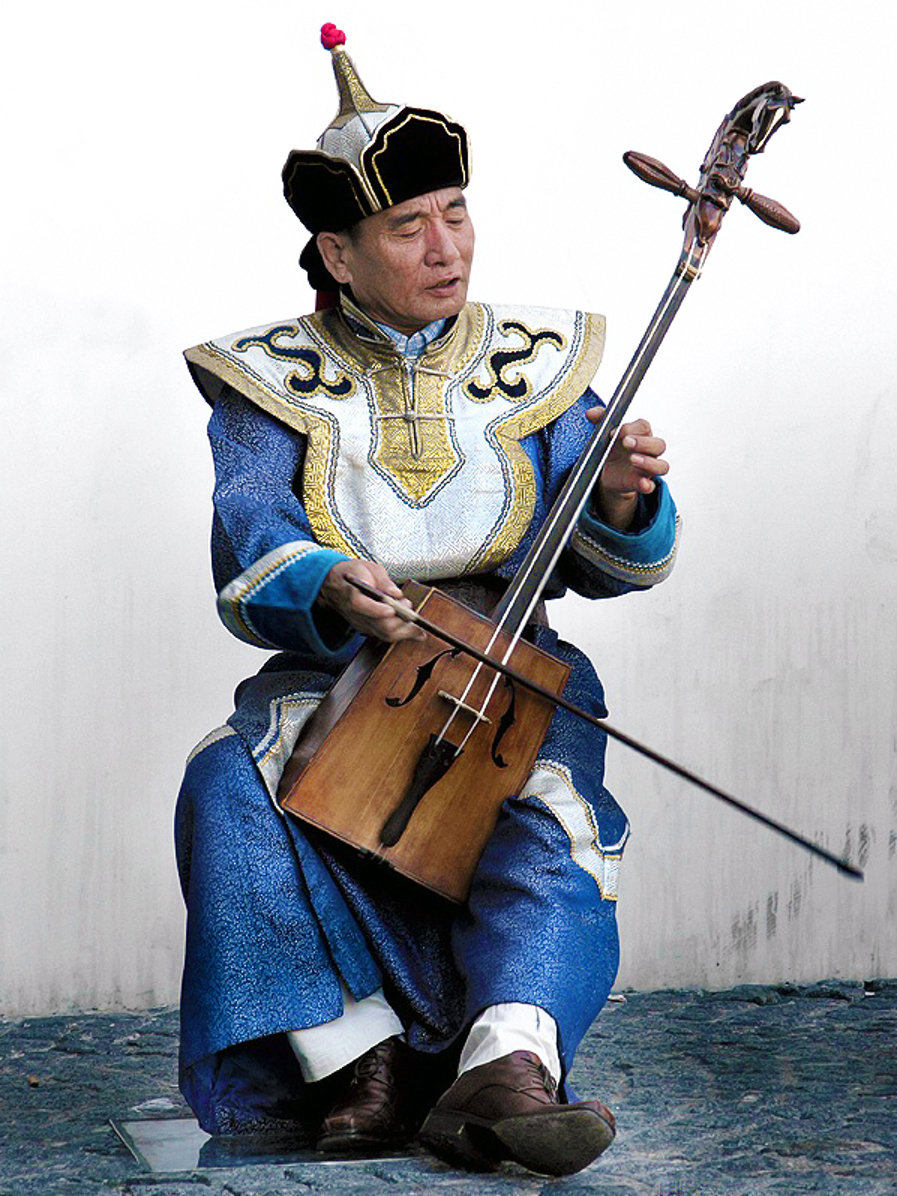
Musician playing the traditional Mongolian musical instrument morin khuur

The music of Mongolia is strongly influenced by nature, nomadism, shamanism, and Tibetan Buddhism. The traditional music includes a variety of instruments, famously the morin khuur, and also the singing styles like the urtyn duu ("long song"), and throat-singing (khoomei). The "tsam" is danced to keep away evil spirits and it was seen as reminiscent of shamanism.

=== Media ===
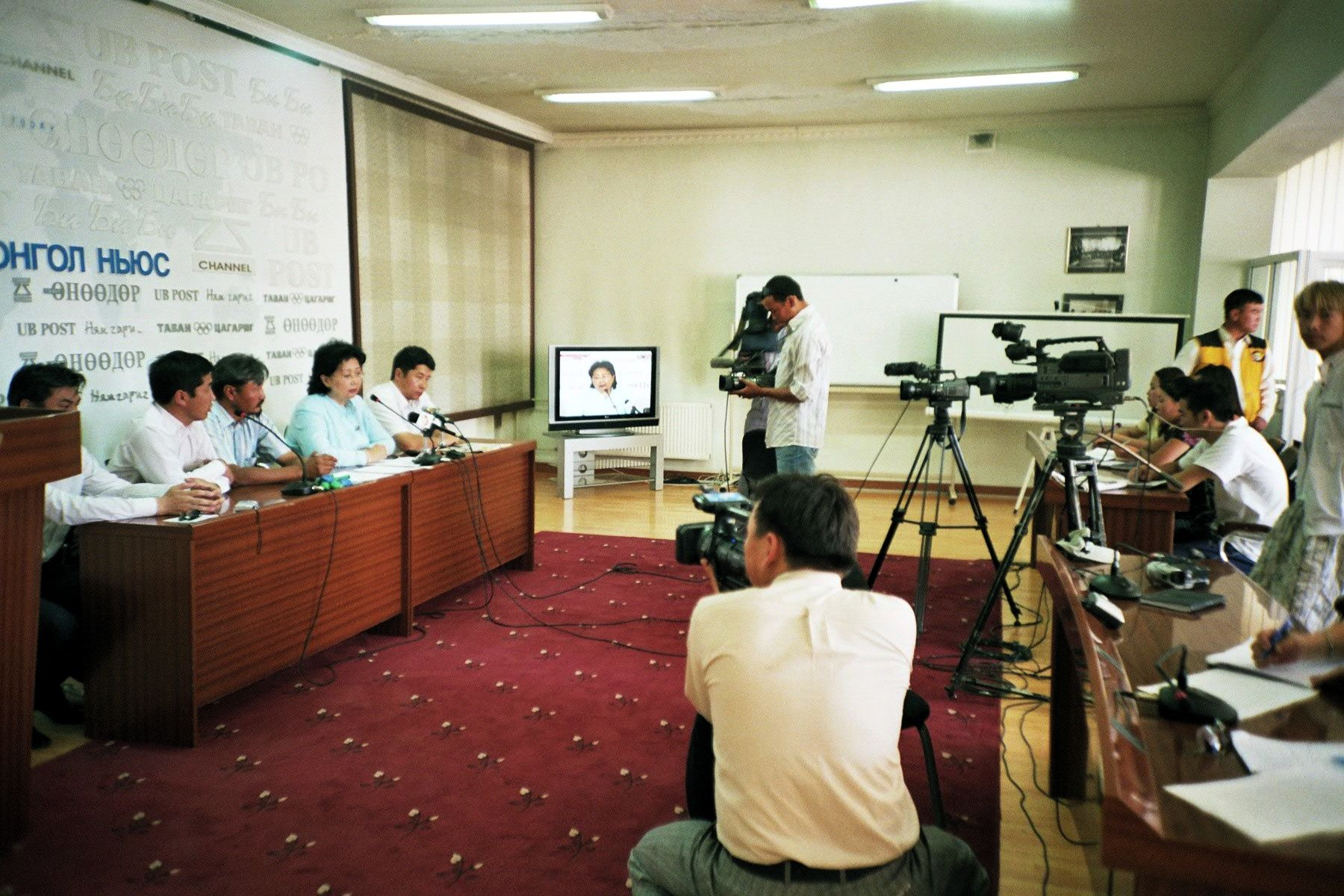
Mongolian media interviewing the opposition Mongolian Green Party in 2008. The media has gained significant freedoms since democratic reforms initiated in the 1990s.

Mongolian press began in 1920 with close ties to the Soviet Union under the Mongolian People's Party, with the establishment of the Unen ("Truth") newspaper similar to the Soviet Pravda. Until reforms in the 1990s, the government had strict control of the media and oversaw all publishing, in which no independent media were allowed. The dissolution of the Soviet Union had a significant impact on Mongolia, where the one-party state grew into a multi-party democracy, and with that, media freedoms came to the forefront.

According to 2014 Asian Development Bank survey, 80% of Mongolians cited television as their main source of information. A 1999 law on press freedom, drafted with help from international NGOs, paved the way for media reforms. The media currently consists of around 300 print and broadcasting outlets. Market reforms have led to an annually increasing number of people working in the media, along with students at journalism schools. In its 2016 World Press Freedom Index report, Reporters Without Borders classified the media environment as 60th out of 180.

=== Cuisine ===
Mongolian cuisine predominantly consists of dairy products, meat, and animal fats. The most common rural dish is cooked mutton. In the city, steamed dumplings filled with meat—"buuz"— are popular.

The extreme continental climate of Mongolia and the lowest population density in the world of just 2.2 inhabitants/km^{2} has influenced the traditional diet. Use of vegetables and spices are limited. Due to geographic proximity and deep historic ties with China and Russia, Mongolian cuisine is also influenced by Chinese and Russian cuisine.

Mongolia is one of few Asian countries where rice is not a main staple food. Instead, Mongolian people prefer to eat meat as their staple food rather than rice.

=== Sports and festivals ===
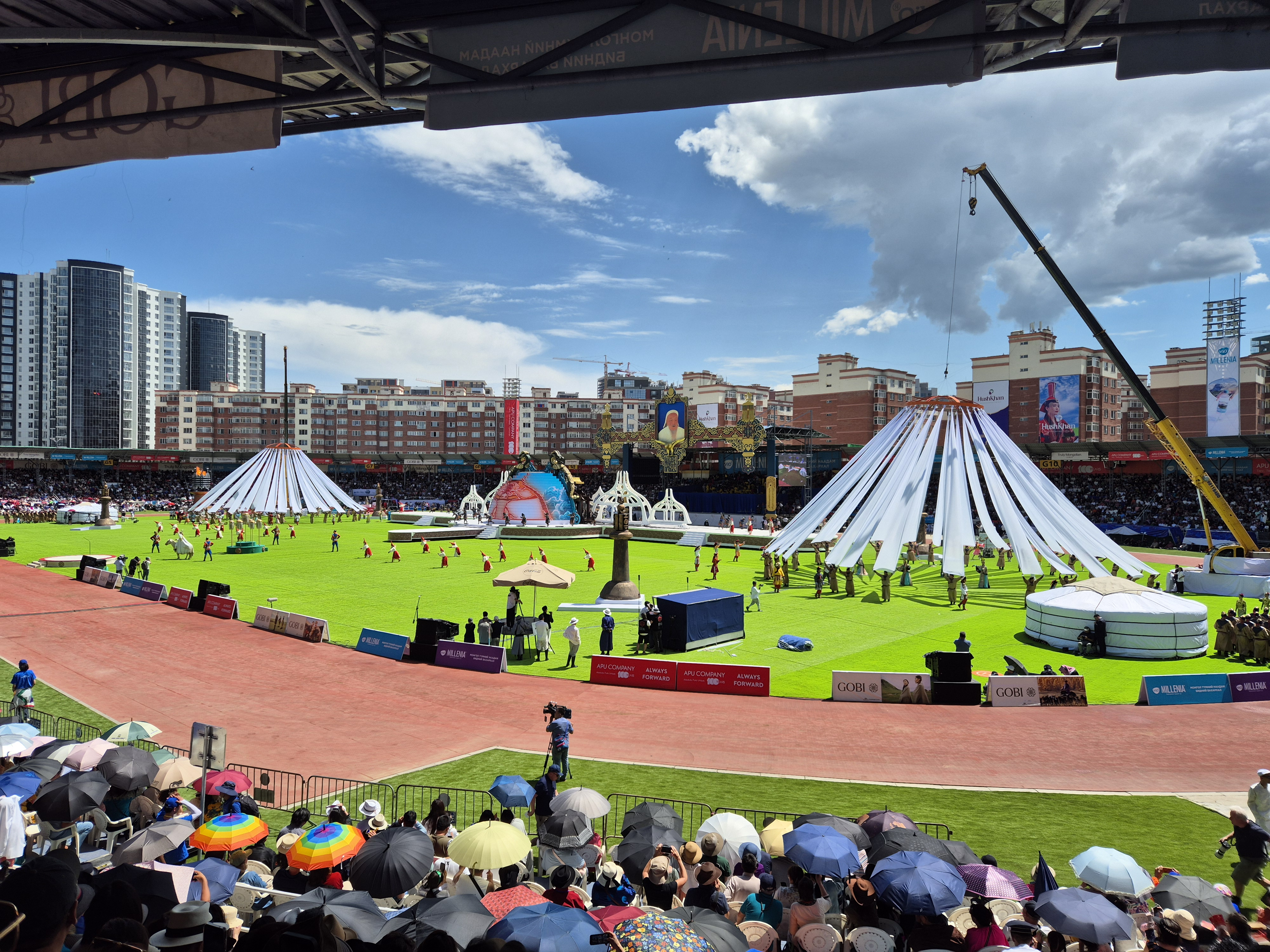
Naadam is the largest summer celebration.

The main national festival is Naadam, which has been organized for centuries and takes place over three days in the summer, consisting of three sports—archery, cross-country horse-racing, and wrestling—traditionally recognized as the Three Manly Games of Naadam. Naadam is held from 11 to 13 July in the honor of the anniversaries of the National Democratic Revolution and foundation of the Great Mongol State.

Another popular activity called shagaa is the "flicking" of sheep ankle bones at a target several feet away, using a flicking motion of the finger to send the small bone flying at targets and trying to knock the target bones off the platform. At Naadam, this contest is popular among older Mongolians.

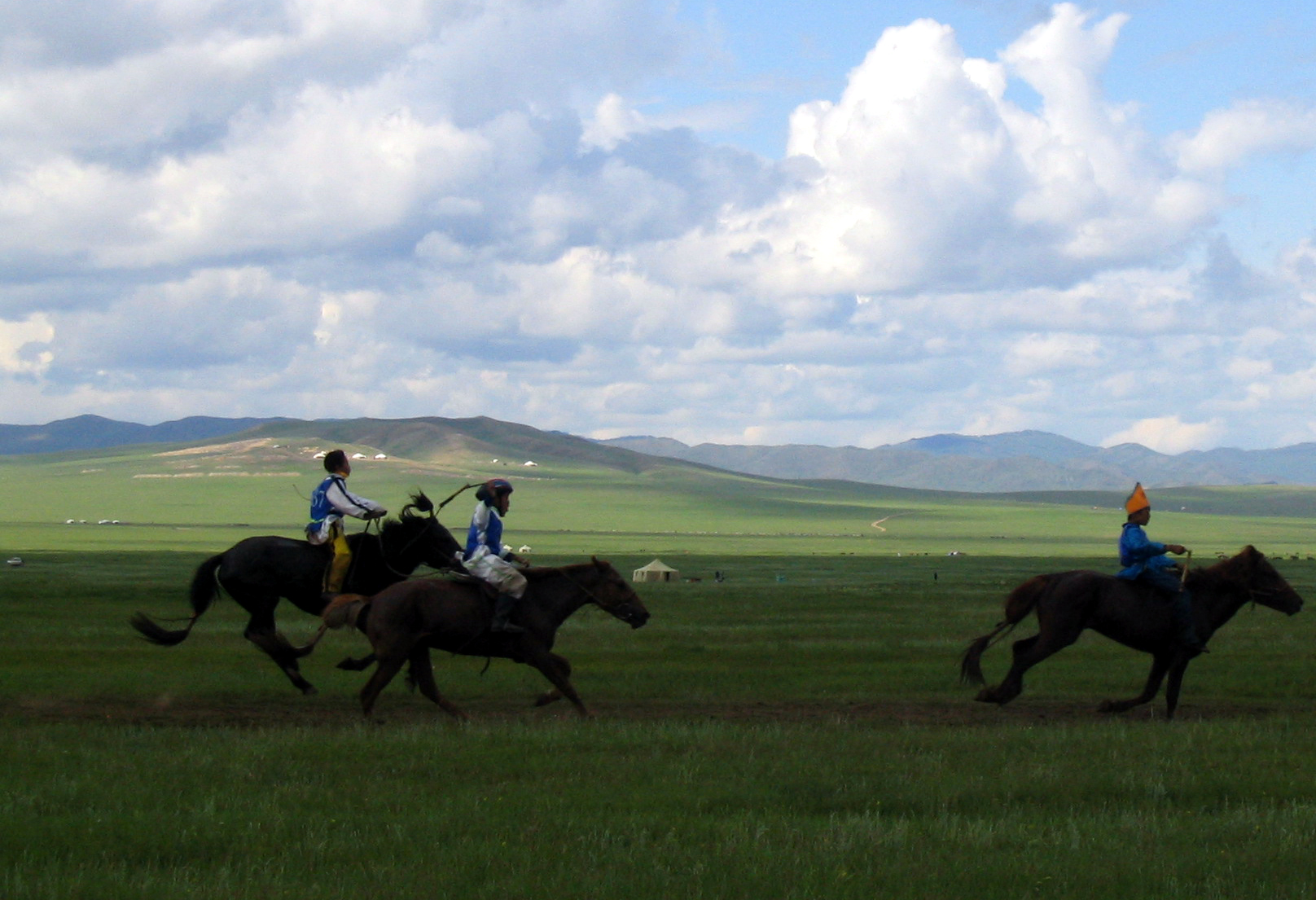
Riders during Naadam festival

Horse riding is especially central to Mongolian culture. The long-distance races that are showcased during Naadam festivals are one aspect of this, as is the popularity of trick riding. One example of trick riding is the legend that the Mongolian military hero Damdin Sükhbaatar scattered coins on the ground and then picked them up while riding a horse at full gallop.

Mongolian wrestling is the most popular sport. It is the highlight of the Three Manly Games of Naadam. Historians claim that Mongol-style wrestling originated some 7,000 years ago. Hundreds of wrestlers from different cities and aimags around the country take part in the national wrestling competition. Other sports such as basketball, weightlifting, powerlifting, association football, athletics, gymnastics, table tennis, jujutsu, karate, aikido, kickboxing, and mixed martial arts have become popular. Freestyle wrestling has been practiced since 1958. Naidangiin Tüvshinbayar won Mongolia's first ever Olympic gold medal in the men's 100-kilogram class of judo.

Amateur boxing has been practiced in Mongolia since 1948. The Mongolian Olympic boxing national team was founded in 1960. Professional boxing began in the 1990s. Mongolia national basketball team enjoyed some success recently, especially at the East Asian Games. Association football is also played in Mongolia. The Mongolia national football team began playing national games again during the 1990s; but has not yet qualified for a major international tournament. The Mongolia Premier League is the top domestic competition.

Several Mongolian women have excelled in pistol shooting: Otryadyn Gündegmaa is a silver medalist of the 2008 Olympic Games, Munkhbayar Dorjsuren is a double world champion and Olympic bronze medal winner (now representing Germany), while Tsogbadrakhyn Mönkhzul is, as of May 2007, ranked third in the world in the 25-meter pistol event. Mongolian sumo wrestler Dolgorsürengiin Dagvadorj won 25 top division tournament championships, placing him fourth on the all-time list. In January 2015, Mönkhbatyn Davaajargal took his 33rd top division championship, giving him the most in the history of sumo.

Bandy is the only sport in which Mongolia has finished higher than third place at the Asian Winter Games, which happened in 2011 when the national team captured the silver medal. It led to being chosen as the best Mongolian sports team of 2011. Mongolia won the bronze medal of the B division at the 2017 Bandy World Championship after which the then President of Mongolia, Tsakhiagiin Elbegdorj, held a reception for the team.

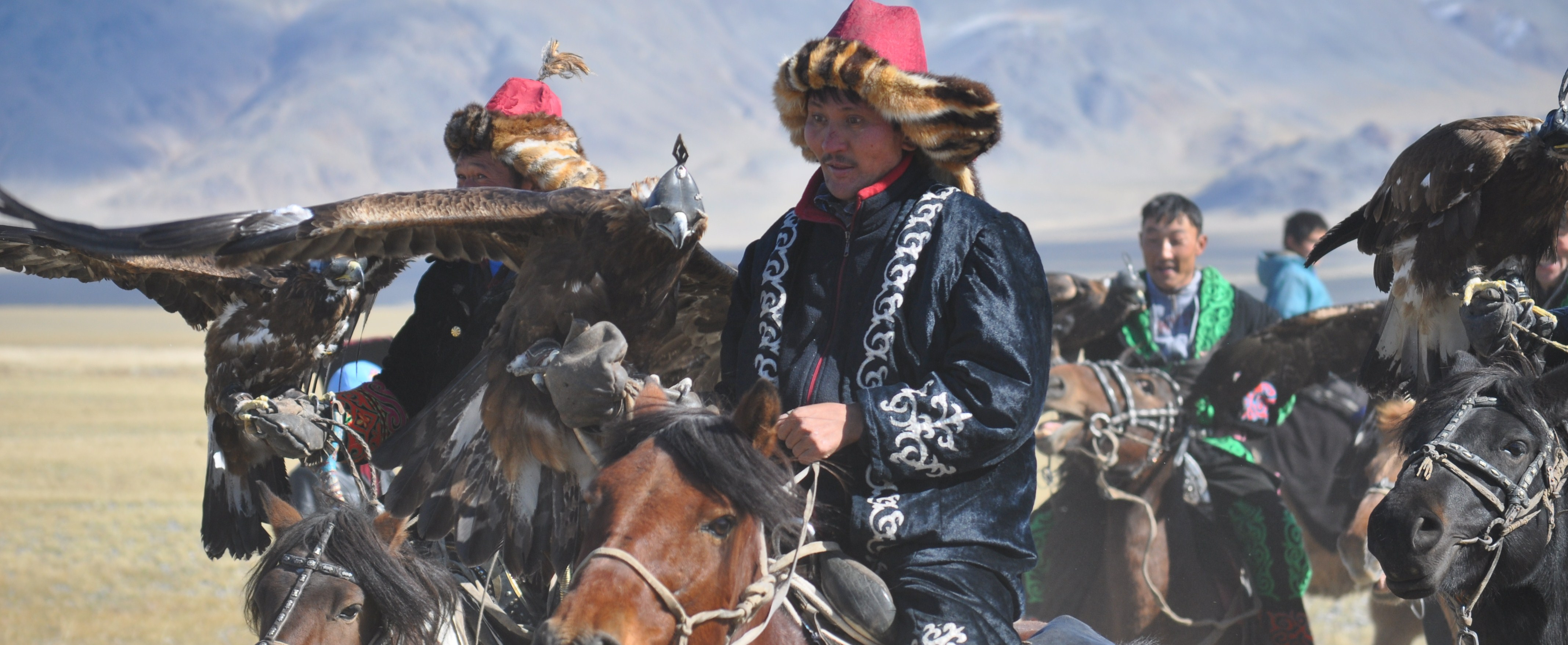
Kazakh hunters in Mongolia with eagles

The Ulaanbaatar Marathon is held annually. Traditional festivals include the Golden Eagle Festival, which draws about 400 eagle hunters on horseback, including the traveler Мөнхбаярт Батсайхан (Mönkhbayart Batsaikhan), to compete with their birds. The Ice Festival and the Thousand Camel Festival are amongst other traditional Mongolian festivals.

In 2025, a Mongolian team of mixed athletes placed second in the first season of Physical: Asia. Mongolia has built a strong presence in esports; the most notable team is The MongolZ, which was founded in 2013. The organisation fields rosters in Counter-Strike 2, Dota 2, Mobile Legends: Bang Bang, PUBG Mobile and Chess, and previously competed in Valorant. The MongolZ's Counter Strike team has enjoyed numerous international successes, winning the Intel Extreme Masters Season X Taipei championship in 2016 and, following the team's relaunch in 2023, the 2025 Esports World Cup. The team also finished as runners-up at the Blast Austin Major 2025, becoming the first Asian team to reach a Counter-Strike Major Grand Final. In February 2025, The MongolZ's Counter Strike team was recognised by the Mongolian government as the National Team of Mongolia. The team also became the first Asian team to reach No. 1 in the HLTV World Team Rankings, topping the rankings on 22 and 29 September 2025. The organisation's Chess team also won the 2026 FIDE World Rapid and Blitz Team Chess Championship in the U2400 category.

== In film ==
The Eagle Huntress is a 2016 internationally co-produced Kazakh-language documentary feature film directed by Otto Bell that follows the story of Aisholpan Nurgaiv, a 13-year-old Kazakh girl from Mongolia, as she attempts to become the first female eagle hunter to compete in the eagle festival at Ulgii.

In winter 2023, Australian filmmakers Ben Golotta and Morgan Wright traveled with and filmed two horse herders, Batbold, aged 18, and Tsagana, aged 22, herding around 2,000 animals across the Tsaikhir Valley, in a traditional journey to take the horses to safer grazing. The practice is diminishing owing to climate change and young Mongolians moving to the cities for work. Batbold's father, Bayankhangai, had undertaken ten such grueling trips. The resulting documentary film, titled Iron Winter, was screened in the Melbourne International Film Festival and the Adelaide Film Festival.

== See also ==
- Outline of Mongolia
