= Demographics of Mongolia =

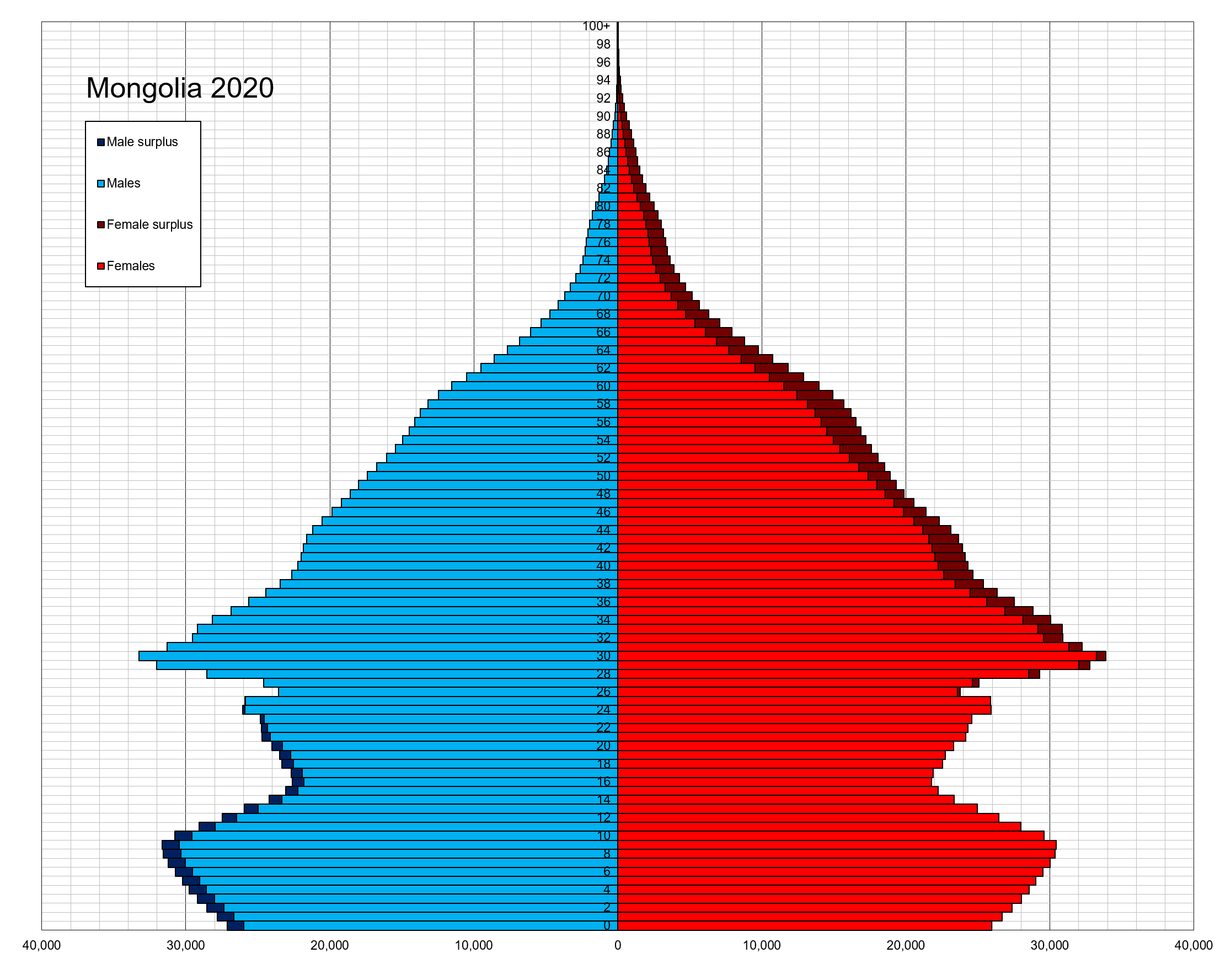
- Mongolia population pyramid in 2020
- Population: 3,296,866 (2020 census)
- Density: 1.76/km^{2}
- Growth rate: 1.46% (2010 census)
- Birth rate: 20.7 births/1,000 population (2012 est.)
- Death rate: 6.01 deaths/1,000 population (2012 est.)
- Life expectancy: 68.63 years (2012 est.)
  - male: 66.16 years (2012 est.)
  - female: 71.23 years (2012 est.)
- Fertility rate: 2.87 (2019 est.)
- Infant mortality: 13.4 deaths/1,000 live births (2019 est.)

Age structure
- 0–14 years: 27.1% (2012 est.)
- 15–64 years: 68.9% (2012 est.)
- 65 and over: 4% (2012 est.)

Sex ratio
- Total: 1 male(s)/female (2012 est.)
- At birth: 1.05 male(s)/female (2012 est.)
- Under 15: 1.04 male(s)/female (2012 est.)
- 15–64 years: 1 male(s)/female (2012 est.)
- 65 and over: 0.77 male(s)/female (2012 est.)

Nationality
- Nationality: Mongolian
- Major ethnic: Mongol
- Minor ethnic: Kazakh

Language
- Official: Mongolian
- Spoken: Mongolian, Kazakh

This article on the demographics of Mongolia include population density, ethnicity, religious affiliations, and other aspects of the population. All data are from the National Statistics Office of Mongolia, unless otherwise mentioned. The population at 2020 was around 3.3 million.

== Population size and structure ==
Historical population of Mongolia

=== Structure of the population ===
Population by Sex and Age Group (Census 11.XI.2010):

Age group	Male	Female	Total	%
Total	1 313 968	1 333 577	2 647 545	100
0–4	146 516	141 981	288 497	10.90
5–9	110 117	106 097	216 214	8.17
10–14	120 064	116 801	236 865	8.95
15–19	130 560	127 085	257 645	9.73
20–24	147 472	144 711	292 183	11.04
25–29	124 490	123 493	247 983	9.37
30–34	111 976	110 546	222 522	8.40
35–39	100 819	101 564	202 383	7.64
40–44	88 273	90 994	179 267	6.77
45–49	77 475	81 281	158 756	6.00
50–54	58 009	64 073	122 082	4.61
55–59	33 384	38 605	71 989	2.72
60–64	22 106	27 347	49 453	1.87
65–69	17 262	20 970	38 232	1.44
70–74	13 081	16 251	29 332	1.11
75–79	7 252	11 365	18 617	0.70
80–84	3 258	5 908	9 166	0.35
85–89	1 378	3 037	4 415	0.17
90–94	383	1 076	1 459	0.06
95–99	80	322	402	0.02
100+	13	70	83	<0.01
Age group	Male	Female	Total	Percent
0–14	376 697	364 879	741 576	28.01
15–64	894 564	909 699	1 804 263	68.15
65+	42 707	58 999	101 706	3.84

Population Estimates by Sex and Age Group (01.VII.2013) :

Age group	Male	Female	Total	%
Total	1 409 648	1 489 363	2 899 011	100
0–4	158 578	153 763	312 341	10.77
5–9	121 534	118 706	240 240	8.29
10–14	119 093	116 891	235 984	8.14
15–19	125 751	127 324	253 075	8.73
20–24	149 565	154 323	303 888	10.48
25–29	143 113	149 877	292 990	10.11
30–34	122 710	130 973	253 683	8.75
35–39	111 396	119 629	231 025	7.97
40–44	95 134	104 034	199 168	6.87
45–49	82 000	91 869	173 868	6.00
50–54	65 965	75 237	141 201	4.87
55–59	42 749	50 508	93 257	3.22
60–64	25 525	31 862	57 386	1.98
65–69	17 524	22 340	39 864	1.38
70–74	14 689	18 102	32 790	1.13
75–79	8 092	11 753	19 845	0.68
80–84	4 126	7 454	11 580	0.40
85–89	1 512	3 020	4 532	0.16
90–94	509	1 343	1 852	0.06
95–99	73	281	354	0.01
100+	15	80	95	<0.01
Age group	Male	Female	Total	Percent
0–14	399 205	389 360	788 565	27.20
15–64	963 903	1 035 630	1 999 533	68.97
65+	46 540	64 373	110 913	3.83

Population by Sex and Age Group (Census 09.I.2020):

Age group	Male	Female	Total	%
Total	1 576 930	1 620 090	3 197 020	100
0–4	196 803	186 456	383 259	11.99
5–9	188 352	179 962	368 314	11.52
10–14	140 208	134 666	274 874	8.60
15–19	110 141	106 626	216 767	6.78
20–24	113 271	112 114	225 385	7.05
25–29	130 143	129 056	259 199	8.11
30–34	143 491	143 359	286 850	8.97
35–39	119 621	120 173	239 794	7.50
40–44	106 169	109 049	215 218	6.73
45–49	93 162	98 495	191 657	5.99
50–54	76 257	86 183	162 440	5.08
55–59	64 238	76 928	141 166	4.42
60–64	41 768	54 458	96 226	3.01
65–69	22 808	32 535	55 343	1.73
70–74	12 878	19 928	32 806	1.03
75–79	9 984	15 179	25 163	0.79
80–84	4 918	8 293	13 211	0.41
85–89	2 069	4 792	6 861	0.21
90–94	527	1 370	1 897	0.06
95–99	110	401	511	0.02
100+	12	67	79	<0.01
Age group	Male	Female	Total	Percent
0–14	525 363	501 084	1 026 447	32.11
15–64	998 261	1 036 441	2 034 702	63.64
65+	53 306	82 565	135 871	4.25

=== Youth ===
Youth in Mongolia constituted 18.7% of the population in 2014, numbering roughly 552,000 individuals. The 15–19 age group is the largest in Mongolia; in 2009 about 40% of the population was under 19 years old. Estimated population growth rates as of 2014 were reported as increasing by 1.37%. The steady increase in youth will enlarge the already large proportion of working-aged individuals and create new opportunities to build human capital and facilitate economic development.

In order to address Mongolia's economic future, Mongolia's Parliament adopted the State Population Development Policy in 2004 to confront development issues facing Mongolian youth. This policy and the Mongolia National Programme on Adolescents and Youth Development defined youth as those from ages 15 to 34 years and aims to provide opportunities and services that build youth into well developed citizens. Mongolia is in the process of transitioning from its status as a developing country to a nation with a developing economy. According to the Human Development Index, conditions in Mongolia have been improving in recent years, but its ranking on the Human Poverty Index has dropped further due to the privatization of the economic sector.

Mongolia's political structure has changed frequently since its founding in 1206. In the most recent transition to democracy in 1992, Mongolia incorporated policies directed towards youth. Mongolia became one of the first countries to ratify the Convention on the Rights of the Child in 1990 and signed the second and third optional protocols in 2000 and 2013 respectively. Many of Mongolia's laws and policies attempt to protect and better the lives of Mongolian youth. The legal age of majority occurs at 18, wherein Mongolian young adults are able to vote and assume legal authority. The transition from a Soviet satellite state to a sovereign nation in 1992 fueled major structural changes in Mongolian youth lives. Access to education, employment, and health care has increased.

=== Urbanization ===
Life in sparsely populated Mongolia has become more urbanized. Nearly half of the people live in the capital, Ulaanbaatar, and in other provincial centers. Semi-nomadic life still predominates in the countryside, but settled agricultural communities are becoming more common. Mongolia's population growth rate is estimated at 1.6% (2020 census). About two-thirds of the total population is under age 30, 36% of whom are under 14.

Key: For population growth 1979–2008

- Salmon cells indicate that the population has declined or experienced minimal (<1%) growth.
- Light green cells indicate a growth between 1–2%.
- Dark green cells indicate a growth of greater than or equal to 2%.

Rank	Name	Mongolian	Inhabitants (1979 est.)	Inhabitants (1989 est.)	Inhabitants (2000 census)	Inhabitants (est. 2008)	Change since 1979	Growth Percentage/Year	Administrative Unit
1.	Ulaanbaatar ^{*}	Улаанбаатар	396,300	540,600	711,900	1,008,738	612,438	+5.2%	Ulaanbaatar
2.	Erdenet	Эрдэнэт	29,100	–	68,310	86,866	57,766	+6.6%	Orkhon
3.	Darkhan	Дархан	49,100	–	65,791	74,300	25,200	+1.7%	Darkhan-Uul
4.	Choibalsan	Чойбалсан	28,500	37,300	40,123	38,150	9,650	+1.1%	Dornod
5.	Mörön	Мөрөн	16,500	21,300	28,903	36,082	19,582	+4.0%	Khövsgöl
6.	Nalaikh	Налайх	–	–	23,600	29,115	5,515	+3.0%	Ulaanbaatar
7.	Khovd	Ховд	17,500	24,100	25,765	28,601	11,101	+2.1%	Khovd
8.	Ölgii	Өлгий	18,700	27,200	25,791	27,855	9,155	+1.6%	Bayan-Ölgii
9.	Bayankhongor	Баянхонгор	16,300	21,200	22,066	26,252	9,952	+2.0%	Bayankhongor
10.	Baganuur	Багануур	–	–	21,100	25,877	4,777	+1.8%	Ulaanbaatar
11.	Arvaikheer	Арвайхээр	12,300	16,900	19,058	25,622	13,322	+3.6%	Övörkhangai
12.	Ulaangom	Улаангом	17,900	22,900	25,993	21,406	3,506	+0.67%	Uvs
13.	Sükhbaatar	Сүхбаатар	14,300	19,600	22,374	19,626	5,326	+1.2%	Selenge
14.	Sainshand	Сайншанд	11,100	10,300	18,290	25,210	14,110	+4.2%	Dornogovi
15.	Dalanzadgad	Даланзадгад	10,000	14,300	14,050	16,856	6,856	+2.3%	Ömnögovi
16.	Tsetserleg	Цэцэрлэг	14,700	20,300	18,519	16,300	1,600	+0.37%	Arkhangai
17.	Uliastai	Улиастай	15,400	20,300	18,154	16,240	840	+0.17%	Zavkhan
18.	Altai	Алтай	13,700	18,800	15,741	15,800	2,100	+0.5%	Govi-Altai
19.	Züünkharaa	Зүүнхараа	11,400	–	15,000^{(2004)}	–	3,600	+1.1%	Selenge
20.	Öndörkhaan	Өндөрхаан	11,100	14,400	18,003	14,800	3,700	+1.1%	Khentii
21.	Zuunmod	Зуунмод	9,800	15,800	14,837	14,568	4,768	+1.6%	Töv
22.	Baruun-Urt	Баруун-Урт	11,600	16,100	15,133	12,994	1,394	+0.4%	Sükhbaatar
23.	Zamyn-Üüd	Замын-Үүд	–	–	5,486	11,527	6,041	+13.8%	Dornogovi
24.	Bulgan	Булган	11,300	12,800	12,681	11,198	−102	−0.03%	Bulgan
25.	Mandalgovi	Мандалговь	10,200	16,100	14,517	10,299	99	+0.03%	Dundgovi
26.	Kharkhorin	Хархорин	–	–	8,977^{(2003)}	–	–	n/a%	Övörkhangai
27.	Bor-Öndör	Бор-Өндөр	–	–	6,406^{(2001)}	8,902	2,496	+3.5%	Khentii
28.	Choir	Чойр	4,500	–	8,983	7,998	3,498	+2.6%	Govisümber
29.	Sharyngol	Шарынгол	–	–	8,902	7,798	−1,104	−2.8%	Darkhan-Uul
	Mongolia	Монгол улс	1,538,980	1,987,274	2,365,269	2,635,000	1,096,600	+2.38%	

^{*} – city proper, Nalaikh, Baganuur, Bagakhangai not included in this figure, they are separated in the table.

From List of cities in Mongolia

== Vital statistics ==
=== UN estimates ===
Period	Live births per year	Deaths per year	Natural change per year	CBR^{1}	CDR^{1}	NC^{1}	TFR^{1}	IMR^{1}
1950–1955	33 000	18 000	15 000	40.0	21.4	18.6	5.60	182.9
1955–1960	39 000	19 000	20 000	43.0	20.7	22.2	6.30	164.9
1960–1965	49 000	19 000	30 000	47.9	18.4	29.5	7.50	134.5
1965–1970	54 000	19 000	34 000	44.8	15.9	28.8	7.50	118.6
1970–1975	59 000	19 000	40 000	43.0	13.9	29.1	7.50	106.5
1975–1980	63 000	21 000	42 000	39.6	13.1	26.5	6.65	104.5
1980–1985	69 000	22 000	47 000	38.1	12.4	25.7	5.75	102.3
1985–1990	75 000	22 000	53 000	36.6	10.8	25.9	4.90	91.7
1990–1995	62 000	22 000	40 000	27.6	9.6	18.0	3.30	66.6
1995–2000	52 000	20 000	33 000	22.1	8.3	13.8	2.50	54.7
2000–2005	47 000	17 000	30 000	18.9	7.2	11.7	2.08	43.5
2005–2010	62 000	17 000	45 000	22.4	6.9	15.5	2.40	36.0
2010–2015				26.1	6.3	19.8	2.84	
2015–2020				24.4	6.3	18.1	2.90	
2020–2025				20.5	6.4	14.1	2.73	
2025–2030				18.1	6.7	11.4	2.59	
^{1} CBR = crude birth rate (per 1000); CDR = crude death rate (per 1000); NC = natural change (per 1000); TFR = total fertility rate (number of children per woman); IMR = infant mortality rate per 1000 births

=== Registered births and deaths ===
	Average population	Live births	Deaths	Natural change	Crude birth rate (per 1000)	Crude death rate (per 1000)	Natural change (per 1000)	Crude migration change (per 1000)	Total fertility rate
1934		10,622	8,991	1,631					
1935	738,200	13,700	12,083	1,617	18.6	16.4	2.2	−2.2	
1936	737,900	12,209	17,049	−4,840	16.5	23.1	−6.6	6.2	
1937	740,000	14,126	14,747	−621	19.1	19.9	−0.8	3.6	
1938	747,600	15,492	15,101	391	20.7	20.2	0.5	9.8	
1939	736,400	14,092	17,242	−3,150	19.1	23.4	−4.3	−10.7	
1940	738,600	19,046	15,906	3,140	25.8	21.5	4.3	−1.3	
1941	743,800								
1942	749,000								
1943	754,200								
1944	759,100								
1945	759,300								
1946	759,400								
1947	759,700								
1948	759,200								
1949	758,700								
1950	758,000								
1951	772,400	11,015	7,598	3,417	14.3	9.8	4.4	14.6	
1952	786,100	14,218	9,205	5,013	18.1	11.7	6.4	11.4	
1953	799,900	23,989	10,953	13,036	30.0	13.7	16.3	1.3	
1954	813,600	21,394	11,068	10,326	26.3	13.6	15.3	1.3	
1955	827,300	26,889	11,823	15,066	32.5	13.3	18.2	−1.4	
1956	845,500	26,825	10,573	16,252	31.7	12.5	19.2	2.8	
1957	862,000	32,594	9,722	22,872	37.8	11.3	26.5	−7.0	
1958	884,800	34,654	9,895	24,759	39.2	11.2	28.0	−1.5	
1959	909,600	36,624	9,345	27,279	40.3	10.3	30.0	−2.0	
1960	936,900	41,202	10,043	31,159	44.0	10.7	33.3	−3.3	
1961	968,100	40,036	10,030	30,006	41.4	10.4	31.0	2.3	
1962	998,000	42,144	10,192	31,952	42.2	10.2	32.0	−1.1	
1963	1,017,100	40,250	12,168	28,082	39.0	11.8	27.2	−8.1	
1964	1,045,200	42,001	11,215	30,786	39.6	10.6	29.0	−1.4	
1965	1,076,000	41,427	13,072	28,355	38.0	12.0	26.0	3.5	
1966	1,104,400	43,150	13,097	30,053	38.5	11.7	26.8	−0.4	
1967	1,134,400	43,650	13,563	30,087	38.0	11.8	26.2	1.0	
1968	1,164,500	46,159	13,085	33,074	38.8	11.1	27.7	−1.2	
1969	1,197,600	46,849	13,905	32,944	38.6	11.5	27.1	1.3	
1970	1,230,500	50,152	15,314	34,838	40.2	12.3	27.9	−0.4	
1971	1,265,400	49,917	13,857	36,060	38.8	10.8	28.0	0.4	
1972	1,301,400	52,796	14,727	38,069	40.0	11.4	28.8	−0.4	
1973	1,339,500	54,841	13,611	41,230	40.3	10.0	30.3	−1.0	
1974	1,380,700	56,218	12,555	43,663	40.1	9.0	31.1	−0.3	
1975	1,424,400	56,953	14,445	42,508	39.4	10.0	29.4	2.3	
1976	1,466,900	55,224	14,757	40,467	37.1	9.9	27.2	2.6	
1977	1,512,400	56,683	15,490	41,193	37.0	10.1	26.9	4.1	
1978	1,553,600	60,291	14,238	46,053	38.3	9.0	29.3	−2.1	
1979	1,595,000	60,233	15,375	44,858	37.2	9.5	27.7	−1.1	
1980	1,639,700	63,068	17,331	45,737	39.2	10.4	28.8	−0.8	6.411
1981	1,682,000	62,751	15,787	46,964	36.8	9.2	27.6	−1.8	
1982	1,724,700	64,210	16,568	47,642	36.8	9.5	27.3	−1.9	
1983	1,767,500	65,020	17,620	47,400	36.4	9.9	26.5	−1.7	
1984	1,808,900	68,129	20,359	47,770	37.2	11.1	26.1	−2.7	
1985	1,854,300	69,627	18,688	50,939	38.2	10.0	28.2	−3.1	5.476
1986	1,900,600	71,801	16,424	55,377	37.3	8.5	28.8	−3.8	
1987	1,949,700	71,437	15,930	55,507	36.2	8.1	28.1	−2.3	
1988	1,997,000	75,832	17,689	58,143	37.5	8.7	28.8	−4.5	
1989	2,043,954	73,593	17,000	56,593	35.5	8.2	27.3	−3.8	
1990	2,098,710	73,209	17,559	55,650	34.4	8.4	26.0	27.1	4.472
1991	2,165,342	70,083	18,734	51,349	32.4	8.7	23.7	−12.7	4.009
1992	2,167,790	63,258	18,288	44,970	29.2	8.4	20.8	−29.5	3.512
1993	2,165,130	47,871	17,606	30,265	22.1	8.1	14.0	−7.7	2.532
1994	2,189,395	52,962	16,546	36,416	24.2	7.6	16.6	−0.5	2.694
1995	2,224,945	54,293	16,794	37,499	24.4	7.5	16.9	−0.5	2.760
1996	2,259,507	51,806	17,550	34,256	22.9	7.8	15.1	0.7	2.506
1997	2,291,750	49,488	16,980	32,508	21.6	7.4	14.2	−0.4	2.351
1998	2,323,809	49,256	15,799	33,457	21.2	6.8	14.4	−0.3	2.304
1999	2,356,813	49,461	16,105	33,356	21.0	6.8	14.2	0.1	2.318
2000	2,388,299	48,721	15,472	33,249	20.4	6.5	13.9	−1.4	2.243
2001	2,417,751	49,685	15,999	33,686	20.6	6.6	14.0	−1.8	2.221
2002	2,449,027	46,922	15,857	31,065	19.2	6.5	12.7	1.0	2.076
2003	2,480,374	45,723	16,006	29,717	18.4	6.5	11.9	0	2.014
2004	2,508,412	45,501	16,404	29,097	18.1	6.5	11.6	−0.9	1.984
2005	2,536,407	45,326	16,480	28,846	17.9	6.5	11.4	0.2	1.968
2006	2,567,168	49,092	16,682	32,410	19.1	6.5	12.6	0	2.081
2007	2,601,850	56,636	16,259	40,377	21.7	6.2	15.5	−1.2	2.341
2008	2,643,201	63,768	15,413	48,355	24.1	5.8	18.3	−0.9	2.633
2009	2,691,115	69,167	16,911	52,256	25.7	6.3	19.4	−0.5	2.753
2010	2,738,622	63,270	18,293	44,977	23.1	6.7	16.4	0.1	2.431
2011	2,786,317	69,853	19,155	50,698	25.1	6.9	18.2	0.2	2.609
2012	2,839,705	73,839	17,761	56,078	26.0	6.3	19.7	0.2	2.741
2013	2,899,011	79,780	17,247	62,533	27.5	5.9	21.6	0.2	3.006
2014	2,963,113	82,839	16,521	66,318	28.0	5.6	22.4	0	3.120
2015	3,026,864	82,130	17,620	64,510	27.1	5.8	21.3	−0.7	3.015
2016	3,088,856	79,920	17,763	62,157	25.9	5.8	20.1	0.2	2.950
2017	3,148,917	75,321	17,357	57,964	23.9	5.5	18.4	0.2	2.790
2018	3,208,189	78,444	17,864	60,580	24.5	5.6	18.9	0.2	2.920
2019	3,267,673	79,580	18,403	61,177	24.4	5.6	18.8	−0.8	2.986
2020	3,332,062	77,716	17,040	60,676	23.4	4.8	18.6	0	2.936
2021	3,393,455	73,253	20,856	52,397	21.6	5.8	15.8	−0.2	2.947
2022	3,443,458	66,910	19,301	47,609	19.4	5.4	14.0	−0.2	2.710
2023	3,490,859	66,234	19,041	47,193	19.0	5.3	13.7	−0.4	2.705
2024	3,534,503	59,644	19,550	40,094	16.9	5.5	11.4	−0.5	2.478
2025	3,572,835	56,222	19,134	37,088	15.7	5.3	10.4		2.32
2026	3,600,000(e)	54,000(e)	19,450(e)	34,550	15.0	5.4	9.6		2.22(e)

==== Current vital statistics ====
Period	Live births	Deaths	Natural increase
January–October 2025	45,298	14,735	+30,563
January–October 2026	43,455	15,012	+28,443
Difference	▼ –1,843 (-4.1%)	▲ +277 (+1.9%)	▼ –2,120

View source data.
View source data.
View source data.

=== Fertility ===
Years	1925	1926	1927	1928	1929	1930	1931	1932	1933	1934
Total Fertility Rate in Mongolia	5.94	5.92	5.90	5.89	5.87	5.85	5.83	5.82	5.80	5.78

Years	1935	1936	1937	1938	1939	1940	1941	1942	1943	1944
Total Fertility Rate in Mongolia	5.76	5.75	5.73	5.71	5.69	5.67	5.66	5.64	5.62	5.60

Years	1945	1946	1947	1948	1949
Total Fertility Rate in Mongolia	5.59	5.57	5.55	5.53	5.51

=== Life expectancy ===
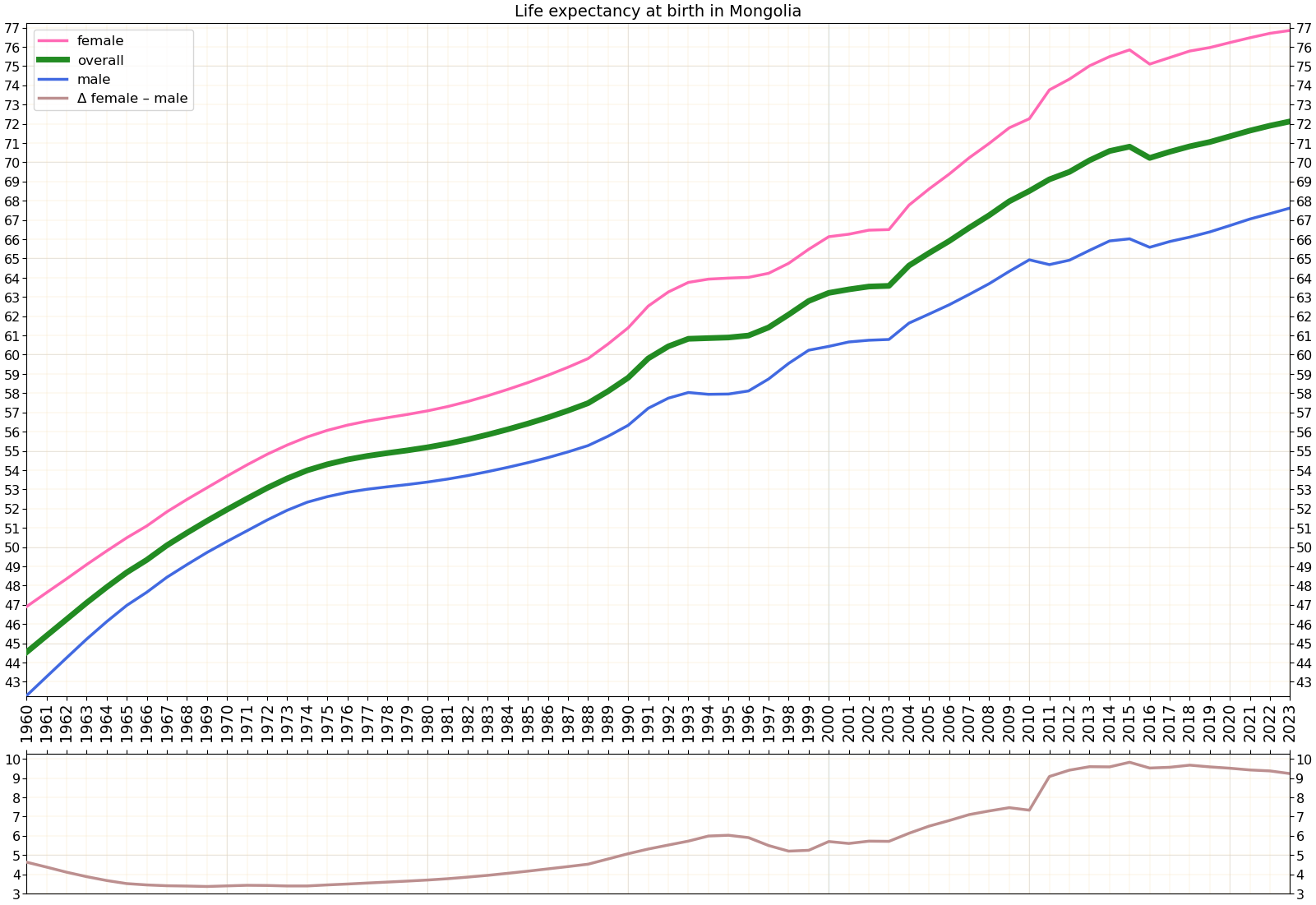
Life expectancy at birth in Mongolia

Period	Life expectancy in Years	Period	Life expectancy in Years
1950–1955	43.2	1985–1990	59.6
1955–1960	46.1	1990–1995	60.8
1960–1965	50.7	1995–2000	61.8
1965–1970	53.9	2000–2005	64.1
1970–1975	56.4	2005–2010	66.1
1975–1980	56.9	2010–2015	68.5
1980–1985	57.3		

Source: UN World Population Prospects

== Ethnicity and languages ==
The demonym for the people of Mongolia is Mongolian. The name Mongol usually accounts for people of the Mongol ethnic group, thus excluding Turkic groups such as Kazakhs and Tuvans.

Ethnic Mongols account for about 96% of the population and consist of Khalkh and other subgroups, all distinguished primarily by dialects of the Mongolian language. The Khalkhs make up 86% of the ethnic Mongol population. The remaining 14% include Oirats, Buryats and others. Ethnic distinctions among the Mongol subgroups are relatively minor. Language or tribal differences are not a political or social issue.

Turkic speaking Kazakhs form the largest ethnic minority and constitute c. 3.9% of Mongolia's population. Khotons and Chantuu are Mongolized people with Turkic origin and speak Mongolian.

In around 1860, part of the Middle jüz Kazakhs who sought refuge from the Qing Empire massacres in Xinjiang came to Mongolia and were allowed to settle down in Bayan-Ölgii Province. There are smaller numbers of Russian, Chinese, Korean and American people working in Mongolia since 1990. 3,000 Westerners live in Mongolia, accounting for 0.1% of its total population.

English is the most widely used foreign language followed by Russian. Lately, Mandarin Chinese, Japanese, Korean and German are gaining popularity.

=== Ethnicity ===
According to 2020 census, 95.6% of the population of Mongolia is composed of ethnic Mongols while Kazakhs are the largest minority with 3.8%. Khalkha is the dominant subgroup of ethnic Mongols and its share in the population increased over the years.

Ethnic Groups in Mongolia
Ethnic Group	Ethno-linguistic Family	census 1956		census 1963		census 1969		census 1979		census 1989		census 2000		census 2010		census 2020	
Ethnic Group	Ethno-linguistic Family	#	%	#	%	#	%	#	%	#	%	#	%	#	%	#	%
Khalkha	Mongolic	639,141	75.59	775,376	76.23	911,079	76.67	1,235,806	80.30	1,610,424	81.04	1,934,674	81.80	2,168,141	78.71	2,659,985	83.79
Kazakh	Turkic	36,729	4.34	47,735	4.69	62,812	5.29	84,305	5.48	120,506	6.06	102,983	4.35	101,526	3.69	120,999	3.81
Dörbet	Mongolic	25,667	3.04	31,339	3.08	34,725	2.92	45,053	2.93	55,208	2.78	66,706	2.82	72,403	2.63	83,719	2.64
Bayid	Mongolic	15,874	1.88	19,891	1.96	25,479	2.14	31,053	2.02	39,233	1.97	50,824	2.15	56,573	2.05	63,775	2.01
Buryat	Mongolic	24,625	2.91	28,523	2.80	29,772	2.51	29,802	1.94	35,444	1.78	40,620	1.72	45,087	1.64	43,661	1.38
Zakhchin	Mongolic	15,772	1.87	14,399	1.42	15,662	1.32	18,957	1.23	23,478	1.18	25,183	1.06	32,845	1.19	37,407	1.18
Dariganga	Mongolic	16,852	1.99	18,587	1.83	20,603	1.73	24,564	1.60	29,040	1.46	31,909	1.35	27,412	1.00	36,419	1.15
Altai Uriankhai	Mongolic	10,833	1.28	13,140	1.29	15,057	1.27	19,475	1.27	22,998	1.16	29,766	1.26	26,654	0.97	29,021	0.91
Darkhad	Mongolic	10,833	1.28	8,826	0.87	10,174	0.86	10,716	0.70	14,757	0.74	19,019	0.80	21,558	0.78	24,549	0.77
Torguud	Mongolic	4,729	0.56	6,028	0.59	7,119	0.60	8,617	0.56	10,050	0.51	12,628	0.53	14,176	0.51	15,596	0.49
Uuld	Mongolic													15,520	0.56	14,666	0.46
Khotons	Turkic/Mongolic	2,603	0.31	2,874	0.28	4,056	0.34	4,380	0.28	6,076	0.31	9,014	0.38	11,304	0.41	12,057	0.38
Khotogoid	Mongolic	...		...		...		...		...		7,237	0.31	15,460	0.56	8,583	0.27
Myangad	Mongolic	2,518	0.30	2,712	0.27	3,222	0.27	4,173	0.27	4,760	0.24	6,028	0.25	6,592	0.24	8,125	0.26
Barga	Mongolic	2,458	0.29	2,343	0.23	2,305	0.19	1,999	0.13	2,130	0.11	2,506	0.11	2,989	0.11	2,832	0.09
Tuvan	Turkic	...		...		...		...		...		4,778	0.20	5,169	0.19	2,354	0.07
Üzemchin	Mongolic	2,046	0.24	2,070	0.20	2,127	0.18	2,030	0.13	2,086	0.10	2,386	0.10	2,577	0.09	2,308	0.07
Sartuul	Mongolic	...		...		...		...		...		1,540	0.07	1,286	0.05	2,023	0.06
Eljigin	Mongolic	...		...		...		...		...		151	0.01	1,340	0.05	1,034	0.03
Hamnigan of Tungusic origin	Mongolic	...		...		...		...		...		565	0.02	537	0.02	384	0.01
Khoshut	Mongolic															382	0.01
Tsaatan	Turkic	...		...		...		...		...		303	0.01	282	0.01	208	0.01
Chantuu	Turkic	...		...		...		...		...		380	0.02	260	0.01	202	0.01
Kharchin	Mongolic	...		...		...		...		...		266	0.01	152	0.01	154	0.00
Chahar	Mongolic	...		...		...		...		...		123	0.01	132	0.00	...	
(Huuchid) (Note: Not listed in the Censuses)	Mongolic	...		...		...		...		...		...		...		...	
(Baarin)	Mongolic	...		...		...		...		...		...		...		...	
(Khorchin)	Mongolic	...		...		...		...		...		...		...		...	
(Tümed)	Mongolic	...		...		...		...		...		...		...		...	
Russian nationals		13,444	0.16	8,905	0.88	1,433	0.12	196	0.01	140	0.01	2,020	0.09	2,474	0.09		
Chinese nationals		16,157	0.19	21,981	2.16	725	0.06	344	0.02	247	0.1	3,374	0.14	8,688	0.32		
Korean nationals		...		...		...		...		...		338	0.01	1,522	0.06		
American nationals		...		...		...		...		...		303	0.01	656	0.02		
Others		11,125	0.13	6,819	0.67	35,045	2.95	8,653	0.56	1,509	0.08	...		...		4,122	0.13
Mongolia		845,481	100	1,017,162	100	1,188,271	100	1,538,980	100	1,987,274	100	2,365,269	100	2,754,685	100	3,174,565	100

== Religions ==
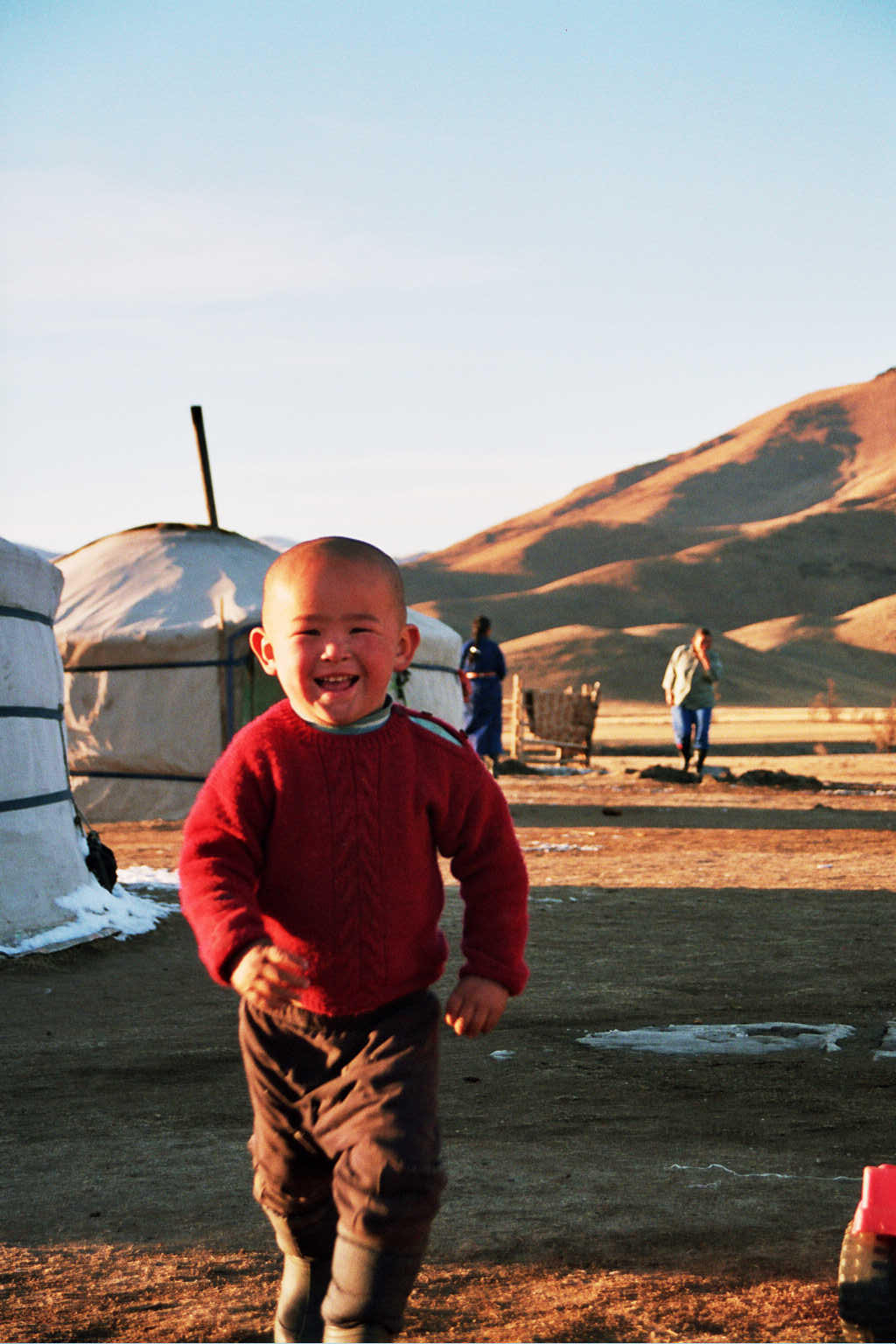
A young Mongolian boy

Various forms of Shamanism have been widely practiced throughout the history of what is now Mongolia, as such beliefs were common among nomadic people in Asian history. Such beliefs gradually gave way to Tibetan Buddhism, but shamanism has left a mark on Mongolian religious culture, and continues to be practiced.

Traditionally, Tibetan Buddhism was the predominant religion. However, it was suppressed under the communist regime until 1990, with only one showcase monastery allowed to remain. Since 1990, as liberalization began, Buddhism has encountered a resurgence.

Religions in Mongolia (population aged 15 and above)
Year	Buddhism		Islam		Shamanism		Christianity		Other religions		Atheism		Year
Year	Pop.	%	Pop.	%	Pop.	%	Pop.	%	Pop.	%	Pop.	%	Year
2010	909,357	53%	190,702	3.0%	155,174	2.9%	41,117	2.1%	6,933	0.4%	835,283	40%	3,000,000
2020	—N/a	51.7%	—N/a	3.2%	—N/a	2.5%	—N/a	1.3%	—N/a	0.7%	—N/a	40.6%	—N/a

== Base demographic indicators for Mongolia ==
Base Demographic Indicators for Mongolia
Demography indicator	units	U.S. Census Bureau International Data Base 1 July 2007	United Nations World Population Prospects: The 2007 Revision 1 July 2007	United Nations Economic and Social Commission for Asia and Pacific(ESCAP) 1 July 2006	National Statistical Office of Mongolia 31 December 2007
Age structure: 0–14 years:	% of total population	28.72%	27%	28%	28.58%
Age structure: 15–59 years:	% of total population	65.56%	67%	—N/a	65.36%
Age structure: 60 years and over:	% of total population	5.72%	6%	—N/a	6.06%
Sex ratio: at birth:	male(s)/female	1.0500	1.01	1.0424	1.0310
Sex ratio: under 15 years:	male(s)/female	1.0408	—N/a	1.0153	1.0193
Sex ratio: 15–59 years:	male(s)/female	1.0003	—N/a	0.9414	0.9379
Sex ratio: 60 years and over:	male(s)/female	0.8169	0.80	—N/a	0.7933
Sex ratio: total population:	male(s)/female	1.0002	0.9947	—N/a	0.9508
Potential support ratio:	persons aged 15 to 64 per persons aged 65 or older	17.47	17	—N/a	16.33
Infant mortality rate:	deaths/1,000 live births	42.65	40	39 ^{(2005)}	15.4
Mortality under age 5:	deaths/1,000	—N/a	55	49 ^{(2005)}	22
Life expectancy at birth total population:	years	66.99	68	65.1 ^{(2000–2005)}	66.54
Life expectancy at birth male:	years	64.61	64	61.9 ^{(2000–2005)}	63.13
Life expectancy at birth female:	years	69.48	70	68.4 ^{(2000–2005)}	70.23
Age specific fertility rate:	ages 15–19 (per 1,000)	22.5	45	49.7 ^{(2000–2005)}	18.7
Urban population:	% of total population	—N/a	57%	56.8%	60.75%
Contraceptive prevalence rate all methods:	% of women aged 15 to 49 who are married or in union	—N/a	67.4%	—N/a	—N/a
Contraceptive prevalence rate modern methods:	% of women aged 15 to 49 who are married or in union	—N/a	54.3%	—N/a	—N/a
Human development index:	% of total population	—N/a	0.691%	—N/a	0.720%
Population projected to 2025:	person	3,725,352	3,112,000	—N/a	—N/a
Population projected to 2050:	person	4,340,496	3,388,000	—N/a	—N/a

== See also ==
- Mongolian nationality law
- Ethnic groups in East Asia
- Buddhism in East Asia
- Mongolia Human Development Report 1997, UNDP Mongolia Communications Office, Ulaanbaatar, Mongolia 1997
