= Züünbayan, Sainshand =

Bag of Sainshand, Dornogovi, Mongolia

Coordinates: 44°29′18″N 110°02′24″E

Züünbayan (Mongolian: Зүүнбаян, ᠵᠡᠭᠦᠨᠪᠠᠶᠠᠨ), also Zuun-Bayan, Zun-Bayan, Dzun-Bayan is a bag in Sainshand sum (district) of Dornogovi Province, Mongolia. This settlement is officially the 5th bag (commune) of the Dornogovi Province capital Sainshand, which sum territory was expanded for about 50 km south to the Gobi Desert to include Züünbayan. Züünbayan population was 1,917 (end of 2006, est.) and 1,606 at the end of 2008.

== Location ==
Züünbayan is 46 km South from Sainshand city center. The Erdene sum center is 67 km E from Züünbayan, Ulaanbadrakh sum center is 88 km SE, Khövsgöl sum center is 116 km S, Saikhandulaan sum center is 70 km W.

== History ==
Züünbayan oilfield in East Gobi was discovered by Mongolian geologist J. Dugersuren and Soviet geologist Yu.S.Zhelubovsky in 1940. In 1947, "Mongolnefti" (Mongolian: Монголнефть) trust was established and an oil refinery with a processing capacity of about 400,000 barrels (64,000 m^{3}) per year was built in Züünbayan in 1950. Between 1950 and 1969, over 4 million barrels (640,000 m^{3}) of oil were produced from the Züünbayan oilfield and a total of 7 million barrels (1,100,000 m^{3}) of oil (including lighter oil imported from Russia to be mixed with Züünbayan oil) were processed at the refinery, which supplied more than 20% of the country's fuel and lubricants demand at that period. However, due to several factors such as well pressure decrease, the fire accident that destroyed the refinery, and discoveries of giant oil fields in western Siberia, Russia, petroleum operations in Mongolia was ceased in 1969.

== Transportation ==
The 62 km long railway connects Züünbayan to the Sainshand railway station on the Trans-Mongolian Railway. The airstrip is 14 km E from Züünbayan. Tavan Tolgoi coking coal mine railway to this station is under construction post-covid disruption, with a goal of displacing heavy truck traffic and labor.
