= Altanshiree =

District in Dornogovi Province, Mongolia

Altanshiree Атланширээ Сум ᠠᠯᠲᠠᠨᠰᠢᠷᠡᠭᠡᠰᠤᠮᠤ
- District
- Location within Mongolia
- Coordinates: 45°32′26″N 110°28′03″E
- Country: Mongolia
- Province: Dornogovi

Area
  - Total: 7,200 km^{2} (2,800 sq mi)

Population (2024)
  - Total: 1,362

Altanshiree (Mongolian: Алтанширээ) is a sum (district) of Dornogovi Province in southeastern Mongolia. It covers an area of approximately 7,200 km^{2} (2,800 sq mi) and had a population of 1,362 in 2024. The Mongol Oil Refinery, Mongolia's first oil refinery, is located in the district.

== Geography ==
Altanshiree is one of the fourteen sums (district) in the Dornogovi Province. It was established in 1934. The district is spread across 7,200 km^{2} (2,800 sq mi) of land area. It is located 450 km (280 mi) from the national capital of Ulaanbaatar and 84 km (52 mi) northeast of the provincial capital of Sainshand. It is bordered by the districts of Sainshand and Saikhandulaan to the south-west, Airag to the west, Ikhkhet and Galshar to the north, and Delgerekh and Örgön to the east and south-east. The district is divided into four bags–Toig, Zaraa, Khayaa and Chuluun gishger. Several fossils have been found in the Shariin-Gol formation in the district.

== Demographics ==
Altanshiree is the second least populated district in the province. As of 2024, the district had a population of 1,362 which included 892 males and 600 females. The population increased from 1,301 individuals recorded in 2010.

== Economy ==
Majority of the population (73%) in the district are involved in animal husbandry. In 2019, out of the 462 households in the district, there were 290 herder households and 337 families owned livestock. As per the 2025 livestock census, the district had 65,939 livestock including 31,467 goats, 26,888 sheep, 3,583 horses, 845 camels, and3,156 other cattle. There are 22 industries in the district.

In 2018, the construction of Mongol Oil Refinery, Mongolia's first oil refinery, began in the district. Financed through a loan from the Government of India, the refinery is designed to process 1.5 million tonnes of crude oil annually. The Toson-Uul and Tamsag oil fields in eastern Mongolia are connected to the refinery by a planned 527 km (327 mi) pipeline.

== Infrastructure ==
The district has a school which had 139 students in 2019 with a gross enrolment ratio of 77.9%, and a kindergarden with 98 students. There is a primary health center with seven bed. A 27 km (17 mi) railway line is planned to connect the oil refinery with Sainshand.
