= Khajuu-Ulaan =

Human settlement in Ikhkhet, Dornogovi, Mongolia

Coordinates: 46°19′53″N 109°52′44″E

Khajuu-Ulaan (Mongolian: Хажуу-Улаан, also Hadju-Ulan, Hadzhu-Ulan) is urban-type settlement in Ikhkhet sum (district) of Dornogovi Province, Mongolia. Khajuu-Ulaan is located 53 km SE from Darkhan sum center and 43 km NE of Bor-Öndör city of Khentii Province, 26 km NW from the Ikhkhet sum center and 79 km NE from Airag sum center of Dornogovi Province.

In Khajuu-Ulaan is the fluorspar open pit mine, fluorspar is transported to the Bor-Öndör processing plant.
