= Bor-Öndör =

City in Khentii, Mongolia

Coordinates: 46°15′21″N 109°25′30″E

Mongolian name
- Mongolian Cyrillic: Бор-Өндөр
- Mongolian script: ᠪᠣᠷᠣ ᠥᠨᠳᠥᠷ
Transcriptions
- SASM/GNC: Bor-Öndör

Location of Bor-Öndör in Mongolia

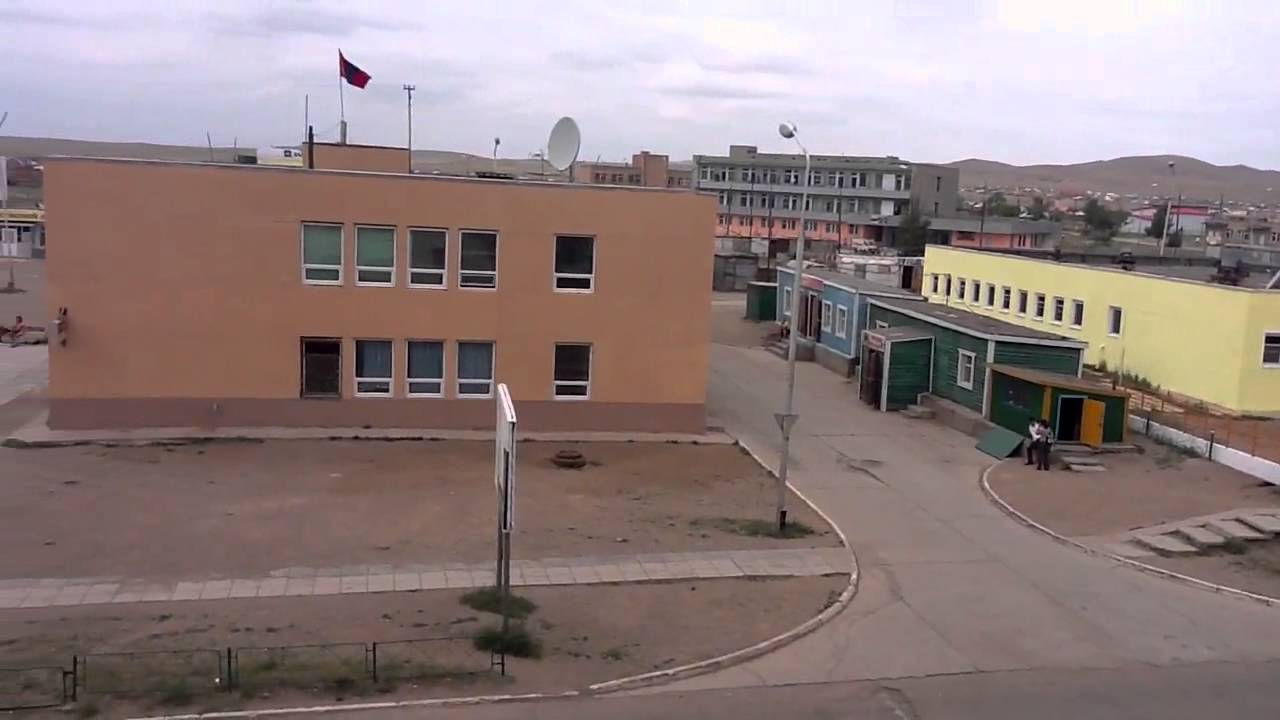
Bor-Öndör

Bor-Öndör (Mongolian: Бор-Өндөр) is a city in Khentii Province in eastern Mongolia.

== Geography ==
The City is at an elevation of 1300 meters and located close to the northern semi-desert edge of the Gobi Desert. Its administrated area is 144 km^{2}.

== Population ==
The population was 6,406 in 2001, and had grown to 8,510 by 2006, in more recent data from 2010, the city's population fell to 8,080 Bor-Öndör is the second most populous city in Khentii Province after the capital Öndörkhaan.

== Administrative divisions ==
The district is divided into six bags, which are:

- Bor-Undur
- Bumbat
- Kholboo
- Khuikh
- Ulgii
- Uurkhaichin

== Economy ==
The city's economy is dominated by Fluorspar mining and fluorspar concentrate production. The underground mine, open pit and mineral processing plant, which is the only mineral processing plant in the country, are operated by the Mongolrostsvetmet JV company. All fluorspar products are exported to Russia, Ukraine, and other countries by rail.

In 2007 there were 39,218 heads of livestock in Bor-Öndör. However, they do not have enough pasture land due to mining.

== History ==
Fluorspar deposits were surveyed by Soviet geologists in the 1950s. In 1973, the Soviet-Mongolian (currently Russian-Mongolian) company was created, with 49% of shares held by the Soviet (now Russian) government and 51% by the Mongolian government. The mine, open pit mine, mineral processing plant and worker's housing were built by the Soviets. All production during that time was exported to the Soviet Union.

== Transportation ==
Bor-Öndör has a railway connection to the Ulan-Ude - Ulaanbaatar - Beijing line (Trans-Mongolian Railway).

Unpaved roads connect Bor-Öndör with Darkhan sum centre (43 km) of Khentii Province and with the Khentii Province capital Chinggis City (144 km) via Darkhan. Unpaved roads also connect with the Khajuu-Ulaan mining settlement (43 km) and Ikhkhet (65 km), Airag (65 km), Dalanjargalan (59 km) sums of Dornogovi Province. Via Airag is connection with paved road Ulaanbaatar (360 km) - Choir (165 km) - Sainshand (187 km) - Zamyn-Üüd (277 km), and onward to Beijing. However, in 2025, city is connected by paved road to Dalanjargalan and new construction of paved road to Khentii's capital Chinggis City is under construction.
