= Delgerekh =

District in Dornogovi Province, Mongolia

Delgerekh Дэлгэрэх сум ᠳᠡᠯᠭᠡᠷᠡᠬᠦᠰᠤᠮᠤ
- District
- Location within Mongolia
- Coordinates: 45°48′10″N 111°12′48″E
- Country: Mongolia
- Province: Dornogovi

Area
  - Total: 4,858.1 km^{2} (1,875.7 sq mi)

Population (2025)
  - Total: 1,908

Delgerekh (Mongolian: Дэлгэрэх) is a sum (district) of Dornogovi Province in southeastern Mongolia. It covers an area of approximately 4,858.1 km^{2} (1,875.7 sq mi) and had a population of 1,908 in 2025.

== History ==
Delgerekh is one of the fourteen sums (district) in the Dornogovi Province. Delgerekh District was first established in 1913. It later became Avarga-Uulin Delgereh in 1915 and Delgereh-Avarga Mountain District in 1918. In 1924, it was reorganized as Delgereh Ogam and became part of Bogd Khan Uul Province. It was established in the current form and was transferred to the newly established Dornogovi Province based on a resolution passed by the Little Khural on 7 February 1931.

== Geography ==
The district is spread across 4,858.1 km^{2} (1,875.7 sq mi) of land area. It is located 448 km (278 mi) from the national capital of Ulaanbaatar and 137 km (85 mi) from the provincial capital Sainshand. It is bordered by the districts of Galshar to the north, Tüvshinshiree to the east, Bayandelger to the southeast, Örgön to the south, and Altanshiree to the west. It is located at an average altitude of 1,000 m (3,300 ft) and the terrain largely consists of rocky plains. The district is divided into four bags–Aman shand, Bumbat, Khongor, and Tsagaankhand.

=== Climate ===
The district experiences a continental climate, with cold winters and cool summers. The average annual temperature varies from 25 °C (77 °F) in July to −23 °C (−9 °F) in January. The temperature drops below −30 °C (−22 °F) during the winter. The district receives an average annual rainfall of 17–18 cm (6.7–7.1 in).

== Demographics ==
As of 2025, the district had a population of 1,908 which included 993 males and 915 females. The population increased from 1,769 individuals recorded in 2010.

The economy is mainly based on animal husbandry. As per the 2025 livestock census, the district had 103,409 livestock including 46,412 goats, 41,380 sheep, 8,218 horses, 1,158 camels, and 6,241 other cattle.
