= Dornod–Sainshand Oil Pipeline =

Crude oil pipeline in Mongolia

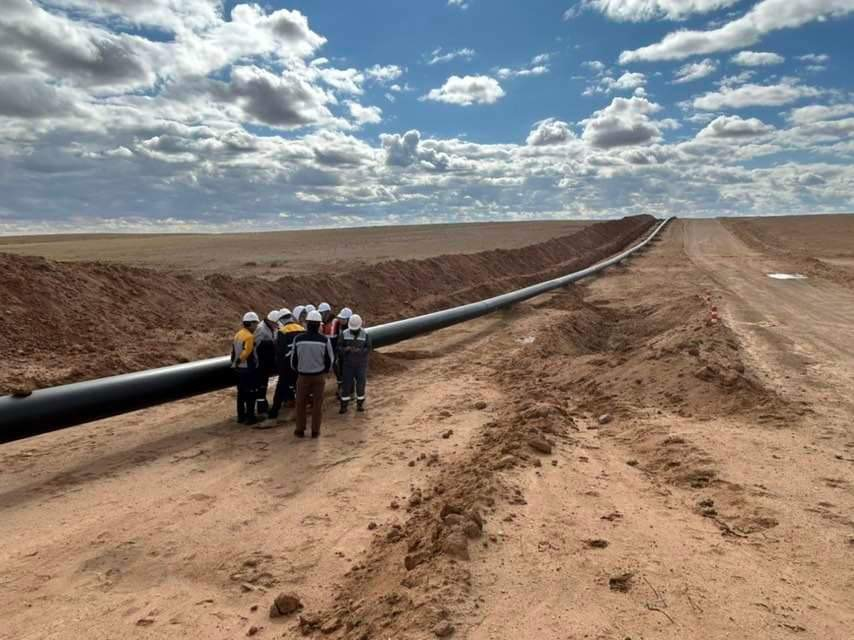

Location
- Country: Mongolia
- To: Mongol Refinery

General information
- Type: crude oil pipeline
- Contractors: Norinco International Cooperation Co. Ltd.
- Construction started: 28 April 2023
- Expected: 2027

Technical information
- Length: 530 km (330 mi)

The Dornod–Sainshand Oil Pipeline is a crude oil pipeline under construction in Mongolia, in collaboration with Chinese, and Russian government entities. Construction begun in April 2022 and was expected to be completed by 2025, but it is still continuing. It plans to transport crude oil from the Dornod oil field in eastern Mongolia, to the Sainshand refinery in the southeastern part of the country. This is one of Mongolia's key projects to strengthen its infrastructure, and position in the global economic oil trade.

== History ==
Mongolia has had a historic dependence on imported oil from neighbouring countries such as Russia. Despite having substantial oil reserves, the lack of infrastructure and refining capacity has forced Mongolia into a position of exporting raw resources, and importing refined products. The construction of the pipeline agreement, which was signed in April of 2022, has been a significant step towards Mongolia's energy independence.

== Petroleum industry in Mongolia ==
Mongolia's petroleum industry first gained pace in the early 20th century, following the Soviet collapse. Since Mongolia's first exploration activities in the 1990s, Mongolia has produced over 70 million barrels of oil, partnering with numerous international entities under production-sharing contracts. The Dornod-Sainshand oil pipeline itself, was developed under funding from China and Russia, in collaboration with Norinco International Cooperation Co. Ltd. from China, and Russian energy developer Gazprom, which plans to capitalize on the Dornod-Sainshand pipeline to supply over 50 billion cubic metres of gas, per year, to China by the year 2030. Supported by a soft loan from the Government of India, as part of the broader goal to achieve energy independence and reduce Mongolia's reliance on foreign oil, the start of the pipeline construction was launched at a ceremony held on 28 April 2023, with expectations of completion by the third quarter of 2025.

== Route and technical specifications ==
The pipeline spans over a length of 530 km, passing through desserts, and mountainous regions; as well as populated communities over nine districts, in three unique provinces. It connects the oil wells in Matad District, Dornod Province to Mongol Refinery in Altanshiree District, Dornogovi Province. The pipeline will be constructed underground.

== See also ==
- Energy in Mongolia
