= Gobi Solar Power Plant =

Photovoltaic power plant in Sainshand, Dornogovi, Mongolia

- Official name: Говь Нарны Цахилгаан Станц
- Country: Mongolia
- Location: Sainshand, Dornogovi
- Coordinates: 44°54′37.5″N 110°11′52.2″E
- Status: Operational
- Commission date: February 2019
- Construction cost: US$47.5 million

Power generation
- Nameplate capacity: 30 MW
- Annual net output: 57 GWh

The Bukhug Solar Power Plant (Mongolian: Говь Нарны Цахилгаан Станц) is a photovoltaic power station in Sainshand, Dornogovi Province, Mongolia.

== History ==
The environmental impact assessment before the construction of the power plant was carried out in 2013. Construction of the power plant started in 2018. The power plant was commissioned in February 2019.

== Technical specifications ==
The power plant has a total generation capacity of 30 MW. It generates 57 GWh of electricity annually.

== Finance ==
The power plant was constructed with a cost of US$47.5 million. About US$31.6 million of it was lend by the European Bank for Reconstruction and Development.

== See also ==
- List of power stations in Mongolia
