= Danzanravjaa Museum =

Museum in Sainshand, Dornogovi, Mongolia

- Данзанравжаагийн музей
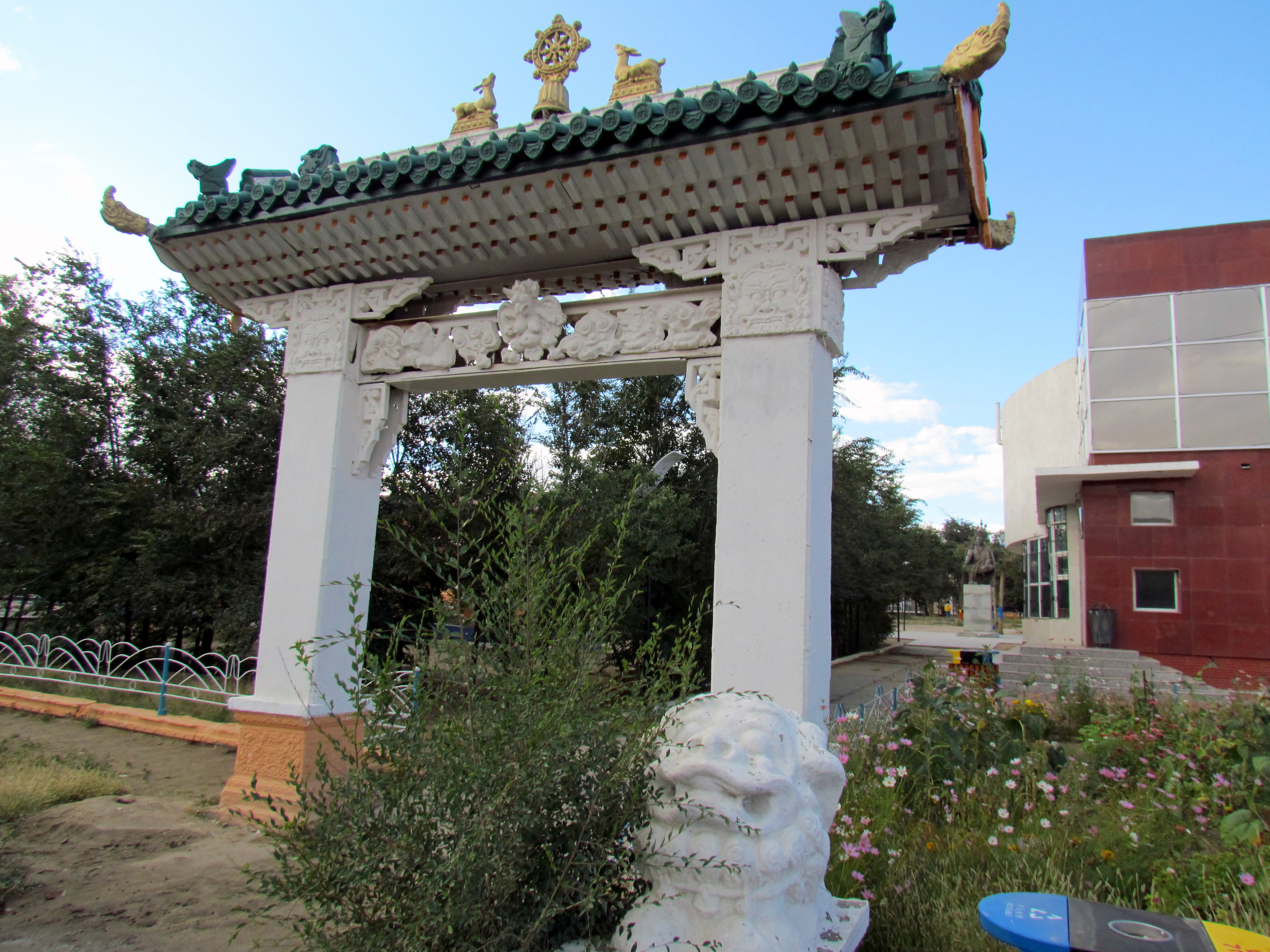
- Established: 10 July 1991; 35 years ago
- Location: Sainshand, Mongolia
- Coordinates: 44.892794°N 110.139355°E
- Type: Cultural museum
- Website: https://web.archive.org/web/20160812100327/http://ravjaamuseum.mn/mn.html

The Danzanravjaa Museum (Mongolian: Данзанравжаагийн музей) is a museum located in Sainshand, Dornogovi Province, Mongolia. The museum is dedicated to exhibiting various Mongolian cultural artifacts.

== History ==
The museum first opened in 1991, Altangerel Zundui displayed 64 artifacts including historical chests, books and scriptures to the public in the museum. Later, the Government of Mongolia passed a resolution in which the museum objects were registered as unique historical treasures of Mongolia. The museum contains more than 2000 exhibits, the value of which is about 17 billion Mongolian tögrög according to the National Census. The museum preserves Buddhist artifacts that survived the period of the Mongolian People's Republic. Lama Tuduv, curator of these artifacts, hid them in various craters in the desert. Two months later, soldiers were sent to destroy Lama Tuduv's monastery. The Lama grandson in 1991 began to excavate the artifacts hidden in the desert, these artifacts were well preserved due to the conditions of the desert terrain, most of these artifacts were exhibited in the museum. In 2019, United States Ambassador to Mongolia, Michael S. Klecheski visited the museum.

The museum has: manuscripts and traditional clothing; paintings and religious statues made of brass and gold; about 800 scriptures, more than 400 poems and a volume of philosophy; religious costumes and tsam masks; and exhibits with swords and weapons, as well as 10 books of plays.

== See also ==
- List of museums in Mongolia
