= Zülegt =

Bag in Ikhkhet, Dornogovi, Mongolia

Coordinates: 46°22′34″N 110°05′57″E

Zülegt (Mongolian: Зүлэгт Lawn, also Zulegt, Dzulegt) is a bag in Ikhkhet District, Dornogovi Province, Mongolia. Zülegt is the Ikhkhet sum centre.

In Zülegt is the fluorspar open pit mine.
