= Saikhandulaan =

District in Dornogovi Province, Mongolia

Saikhandulaan District Сайхандулаан сум ᠰᠠᠶᠢᠬᠠᠨᠳᠤᠯᠠᠭᠠᠨᠰᠤᠮᠤ
- District
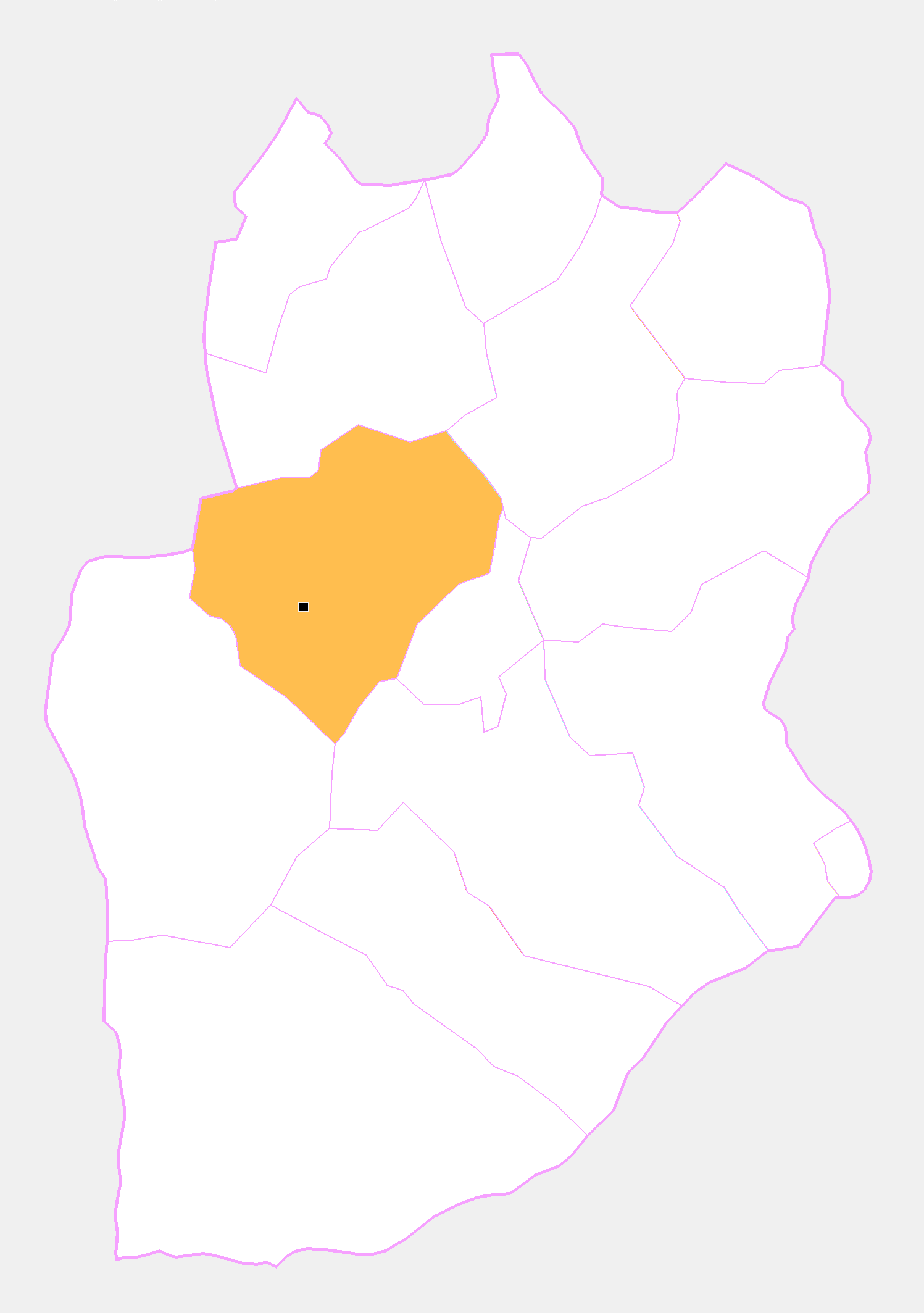
- Saikhandulaan District in Dornogovi Province
- Coordinates: 44°41′41″N 109°01′23″E
- Country: Mongolia
- Province: Dornogovi

Area
  - Total: 9,558 km^{2} (3,690 sq mi)

Population (2025)
  - Total: 1,513
- Time zone: UTC+8 (UTC + 8)

Saikhandulaan (Mongolian: Сайхандулаан, Nice warmth) is a sum (district) of Dornogovi Province in south eastern Mongolia. It covers an area of approximately 9,558 km^{2} (3,690 sq mi) and had a population of 1,513 in 2025. Located in the Gobi desert, the district experiences a dry and extreme climate. The economy is mainly based on animal husbandry with majority of the population involved in herding.

== History ==
Saikhandulaan is one of the fourteen sums (district) in the Dornogovi Province in south eastern Mongolia. It was established as Saikhan district in 1924. It became part of the Dornogovi Province when it was established in 1931. The name Saikhandulaan is a combination of the original name of Saikhan and the Ikh Dulaan Mountains.

== Geography ==
Spread across 9,558 km^{2} (3,690 sq mi) of land area, it is located 420 km (260 mi) from the national capital of Ulaanbaatar and 80 km (50 mi) from the provincial capital Sainshand. It is bordered by Airag, Altanshiree, Mandakh, Örgön, and Sainshand districts. The terrain consists of rocky plains with smaller mounds, with the highest point at 2,122 m (6,962 ft). In the northern part of the district, there are 33 unique natural formations covered with white rocks. The Khar Khutul palentological site is located in the district. The district is divided into four bags–Jargalant, Tsokhio, Ulaan shoroot, and Ulziit. Ulziit is the administrative center of the district.

=== Climate and biodiversity ===
Due to its location in the Gobi desert, the district experiences an extreme dry climate, with cold winters and cool summers. The average annual temperature varies from 35 °C (95 °F) in July to −28 °C (−18 °F) in January. Dust storms are common with winds reaching speeds of up to 18 to 28 m/s (59 to 92 ft/s) during the autmun season. The district receives very little rainfall with the average annual precipition ranging between 14–16 mm (0.55–0.63 in). Open water wells and springs formed during the rains are the major sources of drinking water for people and cattle.

Despite its harsh climate, the district supports several wildlife including Mongolian wild ass, Siberian ibex, argali, black-tailed gazelle, Eurasian wolf, apart from foxes, lynxes, sables, hares, and badgers. The vegetation largely consists of sedge grasses.

== Demographics and economy ==
As of 2025, Saikhandulaan district had a population of 1,513 which included 873 males and 640 females. The population increased from 1,769 individuals recorded in 2010.

The economy is mainly based on animal husbandry and majority of the population (76%) are involved in herding. In 2019, out of the 460 households in the district, there were 280 herder households and 338 families owned livestock. As per the 2025 livestock census, the district had 160,686 livestock including 73,513 goats, 61,954 sheep, 11,702 horses, 6,693 camels, and 6,824 other cattle. There are 19 registered industries in the district. The district has a school which had 147 students in 2019 with a gross enrolment ratio of 57.2%.
