= Central Library of Dornogovi Province =

Public library in Choibalsan, Dornogovi, Mongolia

- Дорноговь Aймгийн Tөв Hомын Cан
- 44°53′32″N 110°08′15″E
- Location: Sainshand, Dornogovi, Mongolia
- Type: public library
- Established: 28 February 1945

The Central Library of Dornod Province (Mongolian: Дорноговь Aймгийн Tөв Hомын Cан) is a public library in Sainshand, Dornogovi Province, Mongolia.

== History ==
The library was established on 28 February 1945 by the order of the Ministry of Culture.

== See also ==
- National Library of Mongolia
