= Ikh Nartiin Chuluu Nature Reserve =

Nature reserve in Dornogovi, Mongolia

- Location within Mongolia
- Location: Dalanjargalan and Airag, Mongolia
- Coordinates: 45°34′N 108°38′E

The Ikh Nartiin Chuluu Nature Reserve, commonly shortened to Ikh Nart Nature Reserve is a protected area in Dornogovi Province, Mongolia. It occupies part of two counties, Dalanjargalan and Airag. The nature reserve has an area of about 66,000 hectares (160,000 acres) and was established in 1996. It consists of rocky outcrops surrounded by dry grassland and semi-desert steppe and is one of the places in which the rare argali wild sheep can be found.

== The reserve ==
The reserve lies about 300 km (190 mi) southeast of Ulaanbaatar. It features a region of rocky outcrops in a predominantly arid steppe area. Between the rocks there are clefts and ravines, and many abandoned mines, and there are springs and ponds in the Ikh Nart Valley. Willows and elms grow in sheltered positions and the area provides shelter for livestock in winter.

== Flora ==
There are more than two hundred species of plant in the reserve. Grasslands, shrubby areas, valleys and rocky outcrops are among the habitat types found in the locality, and the balance of the plant species depends much on whether it is a wet year or a dry one. In a wet season Allium species tend to predominate, along with fringed sagewort (Artemisia frigida) and other sagebrush species (Artemisia). In dry years the dominant vegetation is grasses including feather grasses (Stipa spp.) and wheatgrasses, and shrubs such as Caragana and the Gobi apricot.

== Fauna ==
Thirty-three species of mammals have been recorded in the reserve. It is home to several ungulates including argali sheep, Siberian ibex, goitered gazelle, Mongolian gazelle and Asiatic wild ass. Several of these are threatened or endangered. Carnivores include marbled polecat, European badger, corsac fox, red fox, grey wolf, Pallas's cat and Eurasian lynx. Among the smaller mammals present in the reserve are jerboas, gerbils, voles, hamsters, long-tailed ground squirrels, tolai hare, Mongolian pika, hedgehogs and bats, and the long-tailed dwarf hamster (Cricetulus longicaudatus) has recently been added to the list.

Three species of snake have been recorded; Pallas's coluber, slender racer and Central Asian viper, and three lizards; variegated toadhead agama, Mongolian racerunner and multi-ocellated racerunner.

The reserve has been designated by BirdLife International as an Important Bird Area. Among the 125 species of bird that have been recorded in the reserve are Himalayan vulture, cinereous vulture, eagles, buzzards, kites, hawks, sandgrouse, owls, wildfowl, and a wide range of resident and migratory passerine birds.
