= Airag =

Airag may refer to:

- Kumis, or airag, a traditional fermented dairy product made from mare milk
- Airag, Dornogovi, a district and town in Mongolia
- Airag Lake, in Zavkhan, Uvs Province, Mongolia
