= Dalanjargalan =

District in Dornogovi Province, Mongolia

Coordinates: 45°55′12″N 109°03′55″E

Dalanjargalan District Даланжаргалан сум ᠳᠠᠯᠠᠨᠵᠢᠷᠭᠠᠯᠠᠩᠰᠤᠮᠤ
- District
- Interactive map of Dalanjargalan District
- Country: Mongolia
- Province: Dornogovi
- Established: 1924

Area
  - Total: 4,045.9 km^{2} (1,562.1 sq mi)

Population (2025)
  - Total: 2,766
- Time zone: UTC+8

Dalanjargalan (Mongolian: Даланжаргалан) is a sums (district) in Dornogovi Province in south-eastern Mongolia. It covers an area of approximately 4,045.9 km^{2} (1,562.1 sq mi) and had a population of 2,766 in 2025. Located in the Gobi desert, the district is home to nomadic pastoral communities and hosts several mines.

== Geography ==
Dalanjargalan is one of the fourteen sums (district) in the Dornogovi Province in southeastern Mongolia. It became part of Dornogovi Province when the province was established by law in 1930. Spread across 4,045.9 km^{2} (1,562.1 sq mi), it is bordered by the provinces of Dundgovi, Govisümber, and Khentii to the west and north, and the districts of Airag and Ikhkhet of the Dornogovi Province to the east and south. It is located 305 km (190 mi) from the national capital of Ulaanbaatar and 156 km (97 mi) from the provincial capital Sainshand. The area forms part of the Gobi desert, and consists of low lying semi-arid terrain with a dry climate. Dalanjargalan is divided into five bags–Eldev, Ungut, Bichigt, Tsomog, and Olon-Ovoo. Tsomog serves as the administrative center and hosts most of the government buildings and facilities.

The Ikh Nartiin Chuluu Nature Reserve is spread across Airag and Dalanjargalan districts of the Dornogovi Province. The reserve, spread over 66,000 hectares (160,000 acres), was established in 1996 and is one of the key habitats of argali (mountain sheep).

== Demographics ==
According to a study by the Women's Land Tenure Security (WOLTS) Project recorded 2,641 registered residents in 916 households in July 2016. As per the WOLTS report, about 36% of the population were aged 18 or under and 8% of the population were aged 65 or above. The Khalkhas formed the largest ethnic group and Buddhism was the majority religion. As per the 2020 census, the district had a population of 3,007 people living in 963 households. As of 2025, the district had a population of 2,766 which included 1,489 males and 1,277 females.

== Economy ==
The economy is dependent on animal husbandry and mining. Majority of the native population are nomadic herders. Of the five bags, while Tsomog, and Olon-Ovoo are inhabited by government and mining employees, and women and children of nomadic herders, the other three bags mostly host native pastoral communities. A portion of Bichigt is part of Ikh Nart reserve, and hosts several springs and health spas. Ungut has limited agriculture and few health spas. As of 2024, the district had 134,979 livestock including 63,002 sheep, 58,540 goats, 5,653 horses, 910 camels, and 6,874 other cattle. There were 350 herder households and 511 households owning livestock.

The district has several mines and is one of the districts with the highest number of mining licences nationally. As of 2023, 93 mining licences had been granted to 73 companies in the district. Eldev, Ungut, and parts of Bichigt (outside the Ikh Nart reserve) host several coal, fluorspar, and iron ore mines. Olon-Ovoo hosts several mineral processing factories. While mining expanded significantly, it became a major source of pressure on traditional pastoral communities as it reduced the amount of pastoral lands available to the herders and contaminated the scarce water resources.

== Infrastructure ==
The district is located on the Trans-Mongolian Railway. Tsomog and Olon-Ovoo straddle the road connecting and railway lines running between Ulaanbaatar and the Mongolia-China border.

The district has a secondary school, primary school and kindergarten. In 2021, the gross enrolment ratio was 77.5% and 93.4% for the secondary and primary school respectively.
