= Mongol Refinery =

Oil refinery in Altanshiree, Dornogovi, Mongolia

Mongol Refinery Монголын Газрын Тос Боловсруулах Үйлдвэр
- Location within Mongolia
- Location: Altanshiree, Dornogovi, Mongolia; 45°00′05.0″N 110°20′54.6″E

Refinery details
- Owner: Mongol Refinery State Owned LLC
- Opened: 2026 (planned)
- Capacity: 1.5 million tons/year

The Mongol Refinery (Mongolian: Монголын Газрын Тос Боловсруулах Үйлдвэр) is an oil refinery under construction in Altanshiree, Dornogovi Province, Mongolia.

== History ==
The feasibility study to establish the refinery was approved by the Ministry of Mining and Heavy Industry on 15 November 2018. In October 2020, the engineering, procurement, and construction contract was signed with JMC Projects India. In January 2021, the groundbreaking work was held. The refinery is planned to be commissioned in 2026 but it was delayed until 2028.

== Architecture ==
The refinery will consist of three modules, which are EPC 2, EPC 3 and EPC 4. EPC 2 will consist of an integrated crude distillation unit, vacuum distillation unit and saturated gas plant. EPC 3 will consist of captive power plant. EPC 4 will consist of various units, plant buildings, satellite rack rooms and substation.

As part of the supporting infrastructure for the refinery, various utility-level constructions have been made. The refinery is connected by the 17.2 km road to the national highway, 27 km railway to the existing Trans-Mongolian Railway and 110 kV transmission line to the existing national grid.

== Technical specifications ==
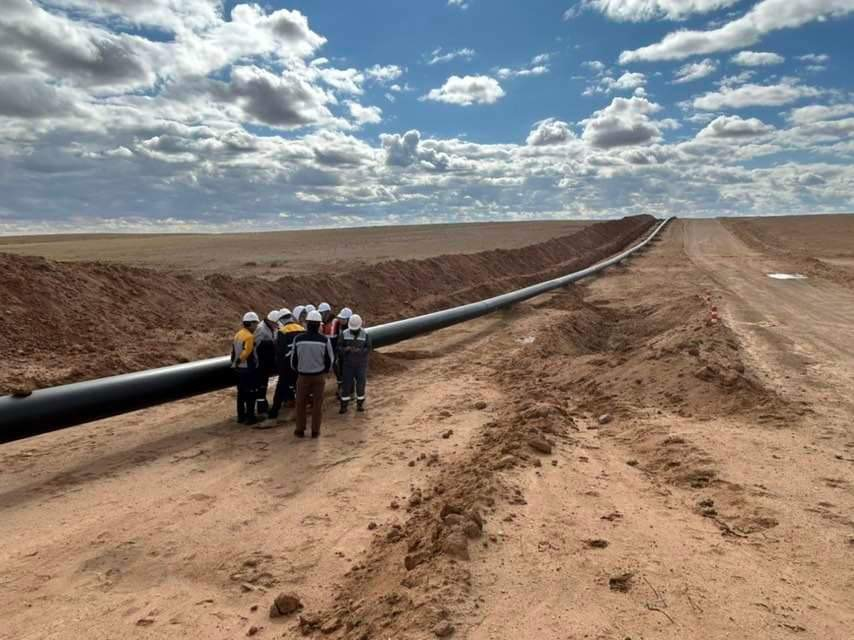
Underground oil pipepline under construction to connect the refinery to oil wells

Once completed, the refinery will have an annual petroleum processing capacity of 1.5 million tons. The refinery will be connected to two oil wells of Toson Uul XIX and Tamsag XXI by a 530-km underground oil pipeline.

== Finance ==
The refinery will cost around US$1.698 billion. The funds will be provided by the Exim Bank of India under loan agreement with a total repayment period of 20 years and 1.75% annual interest rate.

The Indian investment in a Mongolian oil refinery is part of its broader “Act East” policy, which aims to counterbalance China’s economic dominance in the region.

== See also ==
- List of oil refineries
- Mining in Mongolia
