= Erdene, Dornogovi =

District in Dornogovi Province, Mongolia

Coordinates: 44°26′39″N 111°05′33″E

Erdene District Эрдэнэ сум ᠡᠷᠳᠡᠨᠢᠰᠤᠮᠤ
- District
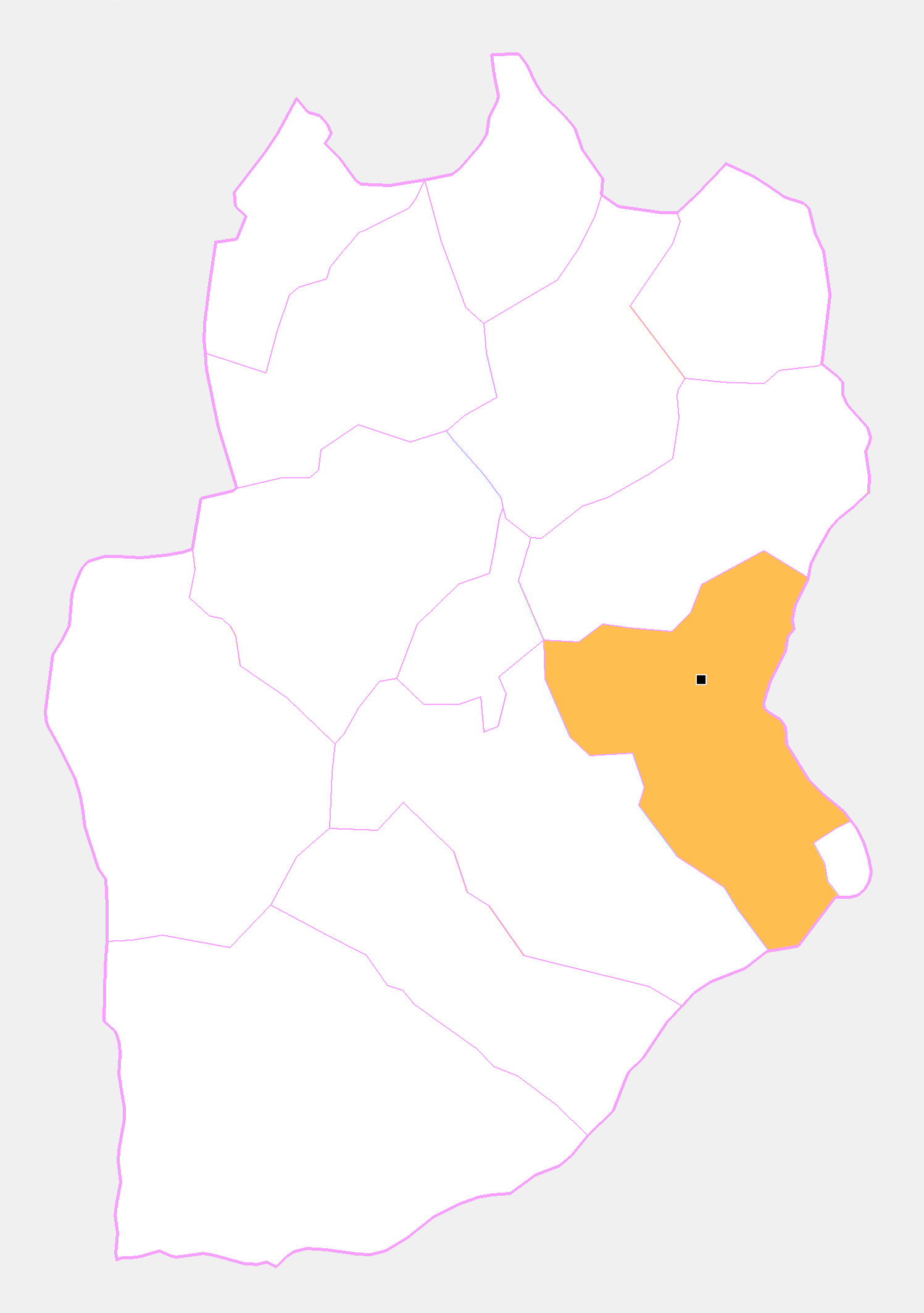
- Erdene District in Dornogovi Province
- Country: Mongolia
- Province: Dornogovi Province

Area
  - Total: 9,952.04 km^{2} (3,842.50 sq mi)
- Time zone: UTC+8 (UTC + 8)

Erdene (Mongolian: Эрдэнэ) is a sum (district) of Dornogovi Province in south-eastern Mongolia. In 2009, its population was 2,395. Its population in 2025 was 2,271.

== Administrative divisions ==
The district is divided into five bags, which are:

- Burdene
- Durvulj
- Tsagaan Khutul
- Ulaan-Uul
- Yenshuuv
