= Sainshand =

Provincial capital of Dornogovi Province, Mongolia

Sainshand District Сайншанд сум ᠰᠠᠶᠢᠨᠱᠠᠩᠳᠠᠰᠤᠮᠤ
- District
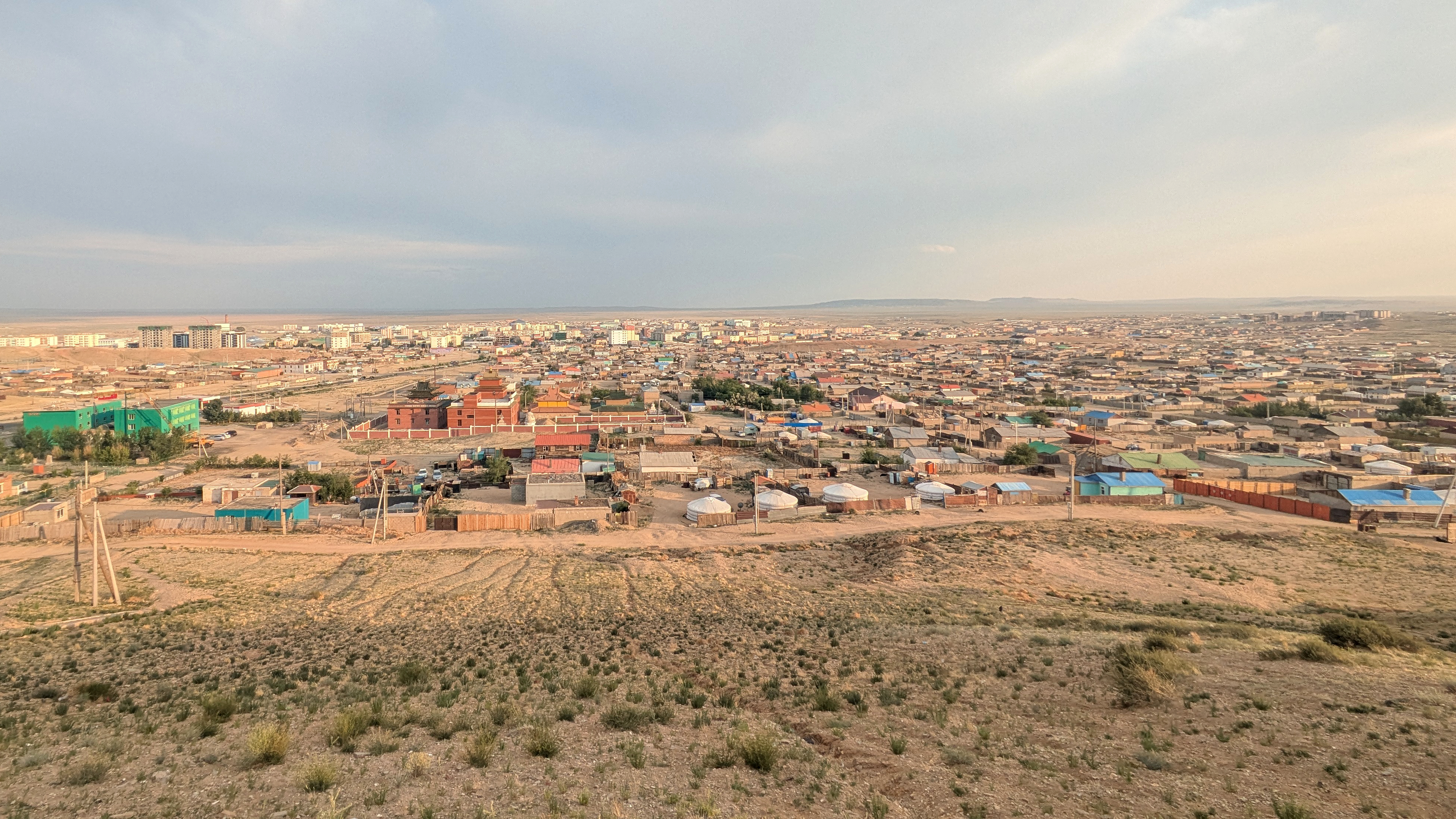
- Sainshand in 2025

- Location within Mongolia
- Coordinates: 44°53′30″N 110°8′12″E
- Country: Mongolia
- Province: Dornogovi
- Founded: 1931

Area
  - Total: 2,300 km^{2} (890 sq mi)
- Elevation: 961 m (3,153 ft)

Population (2025)
  - Total: 28,250
  - Density: 12/km^{2} (32/sq mi)
- Time zone: UTC+8 (UTC + 8)
- Area code: (+976) 1522

Sainshand (Mongolian: Сайншанд) is a sum (district) of Dornogovi Province in south-eastern Mongolia. It serves as the capital of the province. It is located in the eastern Gobi Desert steppe, on the Trans-Mongolian Railway.

== History ==
The Khamar Monastery was founded by Dulduityn Danzanravjaa, the leader of the Red Hat sect, in 1821. Sainshand district was established in 1931.

== Geography ==
Sainshand is one of the fourteen sums (district) in the Dornogovi Province. The city of Sainshand serves as the capital of the province. Spread across 2,300 km^{2} (890 sq mi) of land area in the eastern Gobi Desert steppe, it is located 460 km (290 mi) from the national capital of Ulaanbaatar. It is bordered by Airag, Altanshiree, Khuvsgul, Örgön, Saikhandulaan, and Ulaanbadrakh districts. The district is divided into five bags (communes) including Züünbayan.

=== Climate ===
Sainshand is located at an altitude of 940–960 m (3,080–3,150 ft). It experiences a desert climate with average maximum temperatures reaching 31 °C (88 °F) in the hottest month of July and dropping to −11 °C (12 °F) in the coldest month of January. It receives low rainfall with annual precipitation of 110 mm (4.3 in).

Climate data for Sainshand, elevation 938 m (3,077 ft), (1991–2020, extremes 1938–present)
Month	Jan	Feb	Mar	Apr	May	Jun	Jul	Aug	Sep	Oct	Nov	Dec	Year
Record high °C (°F)	8.2 (46.8)	12.9 (55.2)	24.4 (75.9)	31.1 (88.0)	36.9 (98.4)	40.0 (104.0)	41.8 (107.2)	39.0 (102.2)	36.2 (97.2)	30.3 (86.5)	18.3 (64.9)	6.2 (43.2)	41.8 (107.2)
Mean daily maximum °C (°F)	−11.4 (11.5)	−4.4 (24.1)	5.5 (41.9)	15.4 (59.7)	22.8 (73.0)	28.4 (83.1)	30.9 (87.6)	28.5 (83.3)	22.3 (72.1)	12.5 (54.5)	0.2 (32.4)	−9.5 (14.9)	11.8 (53.2)
Daily mean °C (°F)	−17.3 (0.9)	−11.6 (11.1)	−2.2 (28.0)	7.7 (45.9)	15.4 (59.7)	21.7 (71.1)	24.5 (76.1)	22.1 (71.8)	15.3 (59.5)	5.4 (41.7)	−6.2 (20.8)	−15.1 (4.8)	5.0 (41.0)
Mean daily minimum °C (°F)	−22.1 (−7.8)	−17.6 (0.3)	−9.0 (15.8)	0.5 (32.9)	8.2 (46.8)	15.1 (59.2)	18.5 (65.3)	16.0 (60.8)	8.7 (47.7)	−0.7 (30.7)	−11.4 (11.5)	−19.6 (−3.3)	−1.1 (30.0)
Record low °C (°F)	−37.2 (−35.0)	−33.9 (−29.0)	−27.8 (−18.0)	−17.8 (0.0)	−8.0 (17.6)	0.0 (32.0)	6.7 (44.1)	5.9 (42.6)	−4.7 (23.5)	−17.2 (1.0)	−32.2 (−26.0)	−35 (−31)	−37.2 (−35.0)
Average precipitation mm (inches)	0.9 (0.04)	1 (0.0)	1 (0.0)	4 (0.2)	10 (0.4)	20 (0.8)	28 (1.1)	27 (1.1)	12 (0.5)	4 (0.2)	2 (0.1)	1 (0.0)	111 (4.4)
Average precipitation days (≥ 1.0 mm)	1.4	1.2	1.4	1.7	2.2	3.8	5.0	4.1	2.3	1.5	1.7	1.4	27.8
Average relative humidity (%)	68.2	58.7	43.3	33.9	34.4	40.6	46.6	48.0	43.6	45.8	57.3	66.5	48.9
Source 1: Pogoda.ru.net
Source 2: NOAA

== Demographics and economy ==
As of 2025, Sainshand district had a population of 28,250 which included 13,503 males and 14,747 females. The population increased from 20,526 individuals recorded in 2010.

Sainshand is a major commercial hub in the province. The economy is based on mining, trade, and animal husbandry. Industries include the production of sand and stucco for building materials, mining of fluorite, zeolite, lignite, uranium, and exploration of oil. The district hosted 677 registered industries, which is more than half of the 1,261 registered in the province. Compared to other rural districts in the province, where herding is a major occupation, only 3.8% of the households in the district are engaged in animal husbandry. As per the 2025 livestock census, the district had 72,802 livestock including 31,875 goats, 25,217 sheep, 7,137 horses, 3,919 camels, and 4,654 other cattle.

== Infrastructure ==
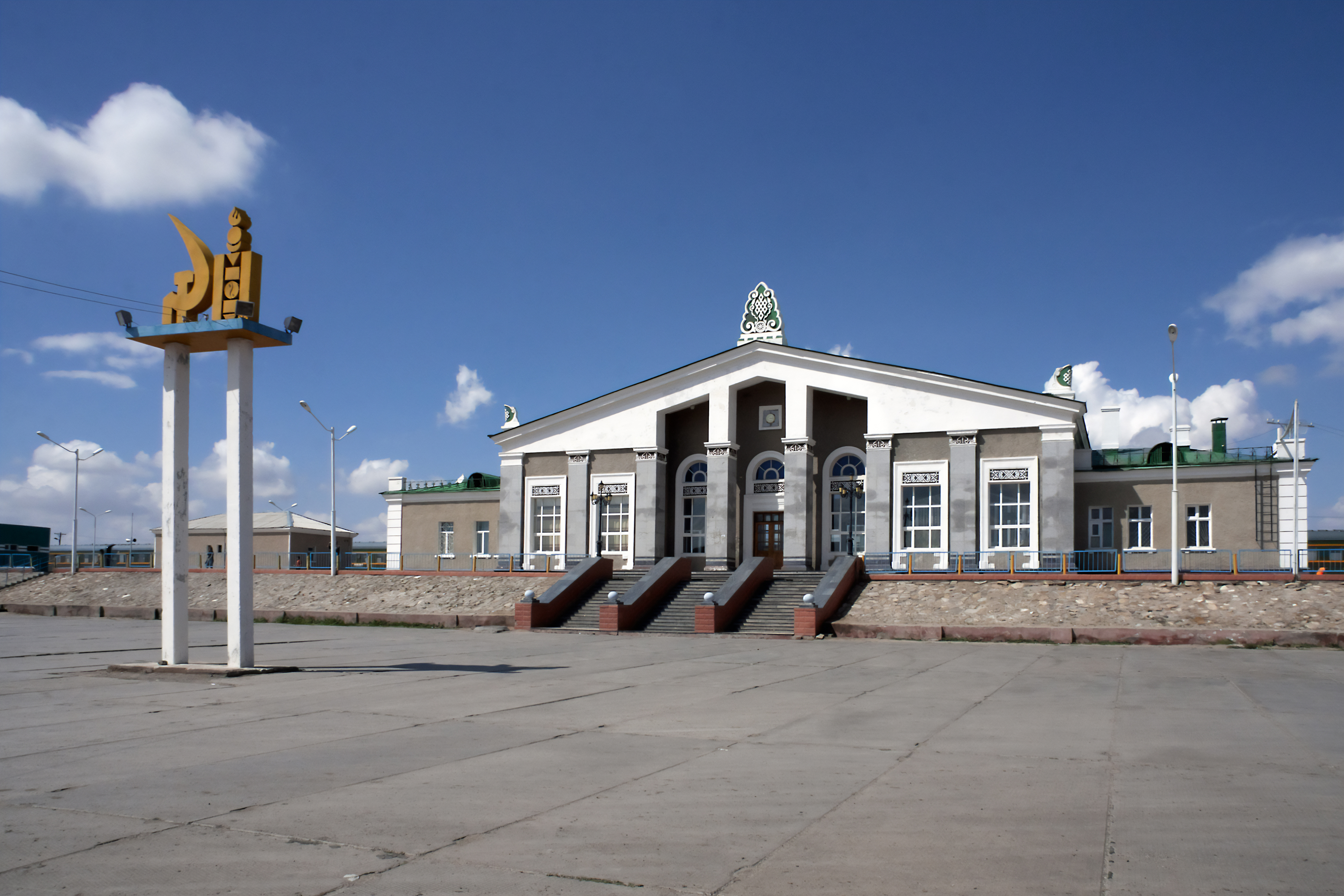
Sainshand Railway Station

The Choir-Sainshand road, which forms part of the Asian Highway 3, connects Sainshand and Choir. The Trans-Mongolian Railway, connecting Ulaanbaatar, runs through Sainshand. There are several chord railway lines originating from Sainshand, including those connecting to Züünbayan and Mongol Oil Refinery in Altanshiree.

As the provincial center, Sainshand hosts majority of the medical infrastructure of the province including the general hospital and five public schools. It also hosts the Central Library of Dornogovi Province, and the Danzanravjaa Museum, dedicated to Danzanravjaa.

The Gobi Solar Power Plant, with a power generating capacity of 30 MW capacity, was commissioned in February 2019. The Sainshand Wind Farm, with a 55 MW capacity, became operational in the same month.
