= Ulaanbadrakh =

District in Dornogovi Province, Mongolia

Coordinates: 43°52′16″N 110°25′24″E

Ulaanbadrakh District Улаанбадрах сум ᠤᠯᠠᠭᠠᠨᠪᠠᠳᠠᠷᠠᠬᠤᠰᠤᠮᠤ
- District
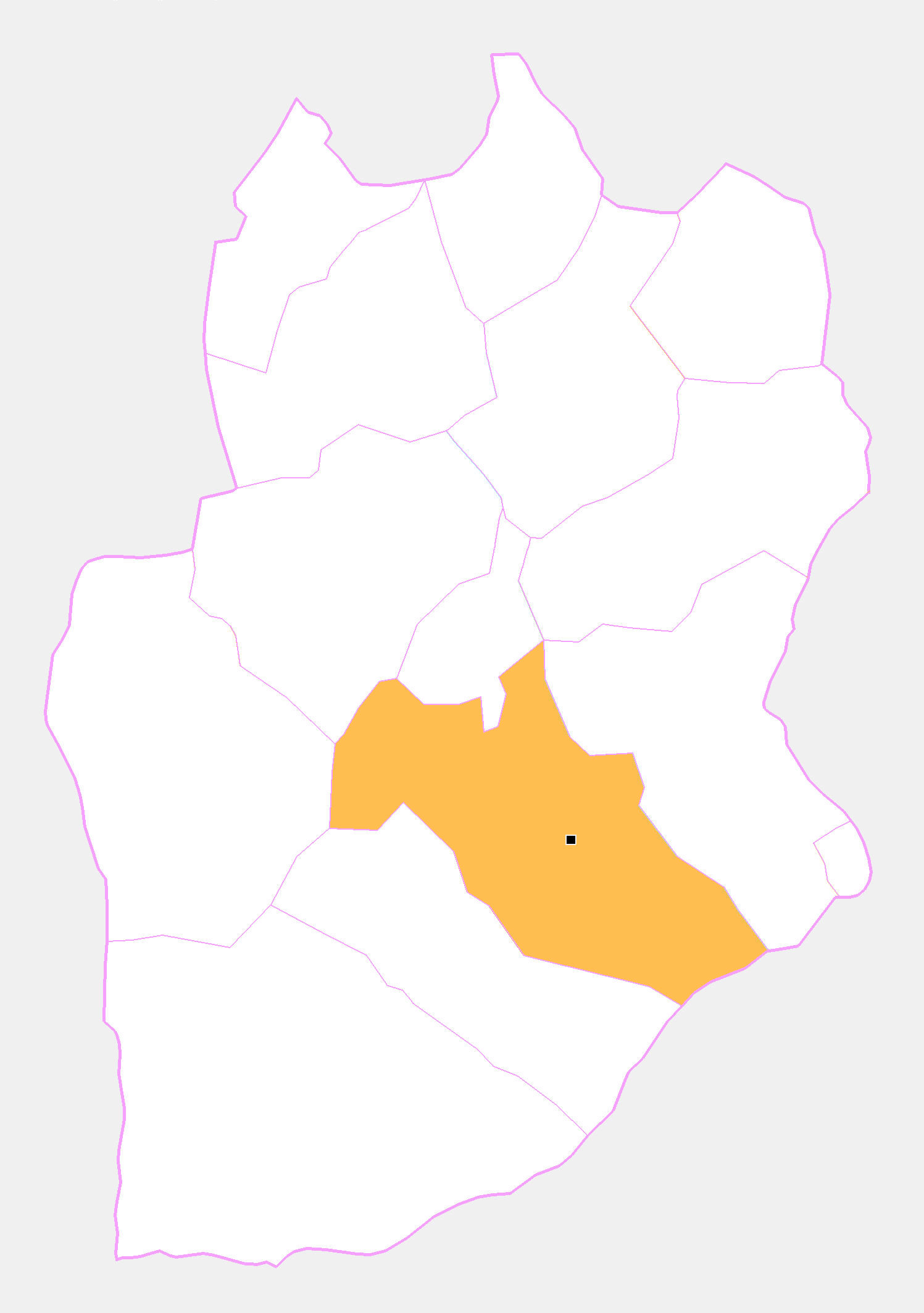
- Ulaanbadrakh District in Dornogovi Province
- Country: Mongolia
- Province: Dornogovi Province

Area
  - Total: 11,370.92 km^{2} (4,390.34 sq mi)
- Time zone: UTC+8 (UTC + 8)

Ulaanbadrakh (Mongolian: Улаанбадрах, Red blossom) is a sum (district) of Dornogovi Province in south-eastern Mongolia. In 2009, its population was 1,543.

== Administrative divisions ==
The district is divided into four bags, which are:

- Argalant
- Bayanbogd
- Nuden
- Sangiin Dalai
