= Galshar, Khentii =

District in Khentii Province, Mongolia

Coordinates: 46°14′28″N 110°50′29″E

Galshar District Галшар сум ᠭᠠᠯᠰᠢᠷᠰᠤᠮᠤ
- District
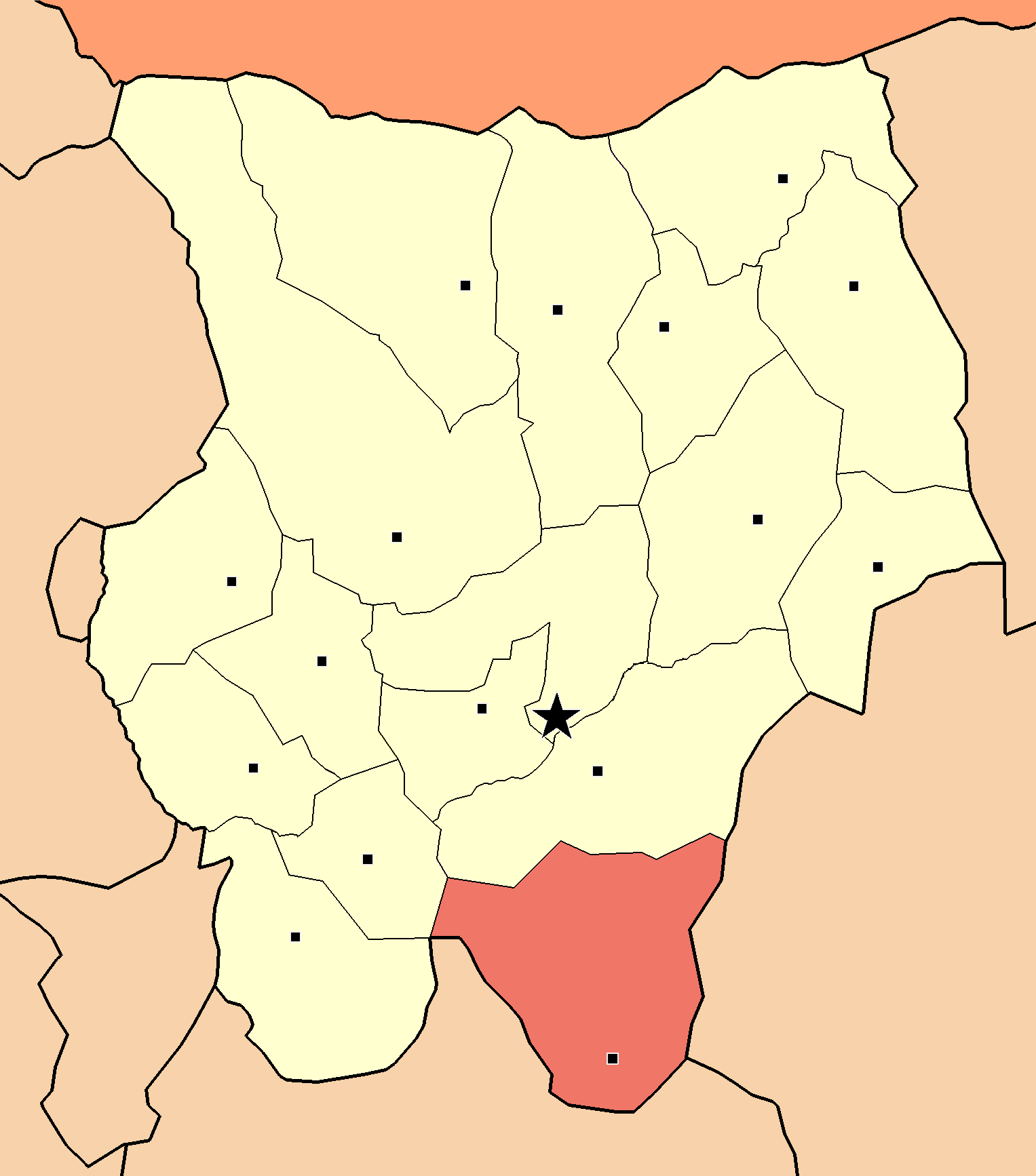
- Galshar District in Khentii Province
- Country: Mongolia
- Province: Khentii Province

Area
  - Total: 6,676 km^{2} (2,578 sq mi)
- Time zone: UTC+8 (UTC + 8)

Galshar (Mongolian: Галшар "Fire Yellow", also Gal-Shar, Buyant) is a sum (district) of Khentii Province in eastern Mongolia. Sum center former location was 41 33 49 16N 110 46 04 16 E. In 2010, its population was 1,807.

== History ==
In 1931, the district was divided into Galshar and Buyant districts. However, in 1979 they were both reunified.

== Geography ==
Galshar is the southern most district in Khentii Province. It is also the third largest district in the province.

== Administrative divisions ==
The district is divided into six bags, which are:

- Arvin (Арвин)
- Bayanbadral (Баянбадрал)
- Buyantbulag (Буянтбулаг)
- Jargalant (Жаргалант)
- Sangiindalai (Сангийн далай)
- Och (Оч)
