= Airag, Dornogovi =

District in Dornogovi Province, Mongolia

Airag District Айраг сум ᠠᠶᠢᠷᠠᠭᠰᠤᠮᠤ
- District
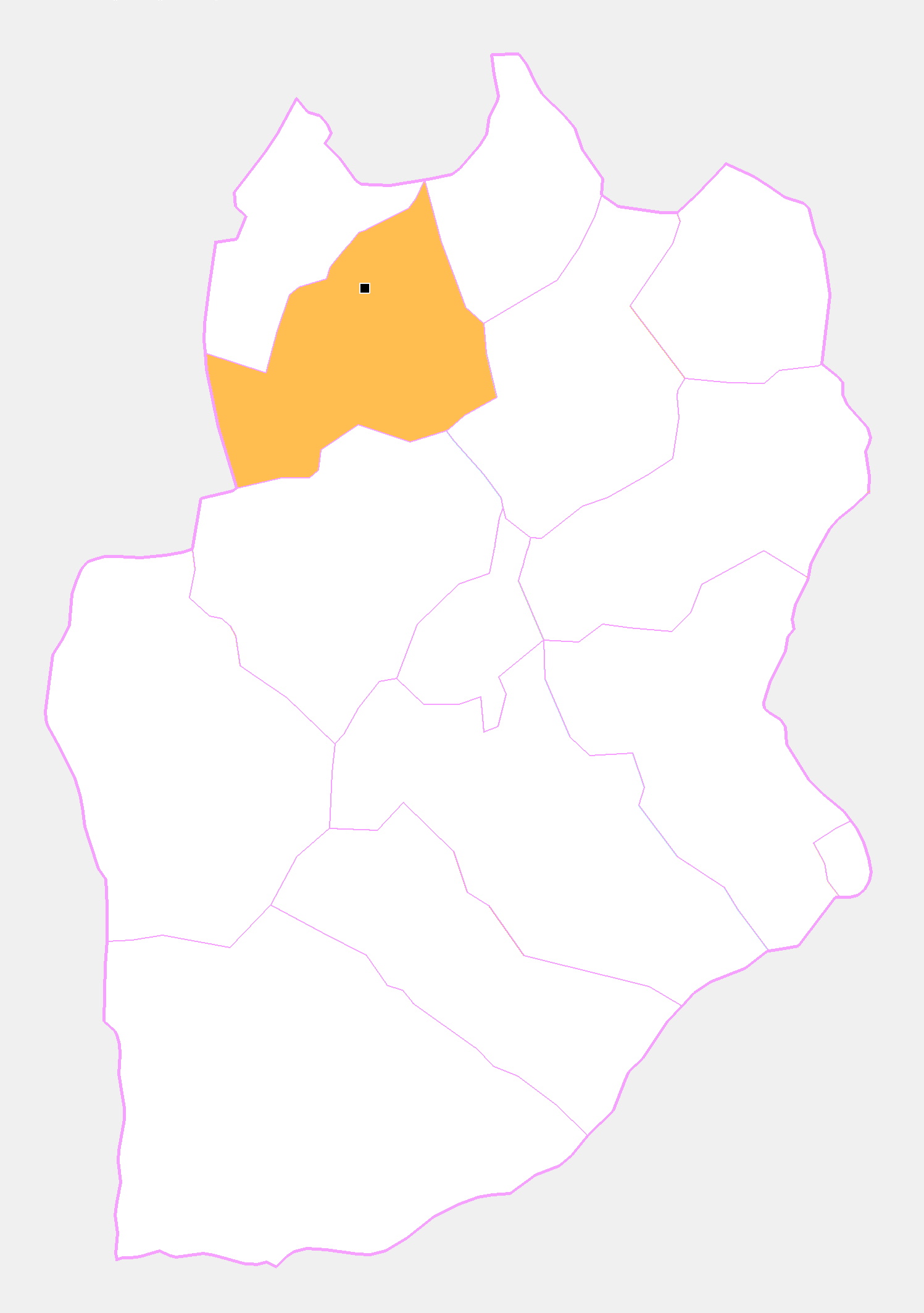
- Airag District in Dornogovi Province

- Location in Mongolia
- Coordinates: 45°47′58″N 109°18′48″E
- Country: Mongolia
- Province: Dornogovi

Area
  - Total: 7,442.6 km^{2} (2,873.6 sq mi)

Population (2020)
  - Total: 3,638

Airag (Mongolian: Айраг, also Khar-Airag, Hara-Ayrag, Kumis) is a sum (district) in Dornogovi Province in south-eastern Mongolia. It covers an area of approximately 7,442.6 km^{2} (2,873.6 sq mi) and had a population of 3,638 in 2020.

== Geography ==
Airag is one of the fourteen sums (district) in the Dorngovi Province in south eastern Mongolia. It was established in 1927, and became part of Dornogovi Province when the province was established by the 18th decision of the Little Khural of 1930. The district is spread across 7,442.6 km^{2} (2,873.6 sq mi) of land area. Khar airag, the center of the district, is located 130 km (81 mi) from the provincial capital Sainshand and 330 km (210 mi) south of the national capital of Ulaanbaatar. It is located along the highway and railway line connecting it with Zamyn-Uud. The district does not have any forest cover. It is divided into four bags–Nard, Nuden, Sain-Us, and Tsagaan Durvulj.

The Ikh Nartiin Chuluu Nature Reserve is spread across Airag and Dalanjargalan districts of the Dornogovi Province. The reserve, spread over 66,000 hectares (160,000 acres), was established in 1996. It consists of semi-arid plains in the Gobi desert and is one of the key habitats of argali (mountain sheep).

== Demographics and economy ==
The district had a population of 3,598 inhabitants as per the 2009 census. As of 2025, the district had a population of 3,563 which included 1,838 males and 1,725 females.

As per the 2025 livestock census, the district had 126,220 livestock including 58,212 sheep, 55,348 goats, 5,810 horses, 1,479 camels, and 5,371 other cattle. In 2019, out of the 1,093 households in the district, there were 350 herder households and 440 families owning livestock. There is a fluorite mine operated by Khukhtur located about 8 km (5.0 mi) from the administrative centre of the district. The extracted fluorspar is usually transported by rail to Bor-Öndör, 60 km (37 mi) away for further processing.
