= Zamyn-Üüd =

District in Dornogovi Province, Mongolia

Zamyn-Üüd District Замын-Үүд сум ᠵᠠᠮ ᠤᠨᠡᠭᠦᠳᠡᠰᠤᠮᠤ
- District
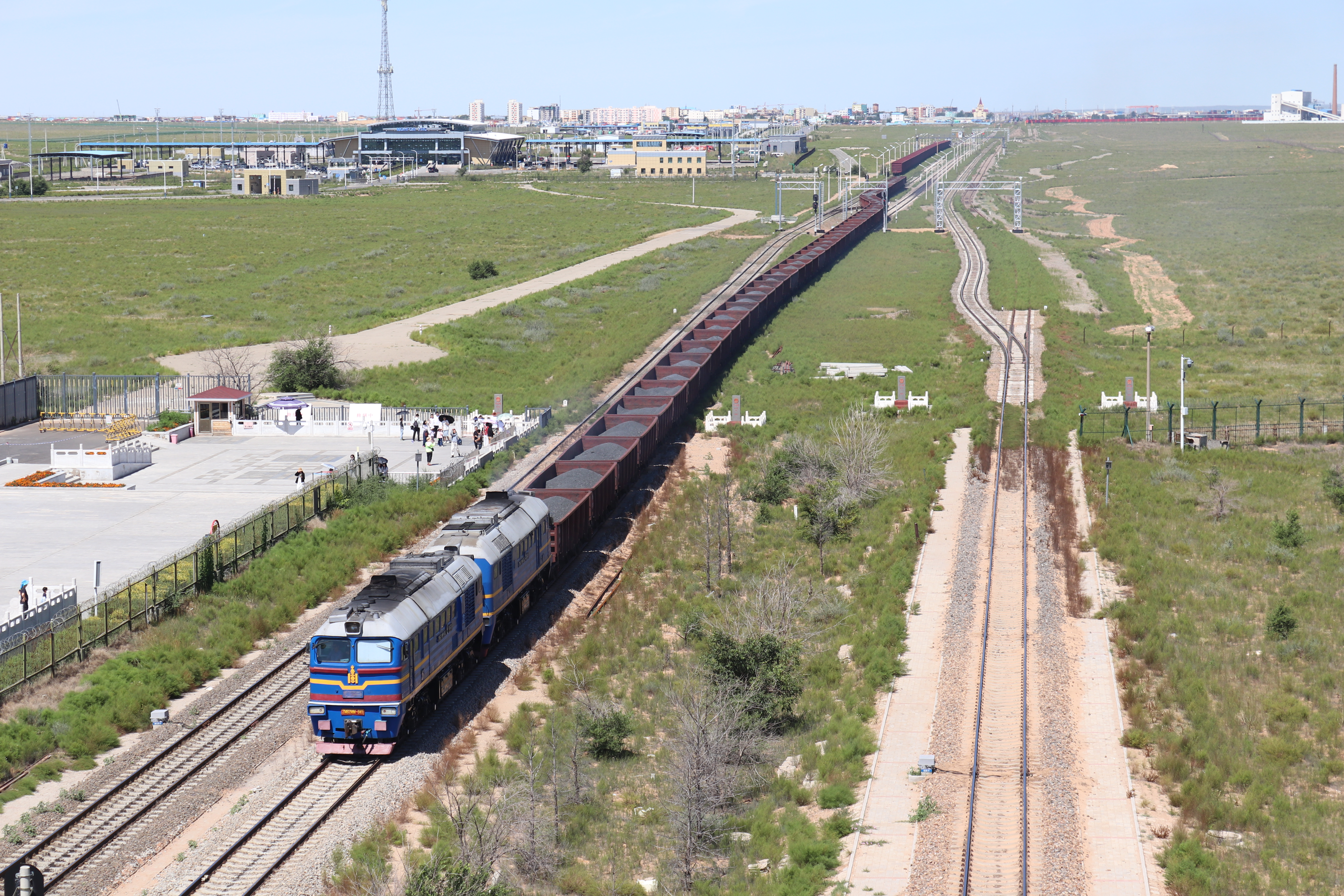
- View of Zamyn-Üüd from Erlian

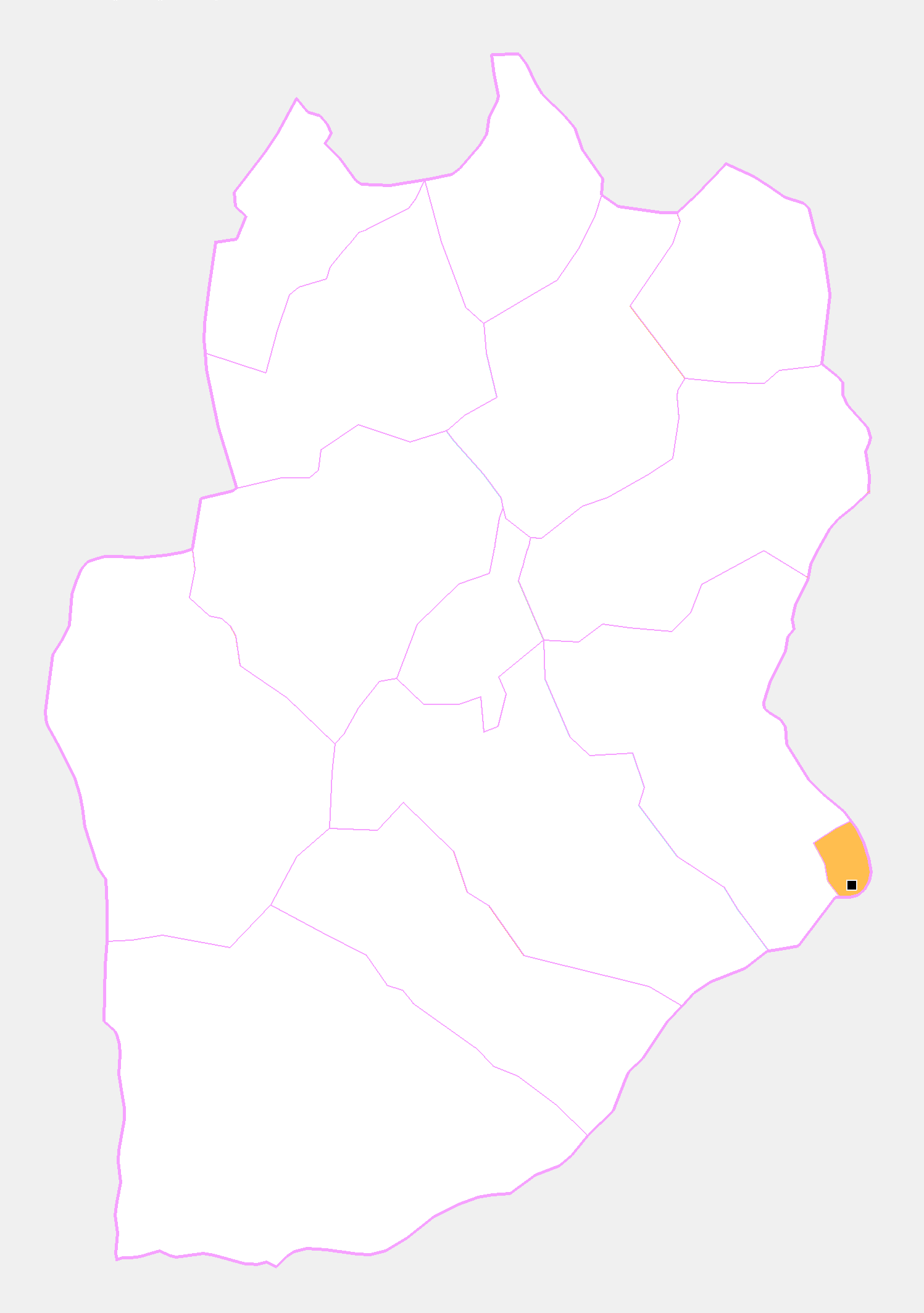
- Zamyn-Üüd District in Dornogovi Province

- Location within Mongolia
- Coordinates: 43°43′01″N 111°54′20″E
- Country: Mongolia
- Province: Dornogovi
- Time zone: UTC+8 (UTC + 8)

Zamyn-Üüd (Mongolian: Замын-Үүд; ᠵᠠᠮ ᠤᠨ ᠡᠭᠦᠳᠡ, road's gate) is a sum (district) of Dornogovi Province in southeastern Mongolia. Its population was 11,527 in 2008.

== History ==
Zamyn-Üüd's actual name comes from the former Dzamiin Üüde settlement located 101 kilometres (63 mi) northwest from the modern town (44°30′N 111°15′E).

== Geography ==
=== Overview ===
The town is located on the old trade route between Beijing and Urga/Ulaanbaatar, and is now the most important border crossing between Mongolia and the People's Republic of China, via Erenhot. The border control counted more than 950,000 border crossings in 2004. In April 2007, the construction of a 432 kilometres (268 mi) paved road from Choir to Zamyn-Üüd via Sainshand began. Completion was planned for October 2007. However, completion of the road project was pushed back to 2013, with Sainshand to Choir section being finished in September, 2013. A new expanded road border crossing was also completed in 2013 to relieve delays in crossing from China to Mongolia.

The "Zamyn-Uud" Free Economic Zone was officially created in 2004. It has an area of 900 ha and is located between Zamyn-Üüd settlement and the Chinese border.

=== Climate ===
Zamyn-Üüd has a cold desert climate (Köppen climate classification BWk) with very warm summers and very cold winters. Most precipitation falls in the summer as rain, with some snow in the adjacent months of May and September. Winters are very dry.

Climate data for Zamyn-Üüd
Month	Jan	Feb	Mar	Apr	May	Jun	Jul	Aug	Sep	Oct	Nov	Dec	Year
Record high °C (°F)	6.5 (43.7)	14.5 (58.1)	25.4 (77.7)	35.0 (95.0)	37.6 (99.7)	39.9 (103.8)	42.4 (108.3)	38.9 (102.0)	36.2 (97.2)	30.5 (86.9)	18.8 (65.8)	10.5 (50.9)	42.4 (108.3)
Mean daily maximum °C (°F)	−11.0 (12.2)	−6.0 (21.2)	4.8 (40.6)	14.4 (57.9)	23.0 (73.4)	27.8 (82.0)	29.8 (85.6)	27.7 (81.9)	21.4 (70.5)	13.0 (55.4)	1.4 (34.5)	−8.6 (16.5)	11.5 (52.6)
Daily mean °C (°F)	−18.5 (−1.3)	−14.5 (5.9)	−4.5 (23.9)	5.9 (42.6)	14.4 (57.9)	20.2 (68.4)	22.8 (73.0)	20.8 (69.4)	13.5 (56.3)	4.4 (39.9)	−6.6 (20.1)	−15.9 (3.4)	3.5 (38.3)
Mean daily minimum °C (°F)	−24.7 (−12.5)	−21.8 (−7.2)	−11.9 (10.6)	−2.0 (28.4)	6.8 (44.2)	12.4 (54.3)	16.2 (61.2)	14.3 (57.7)	6.7 (44.1)	−2.3 (27.9)	−12.7 (9.1)	−21.8 (−7.2)	−3.4 (25.9)
Record low °C (°F)	−39 (−38)	−36.1 (−33.0)	−30 (−22)	−18.6 (−1.5)	−8.0 (17.6)	−1.7 (28.9)	2.7 (36.9)	3.3 (37.9)	−7.0 (19.4)	−19.0 (−2.2)	−30 (−22)	−35.2 (−31.4)	−39.0 (−38.2)
Average precipitation mm (inches)	1.9 (0.07)	1.3 (0.05)	1.6 (0.06)	3.8 (0.15)	7.1 (0.28)	14.9 (0.59)	28.5 (1.12)	29.1 (1.15)	14.0 (0.55)	5.8 (0.23)	1.9 (0.07)	1.1 (0.04)	111 (4.36)
Average precipitation days (≥ 1.0 mm)	0.6	0.3	0.6	1.0	1.6	2.6	5.0	4.7	2.7	1.2	0.8	0.4	21.5
Source 1: NOAA (1961-1990)
Source 2: Meteo Climat (record highs and lows)
