= Örgön =

District in Dornogovi Province, Mongolia

Coordinates: 44°43′40″N 110°46′36″E

Örgön District Өргөн сум ᠥᠷᠭᠡᠨᠰᠤᠮᠤ
- District
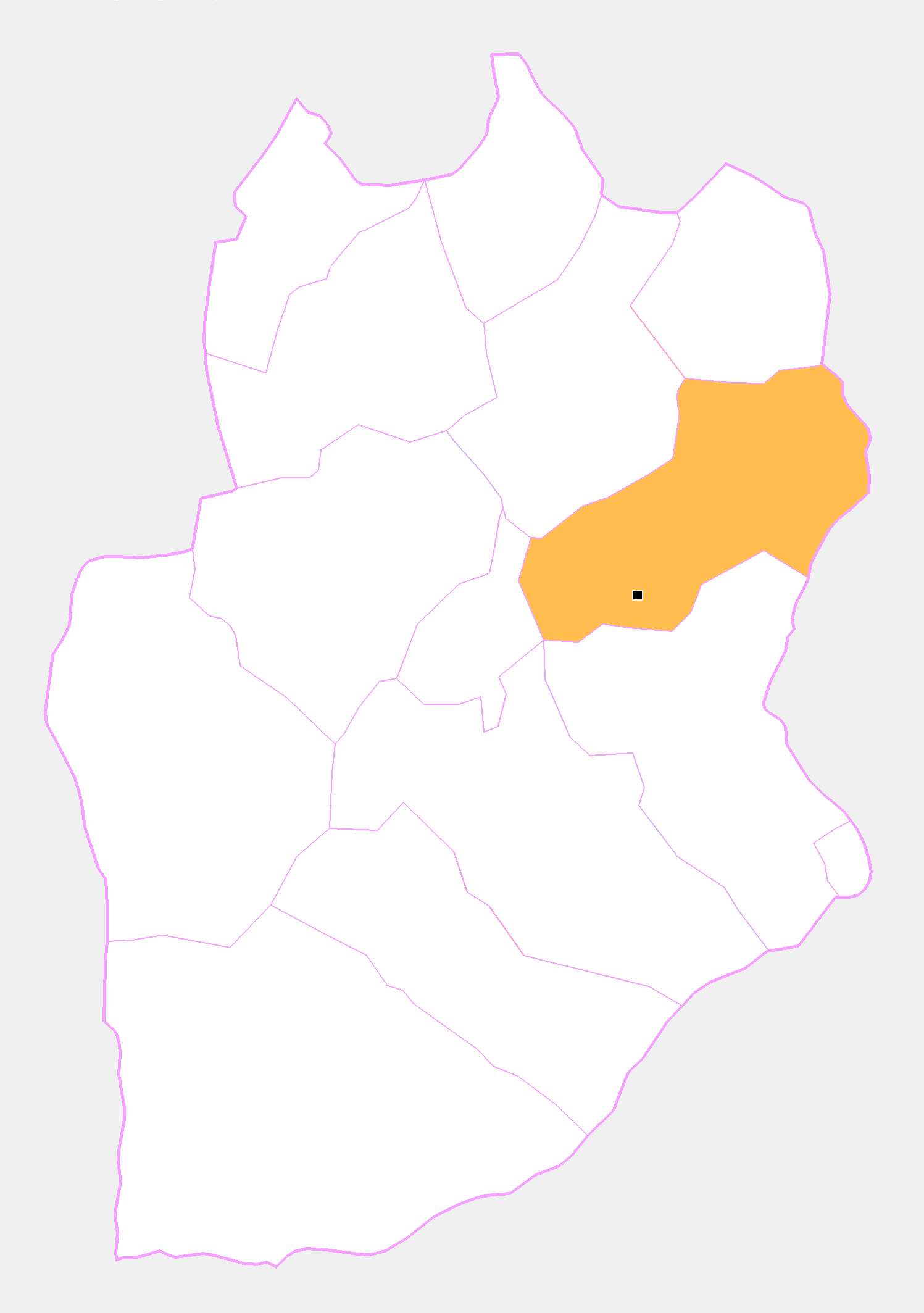
- Örgön District in Dornogovi Province
- Country: Mongolia
- Province: Dornogovi Province

Area
  - Total: 8,689.65 km^{2} (3,355.09 sq mi)
- Time zone: UTC+8 (UTC + 8)

Örgön (Mongolian: Өргөн, also Urgen, Wide) is a sum (district) of Dornogovi Province in south-eastern Mongolia. The fluorspar mine (fluorspar is transported to the Bor-Öndör processing plant) and the railway station are the main pillars of the Örgön settlement economy. In 2009, its population was 1,816.

== Administrative divisions ==
The district is divided into four bags, which are:

- Bayanmunkh
- Senj
- Sumber
- Sumiin bulag
