= Ikhkhet =

District in Dornogovi Province, Mongolia

Coordinates: 46°14′57″N 110°10′29″E

Ikhkhet District Иххэт сум ᠶᠡᠬᠡᠬᠡᠲᠡᠰᠤᠮᠤ
- District
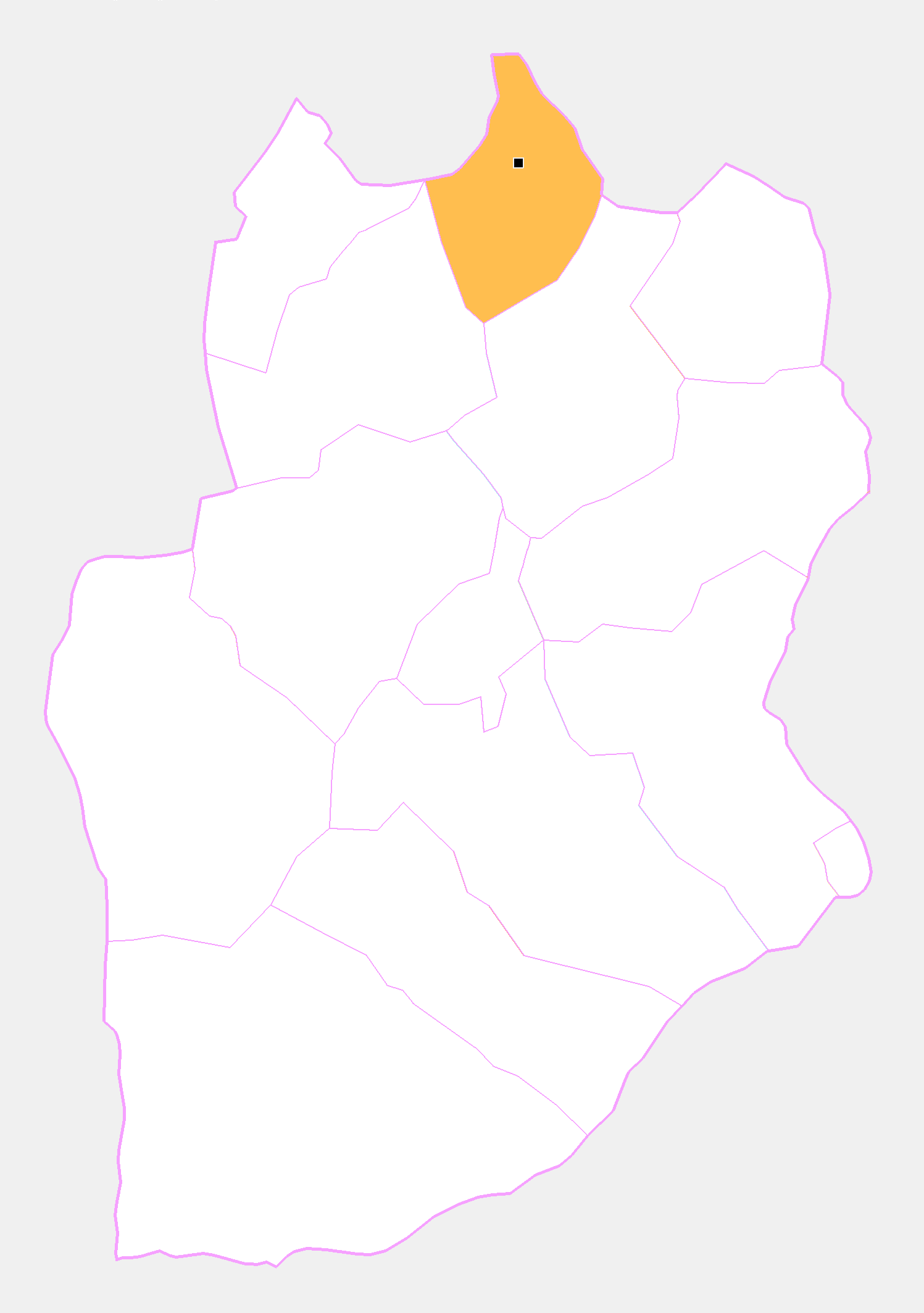
- Ikhkhet District in Dornogovi Province
- Country: Mongolia
- Province: Dornogovi Province

Area
  - Total: 4,152.52 km^{2} (1,603.30 sq mi)
- Time zone: UTC+8 (UTC + 8)

Ikhkhet (Mongolian: Иххэт) is a sum (district) of Dornogovi Province in south-eastern Mongolia. Zülegt fluorspar mine is located in the northern part of the sum. In 2009, its population was 2,176.

== Geography ==
Ikhkhet is the northern most district in the province.

== Administrative divisions ==
The district is divided into three bags, which are:

- Bayan
- Burdene
- Zülegt

== Notable natives ==
- Sharavyn Gungaadorj, the Prime Minister of Mongolia from March 21 to September 11, 1990, was born in Ikhkhet in 1935.
