= Dornogovi Province =

Province (aimag) of Mongolia

Dornogobi Province Дорноговь аймаг ᠳᠣᠷᠤᠨᠠᠭᠣᠪᠢᠠᠶᠢᠮᠠᠭ
- Province
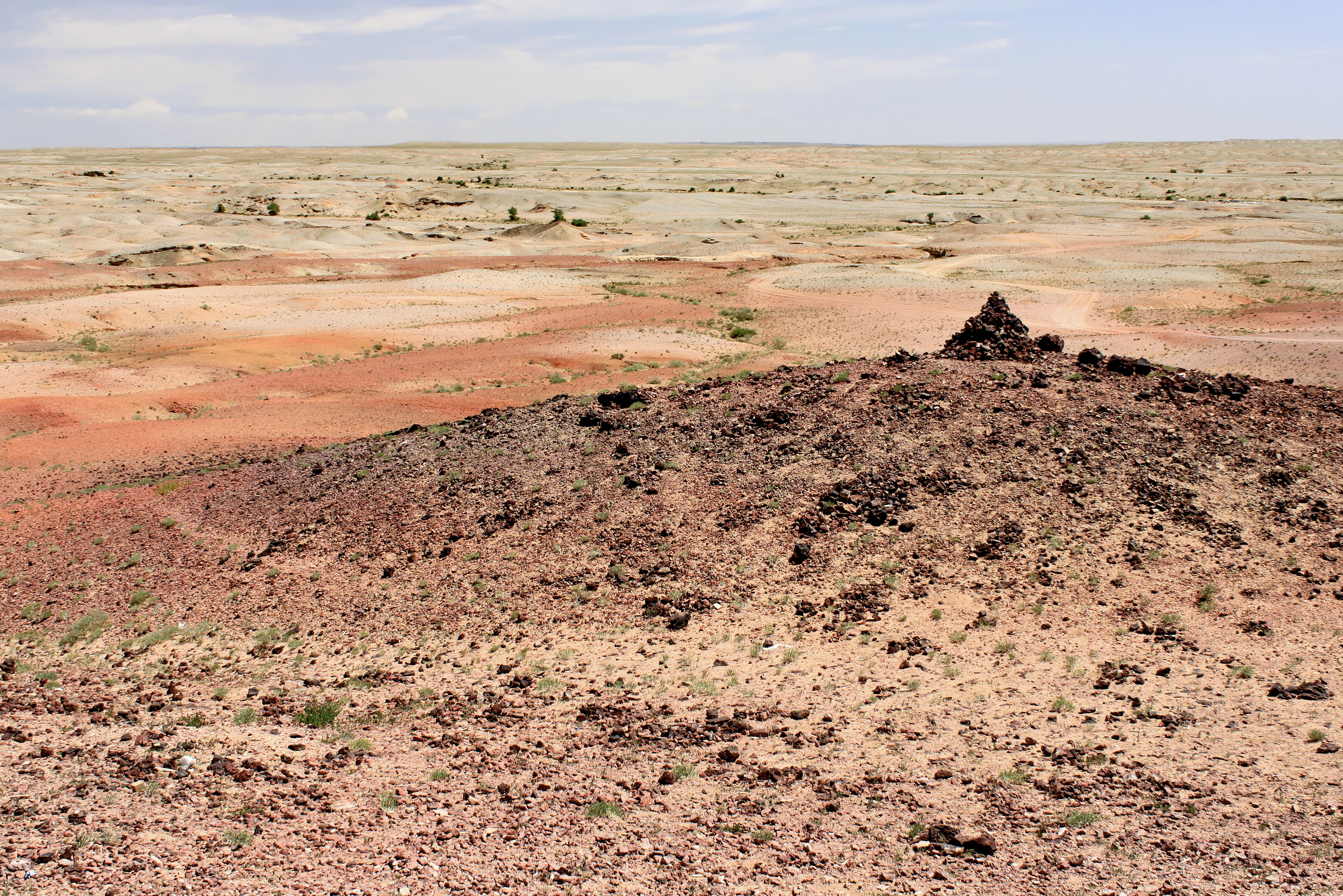

- Flag Coat of arms

- Coordinates: 44°53′N 110°09′E
- Country: Mongolia
- Established: 1931
- Capital: Sainshand

Area
  - Total: 109,472.30 km^{2} (42,267.49 sq mi)
- Elevation: 784 m (2,572 ft)

Population (2025)
  - Total: 73,970
  - Density: 0.6757/km^{2} (1.750/sq mi)

GDP
  - Total: MNT 656 billion US$ 0.2 billion (2022)
  - Per capita: MNT 9,112,070; US$ 2,917 (2022)
- Time zone: UTC+8
- Area code: +976 (0)152
- ISO 3166 code: MN-063
- Vehicle registration: ДГ_
- Website: dornogovi.gov.mn

Dornogovi (Mongolian: Дорноговь, East Gobi) is one of the 21 aimags (provinces) of Mongolia, located in the southeast of the country, bordering China's autonomous region of Inner Mongolia.

Dornogovi is located in the Gobi Desert, and frequent sand- and snow storms amplify the hard weather conditions of Mongolia. Temperatures can range from −40 °C (−40 °F) to 40 °C (104 °F) with ground temperatures as high as 60 °C or 140 °F.

Dornogovi has ample reserves of groundwater, but no lakes or rivers.

== Administrative subdivisions ==
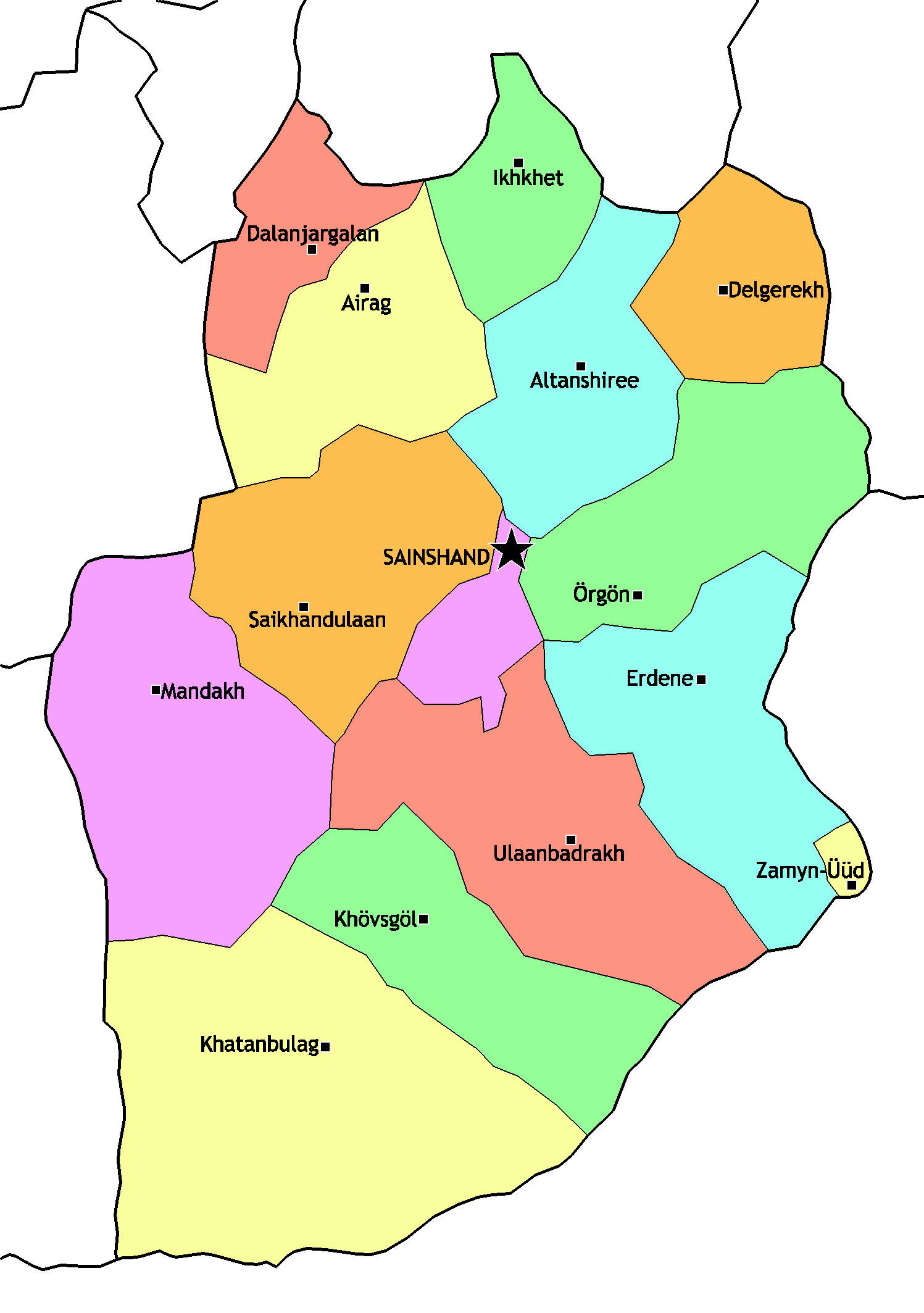
Sums of Dornogovi Aimag

Sums of Dornogovi Aimag
Sum	Mongolian	Population (2000)	Population (2006)	Population (2009)	Area (km^{2})	Density (/km^{2})	Sum centre population (2009)
Airag	Айраг	3,467	3,486	3,598	7,442.58	0.48	2,607
Altanshiree	Алтанширээ	1,547	1,422	1,306	7,225.71	0.18	370
Dalanjargalan	Даланжаргалан	2,332	2,479	2,554	4,045.90	0.63	726
Delgerekh	Дэлгэрэх	1,893	1,733	1,781	4,858.10	0.37	429
Erdene	Эрдэнэ	2,832	2,448	2,395	9,952.04	0.24	1,577
Ikhkhet	Иххэт	2,701	2,278	2,176	4,152.52	0.52	1,270^{*}
Khatanbulag	Хатанбулаг	3,362	3,082	2,985	18,669.37	0.16	603
Khövsgöl	Хөвсгөл	1,720	1,461	1,531	8,376.96	0.18	385
Mandakh	Мандах	1,905	1,648	1,528	12,660.61	0.12	366
Örgön	Өргөн	2,028	1,922	1,816	8,689.65	0.21	871
Saikhandulaan	Сайхандулаан	1,281	1,301	1,217	9,558.34	0.13	354
Sainshand	Сайншанд	18,290	19,548	20,480	2,342.80	8.74	18,747^{**}
Ulaanbadrakh	Улаанбадрах	1,730	1,550	1,543	11,370.92	0.14	367
Zamyn-Üüd	Замын-Үүд	5,486	9,665	12,823	486.80	26.34	12,823^{*}

^{*} - tosgon (urban-type settlement).
^{**} - The aimag capital Sainshand

== Demographics ==
In 2020, the majority of the religion of the residents is Buddhism (89.1%) followed by Shamans (6%), Christianity (2.2%) and other religions (2.8%).

== Economy ==
In 2018, the province contributed to 1.09% of the total national GDP of Mongolia.
