= Elections in Mongolia =

Elections in Mongolia are held at a national level to elect the head of state—the President of Mongolia—and the parliament—State Great Khural (Mongolian: Улсын Их Хурал). The president is directly elected for a six-year term, using the two-round system. Prior to 2021, the president served a single renewable term of four years.

The State Great Khural has 126 members (originally 76 seats prior to 2023) elected for a four-year term. The electoral system for parliamentary elections has changed throughout the years, leading to extreme shifts in political dynamics. Block voting from 26 multi-member districts were ratified first in 1992. It was later changed to first-past-the-post voting (FPTP) from 76 single-member districts in late 1996. Block voting was re-introduced in 2005. Further changes in 2011 enacted a parallel system, combining block vote and nationwide proportional representation. 48 seats were chosen via block vote, while remaining 28 seats were elected from closed party lists using the largest remainder method. However, the mixed system was changed in favour of FPTP voting in early 2016, which was then amended for block vote in 2019. Electoral changes were recently made in 2023, which expanded parliament from 76 to 126 seats and re-implemented parellel voting. Of the 126 seats, 78 were elected from 13 multi-member districts and 48 were elected via closed party list.

Mongolia also holds local elections nationwide during or after the parliamentary election cycle, with 8031 seats across 2395 constituencies in all 9 municipal districts, 21 provinces, and 331 sums (county) and the Citizens' Representatives Khurals (local governing councils) in a majoritarian system.

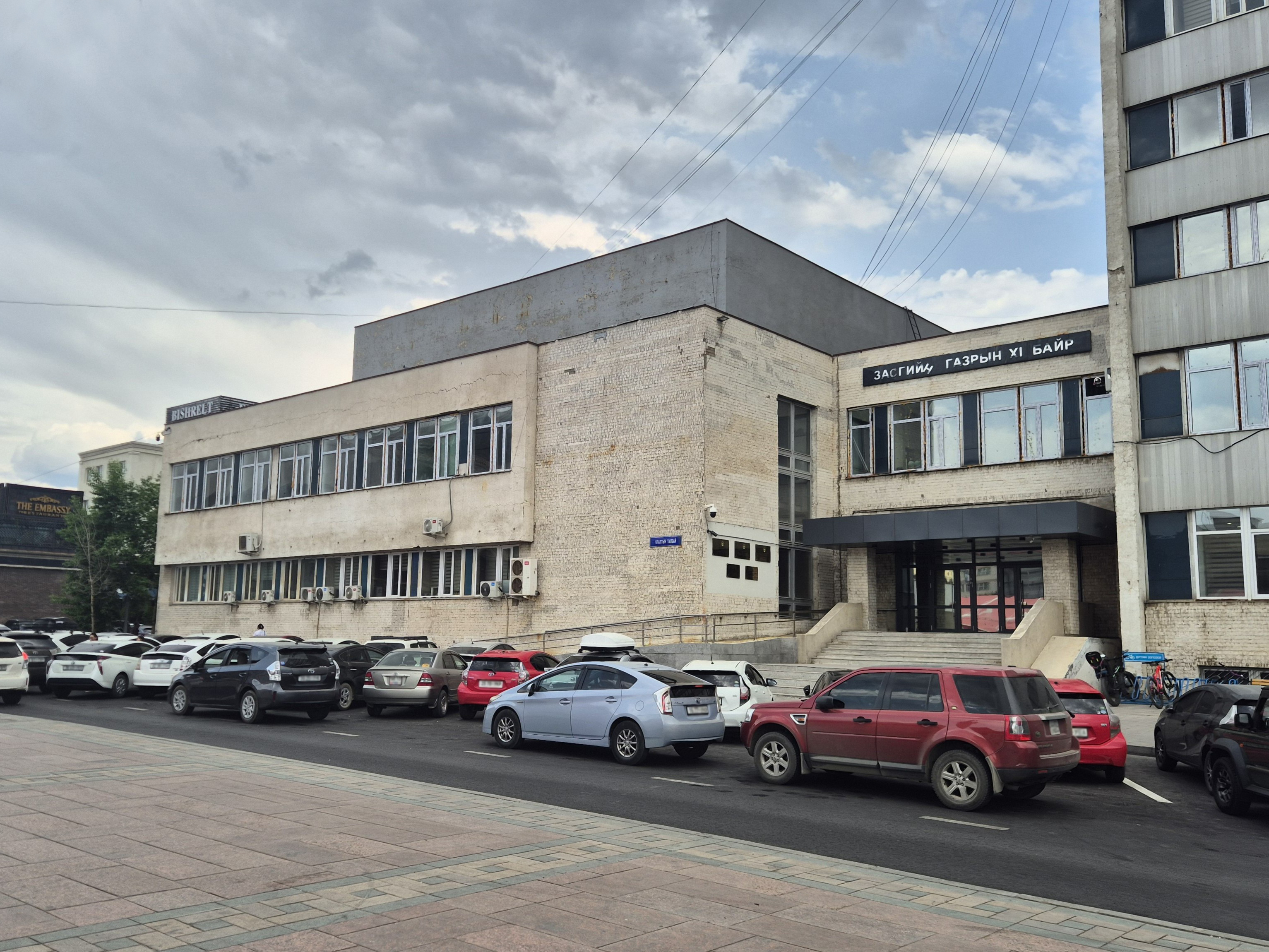
Headquarters of the General Election Commission in Ulaanbaatar.

== Voting and conduct ==
According to the Constitution of Mongolia, all citizens at least 18 years old and with full legal capacity have the right to vote. Voter registration in Mongolia isn't compulsory and is tasked by the Central Government Department. The General Election Commission (GEC), established on 10 April 1992 by the State Little Khural, is the country's election commission mandated to hold all elections and referendums. Electronic voting was first introduced in the 2012 parliamentary election. Since 2012, electronic voting machines (EVM) have been used in subsequent presidential, parliamentary, and local elections. Due to the use of EVMs, Mongolian nationals abroad were eligible to vote at their closest diplomatic offices. However, this right is only exercised during presidential elections or parliamentary elections with a party vote.

At polling stations, voters are verified by fingerprint. In the event the fingerprints are not recognisable, voters may still vote by showing their national identification card as long as they're registered at the polling station. Manual counts are conducted in polling stations to check the accuracy of the machines and to verify the final election results.

== Latest elections ==
=== 2021 presidential election ===
Second place by administrative divisions: Khürelsükh Enkhbat Erdene Blank

Polls opened at 07:00 in 2,087 polling stations across the country for the 2 million registered voters, with special measures in place due to the COVID-19 pandemic in Mongolia. Voting ended at 22:00. Khürelsükh and Erdene voted in Ulaanbaatar, while Enkhbat tested positive for COVID-19 and voted in the hospital.

Candidate	Party	Votes	%
Ukhnaagiin Khürelsükh	Mongolian People's Party	823,326	67.76
Dangaasürengiin Enkhbat	Right Person Electorate Coalition	246,968	20.33
Sodnomzunduin Erdene	Democratic Party	72,832	5.99
Blank votes		71,937	5.92
Total		1,215,063	100.00
Total votes		1,215,063	–
Registered voters/turnout		2,049,379	59.29
Source: General Election Commission

Vote share
Khürelsükh	67.76%
Enkhbat	20.33%
Erdene	5.99%
Blank votes	5.92%

Results of Khürelsükh by administrative divisions

Results of Enkhbat by administrative divisions

Results of Erdene by administrative divisions

=== By area ===
Subdivision	Ukhnaagiin Khürelsükh MPP		Dangaasürengiin Enkhbat RPEC		Sodnomzunduin Erdene DP	
Subdivision	Votes	%	Votes	%	Votes	%
Aimags of Mongolia
Arkhangai	23,870	69.85%	3,046	8.91%	6,186	18.10%
Bayan-Ölgii	29,474	81.53%	1,616	4.47%	2,636	7.29%
Bayankhongor	23,522	74.60%	2,507	7.95%	1,898	6.02%
Bulgan	17,825	78.34%	2,290	10.06%	1,401	6.16%
Govi-Altai	18,336	84.60%	1,640	7.57%	1,099	5.07%
Govisümber	5,032	76.87%	846	12.92%	414	6.32%
Dornogovi	20,434	74.62%	4,336	15.83%	1,476	5.39%
Dornod	21,291	73.98%	4,292	14.91%	1,433	4.98%
Dundgovi	12,786	79.06%	1,726	10.67%	856	5.29%
Zavkhan	22,058	76.21%	3,220	11.12%	1,915	6.62%
Övörkhangai	32,879	79.32%	4,284	10.33%	1,915	4.62%
Ömnögovi	17,870	74.16%	3,170	13.16	1,625	6.74%
Sükhbaatar	23,215	87.28%	1,356	5.10%	880	3.31%
Selenge	25,149	69.93%	5,901	16.41%	2,401	6.68%
Töv	26,481	78.38%	4,073	12.05%	1,560	4.62%
Uvs	23,642	77.49%	2,689	8.81%	1,063	3.48%
Khovd	24,366	73.96%	4,176	12.68%	3,349	10.17%
Khövsgöl	32,931	68.11%	7,937	16.42%	4,901	10.14%
Khentii	26,356	82.52%	2,393	7.49%	2,361	7.39%
Darkhan-Uul	24,714	67.46%	7,764	21.19%	1,628	4.44%
Orkhon	27,408	68.94%	7,962	20.03%	1,530	3.85%
Düüregs of Ulaanbaatar
Khan-Uul	55,183	68.67%	27,890	34.70%	4,063	5.06%
Baganuur	7,940	72.43%	1,920	17.52%	670	6.11%
Bagakhangai	1,492	84.53%	155	8.78%	65	3.68%
Bayanzürkh	82,796	59.32%	42,414	30.39%	5,627	4.03%
Nalaikh	10,309	72.51%	2,570	18.08%	667	4.69%
Sükhbaatar	32,710	56.74%	18,090	31.38%	3,193	5.54%
Chingeltei	35,830	61.69%	15,680	27.00%	2,757	4.75%
Bayangol	48,954	52.61%	30,249	32.51%	8,361	8.99%
Songino Khairkhan	79,244	67.34%	26,692	22.68%	4,742	4.03%
Overseas	1,175	21.10%	4,084	73.35%	160	2.87%
Total	823,326	67.76%	246,968	20.33%	72,832	5.99%

=== 2024 legislative election ===
Preliminary results showed the ruling Mongolia People's Party had won a narrow and reduced majority in the Khural, which allowed Prime Minister Luvsannamsrain Oyun-Erdene to publicly claim victory. The Democratic Party also gained 42 seats, an increase from the 2020 election. The full official results were presented by the GEC on 1 July 2024.

Party	Proportional			Constituency			Total seats	+/–
Party	Votes	%	Seats	Votes	%	Seats	Total seats	+/–
Mongolian People's Party	509,482	35.01	18	3,619,950	38.64	50	68	+6
Democratic Party	438,506	30.13	16	3,135,988	33.48	26	42	+31
HUN Party	151,111	10.38	6	636,648	6.80	2	8	+7
National Coalition	75,196	5.17	4	291,166	3.11	0	4	New
Civil Will–Green Party	73,006	5.02	4	269,582	2.88	0	4	+4
New United Coalition	69,682	4.79	0	255,847	2.73	0	0	New
Truth and Right Party	40,783	2.80	0	208,717	2.23	0	0	New
Civil Movement Party	20,443	1.40	0	153,615	1.64	0	0	New
Republican Party	19,635	1.35	0	116,561	1.24	0	0	New
The Civic Unity Party	13,733	0.94	0	86,083	0.92	0	0	New
People's Power Party	10,614	0.73	0	106,423	1.14	0	0	New
Good Democratic Citizens United Party	6,104	0.42	0	59,902	0.64	0	0	New
Motherland Party	5,621	0.39	0	52,803	0.56	0	0	New
Liberte Party	4,738	0.33	0	45,794	0.49	0	0	New
People's Majority Governance Party	3,619	0.25	0	31,025	0.33	0	0	0
For the Mongolian People Party	3,461	0.24	0	35,183	0.38	0	0	New
Mongolian Liberal Democratic Party	2,820	0.19	0	232	0.00	0	0	New
United Patriots Party	2,168	0.15	0	213	0.00	0	0	0
Mongolian Social Democratic Party	1,531	0.11	0	7,789	0.08	0	0	0
Mongol Conservative Party	1,485	0.10	0	21,177	0.23	0	0	New
Freedom Implementing Party	1,450	0.10	0	26,192	0.28	0	0	0
Independent				206,916	2.21	0	0	–1
Total	1,455,188	100.00	48	9,367,806	100.00	78	126	+50
Valid votes	1,455,188	99.47		1,441,825	99.33			
Invalid/blank votes	7,717	0.53		9,728	0.67			
Total votes	1,462,905	100.00		1,451,553	100.00			
Registered voters/turnout	2,094,733	69.84		2,097,961	69.19			
Source: General Election Commission

=== Results by constituency ===
Results by constituency

1st Constituency
Candidate	Party	Votes	%
Oyuunsaikhany Altangerel	Democratic Party	66,656	5.80
Sainkhüügiin Ganbaatar	Democratic Party	61,824	5.38
Batmönkhiin Battsetseg	Mongolian People's Party	60,610	5.27
Pürevbaataryn Mönkhtulga	Democratic Party	60,059	5.23
Dashdondogiin Ganbat	Democratic Party	58,263	5.07
Ganzorigiin Temüülen	Mongolian People's Party	58,228	5.07
Ganbatyn Khosbayar	Democratic Party	56,612	4.93
Damdinsürengiin Jargalsaikhan	Democratic Party	56,177	4.89
Davaagiin Tsogtbaatar	Democratic Party	55,935	4.87
Gombojavyn Zandanshatar	Mongolian People's Party	53,649	4.67
Amgalangiin Ad'yaasüren	Democratic Party	53,485	4.65
Dulamdorjiin Togtokhsüren	Mongolian People's Party	51,867	4.51
Batsuuriin Davaadalai	Mongolian People's Party	51,686	4.50
Sodnomyn Chinzorig	Mongolian People's Party	51,248	4.46
Enebishiin Bolorchuluun	Democratic Party	50,935	4.43
Gürsediin Saikhanbayar	Mongolian People's Party	49,296	4.29
Gochoogiin Ganbold	Mongolian People's Party	48,964	4.26
Ayuushiin Tsogtsetseg	Mongolian People's Party	48,661	4.23
Ayuurzanyn Otgonbaatar	Truth and Right Party	23,876	2.08
Tserendorjiin Dagvadorj	National Coalition	10,025	0.87
Otgonbaataryn Bilgüün	HUN Party	9,724	0.85
Tsolmongiin Mönkhbat	Independent	7,955	0.69
Erdene-Ochiryn Sodnomjamts	National Coalition	7,760	0.68
Sharav-Arildiigiin Mönkhbaatar	Truth and Right Party	4,493	0.39
Rentsendorjiin Oyuunbileg	National Coalition	3,966	0.35
Dagdangiin Odontungalag	National Coalition	3,726	0.32
Mönkhtogtokhyn Galmönkh	Truth and Right Party	3,609	0.31
Batsürengiin Urangoo	HUN Party	3,290	0.29
Perenlein Tamir	HUN Party	3,033	0.26
Gombodorjiin Enkh-Amgalan	Civil Movement Party	2,943	0.26
Ünenbuyangiin Gantig	HUN Party	2,770	0.24
Byambaakhüügiin Oyuunbileg	Truth and Right Party	2,726	0.24
Tömör-Ochiryn Mönkhnasan	New United Coalition	2,721	0.24
Dashkhüügiin Batmandakh	HUN Party	2,519	0.22
Baasansambuugiin Chinbaatar	New United Coalition	2,474	0.22
Jambalsürengiin Batzangia	Truth and Right Party	2,447	0.21
Tömör-Ochiryn Bulganmaa	HUN Party	2,403	0.21
Gankhuyagiin Odontsetseg	Truth and Right Party	2,305	0.20
Enkhbaataryn Mönkhtulga	Motherland Party	2,249	0.20
Nergüin Tüvshinmönkh	Civil Movement Party	2,123	0.18
Sosorbaramyn Ganbold	Civil Will–Green Party	2,062	0.18
Dolgorsürengiin Erdenebat	Truth and Right Party	2,002	0.17
Byambaagiin Buyanjargal	Civil Movement Party	1,990	0.17
Sükhbaataryn Bütemj	Civil Movement Party	1,896	0.16
Pürevragchaagiin Battulga	Civil Movement Party	1,854	0.16
Erdenebatyn Gan-Erdene	Civil Will–Green Party	1,839	0.16
Gend-Ochiryn Khayankhyarvaa	Civil Movement Party	1,798	0.16
Chagnaadorjiin Pürevsüren	Truth and Right Party	1,783	0.16
Chuluuntsetsegiin Gereltuyaa	Truth and Right Party	1,769	0.15
Ganbaataryn Bütemj	HUN Party	1,725	0.15
Chogsomyn Mönkh-Amgalan	HUN Party	1,693	0.15
Ölziipüreviin Shinekhüü	Civil Movement Party	1,672	0.15
Sosoryn Enkhbat	Civil Will–Green Party	1,641	0.14
Enkhtöriin Pagamjam	Civil Will–Green Party	1,590	0.14
Tsanjidyn Baldandorj	New United Coalition	1,522	0.13
Üdelmaagiin Erdenechimeg	Civil Will–Green Party	1,473	0.13
Ganpüreviin Dolgormaa	HUN Party	1,352	0.12
Dashzevegiin Bayarmaa	Civil Will–Green Party	1,238	0.11
Zinamideriin Bat-Erdene	People's Majority Rule Party	1,114	0.10
Batchuluuny Uranchimeg	People's Power Party	990	0.09
Bat-Ayuushiin Dugarmaa	Civil Will–Green Party	963	0.08
Nyam-Ochiryn Nasanbaatar	Motherland Party	935	0.08
Gombosürengiin Düürenbileg	Republican Party	933	0.08
Davaabayaryn Nyambayar	Motherland Party	911	0.08
Tüvshintöriin Tüvshinjargal	Citizen Participation Union Party	905	0.08
Erdenebatyn Enkhbat	For the Mongolian People Party	862	0.07
Myagmardorjiin Batmönkh	Republican Party	824	0.07
Dembereldalain Tsegmed	Mongolian Conservative Party	718	0.06
Myagmarpüreviin Osorjamaa	Citizen Participation Union Party	713	0.06
Dashbazaryn Otgontsetseg	Freedom Alliance Party	705	0.06
Batmönkhiin Oyuun-Erdene	For the Mongolian People Party	635	0.06
Üüriintuyaagiin Amarjargal	People's Power Party	584	0.05
Davkharbayaryn Khurtsbaatar	Freedom Alliance Party	566	0.05
Shinedentseliin Altansükh	For the Mongolian People Party	477	0.04
Mijiddorjiin Battulga	Good Democratic Citizens United Party	460	0.04
Batbayaryn Ankhbayar	Freedom Alliance Party	456	0.04
Banzaryn Javzmaa	Good Democratic Citizens United Party	415	0.04
Pürevjambyn Sanchir	Citizen Participation Union Party	373	0.03
Avirmediin Üürtsaikh	Good Democratic Citizens United Party	326	0.03
Tserenbaljiryn Erdenebaatar	Good Democratic Citizens United Party	280	0.02
Total		1,149,336	100.00
Valid votes		127,163	99.46
Invalid/blank votes		687	0.54
Total votes		127,850	100.00
Registered voters/turnout		187,668	68.13

2nd Constituency
Candidate	Party	Votes	%
Sandagiin Byambatsogt	Mongolian People's Party	79,826	5.66
Odongiin Tsogtgerel	Democratic Party	75,927	5.38
Dashzegviin Amarbayasgalan	Mongolian People's Party	74,199	5.26
Bökhchuluuny Pürevdorj	Democratic Party	74,152	5.26
Battogtokhyn Choijilsüren	Mongolian People's Party	73,280	5.20
Banzragchiin Tüvshin	Democratic Party	69,829	4.95
Ochirbatyn Amgalanbaatar	Democratic Party	67,597	4.79
Batjargalyn Zayaabal	Mongolian People's Party	67,321	4.77
Zagdjavyn Mendsaikhan	Mongolian People's Party	66,594	4.72
Enkhbatyn Bolormaa	Mongolian People's Party	64,838	4.60
Tsedendambyn Tserenpuntsag	Mongolian People's Party	64,537	4.58
Zagdkhüügiin Narantuyaa	Democratic Party	59,284	4.20
Shirnenbanidyn Adishaa	Democratic Party	58,823	4.17
Baljinnyamyn Bayarsaikhan	Mongolian People's Party	58,788	4.17
Chimediin Khürelbaatar	Mongolian People's Party	56,388	4.00
Sereejavyn Enkhbold	Mongolian People's Party	55,107	3.91
Tsogtoogiin Odontungalag	Democratic Party	51,204	3.63
Daimaagiin Batsaikhan	Democratic Party	50,612	3.59
Dogsomyn Battsogt	Democratic Party	50,096	3.55
Norovyn Tegshbayar	Democratic Party	38,629	2.74
Samandyn Javkhlan	Republican Party	18,883	1.34
Ad'yaabaljiryn Sanjmyatav	Independent	6,071	0.43
Dorjiin Önörjargal	HUN Party	5,568	0.39
Khiimorsangiin Bolor-Erdene	HUN Party	5,109	0.36
Khumbagaryn Batmend	New United Coalition	4,357	0.31
Tseren-Ochiryn Batdorj	National Coalition	4,325	0.31
Ganbatyn Bayarmaa	HUN Party	4,153	0.29
Damdiny Buyanbal	HUN Party	3,892	0.28
Nyamaagiin Tseveen	National Coalition	3,374	0.24
Ganboldyn Bayartogtokh	Civil Will–Green Party	3,322	0.24
Jarantain Amartaivan	New United Coalition	2,822	0.20
Sorogiin Soyombo	HUN Party	2,737	0.19
Doljingiin Otgonbayar	Civil Will–Green Party	2,594	0.18
Battulgyn Enkhzayaa	HUN Party	2,447	0.17
Altangereliin Dorjdagva	Truth and Right Party	2,445	0.17
Davaatserengiin Avirmed	National Coalition	2,443	0.17
Baljinnyamyn Amaraa	HUN Party	2,282	0.16
Khadbaataryn Naranzayaa	Civil Will–Green Party	2,196	0.16
Ochirbatyn Altansükh	Civil Movement Party	2,042	0.14
Gantulgyn Khiimorisan	Independent	1,957	0.14
Jambaldorjiin Otgonbayar	New United Coalition	1,916	0.14
Chimidiin Mönkhjargal	New United Coalition	1,825	0.13
Dashravdangiin Altansükh	Civil Movement Party	1,802	0.13
Tüvshindüürenbayaryn Tsolmonsaikhan	New United Coalition	1,795	0.13
Dorjpalamyn Mönkhbayar	Independent	1,765	0.13
Tsogoogiin Möngöntulga	Civil Will–Green Party	1,722	0.12
Baryn Batsuuri	Civil Will–Green Party	1,674	0.12
Magsarjavyn Byambadorj	Republican Party	1,624	0.12
Batnasangiin Battogtokh	Truth and Right Party	1,597	0.11
Batsaikhany Khash-Erdene	HUN Party	1,531	0.11
Chimeddorjiin Yerööltüvshin	People's Majority Rule Party	1,512	0.11
Narantsetsegiin Davaanyam	National Coalition	1,494	0.11
Gankhuyagiin Budnyam	Truth and Right Party	1,465	0.10
Namjiljavyn Sandag	Civil Movement Party	1,461	0.10
Myangandashiin Byambadorj	HUN Party	1,461	0.10
Tsengeliin Bat-Erdene	Independent	1,459	0.10
Batsaikhany Mönkhtsetseg	Freedom Implementing Party	1,454	0.10
Tulgaagiin Galbadrakh	Republican Party	1,432	0.10
Oyuunbaataryn Nyamdorj	Truth and Right Party	1,427	0.10
Davaanyamyn Batzorigt	Civil Movement Party	1,372	0.10
Choijilsürengiin Bat-Erdene	Republican Party	1,303	0.09
Jamsrangiin Tserenchimed	Civil Movement Party	1,218	0.09
Erdenebaataryn Ganbold	Civil Movement Party	1,148	0.08
Dorjiin Chingeel Baatar	Civil Movement Party	1,121	0.08
Jamsranjavyn Mönkhbayar	Motherland Party	1,088	0.08
Shartolgoin Odkhüü	Civil Movement Party	1,067	0.08
Darisürengiin Tsogjargal	Motherland Party	1,049	0.07
Gantulgyn Enkhbayar	Independent	1,031	0.07
Tserenpiliin Odgerel	Civil Movement Party	1,004	0.07
Gombosürengiin Sarantuyaa	Truth and Right Party	991	0.07
Lkhagvajavyn Ganzorig	Independent	989	0.07
Ganboldyn Pürevragchaa	Independent	942	0.07
Ganbaataryn Namjilmaa	Truth and Right Party	902	0.06
Buyanjargalyn Lkhagvasüren	Independent	895	0.06
Batmönkhiin Tögsbayar	Freedom Implementing Party	890	0.06
Bayarsaikhany Pürevsüren	Truth and Right Party	888	0.06
Pürveegiin Ganbold	Independent	879	0.06
Tömöriin Batsükh	Truth and Right Party	826	0.06
Batkholboogiin Nyamdolgor	Citizen Participation Union Party	825	0.06
Tulgaagiin Ariuntungalag	Good Democratic Citizens United Party	818	0.06
Sharavyn Erdenetsetseg	People's Power Party	817	0.06
Tsedendambyn Batlkhagva	Civil Will–Green Party	781	0.06
Banzragchiin Byambadorj	Civil Movement Party	774	0.05
Enkh-Amgalangiin Baljinnyam	Freedom Alliance Party	727	0.05
Choijiljavyn Binder'yaa	Truth and Right Party	721	0.05
Jamsranchimediin Batsaikhan	Independent	704	0.05
Ideshiin Tungalagtuyaa	For the Mongolian People Party	699	0.05
Garmaagiin Erdenebat	People's Power Party	684	0.05
Dügersürengiin Enkhbayar	Independent	683	0.05
Battömöriin Batbayar	Independent	670	0.05
Dorjiin Möngöntsetseg	Good Democratic Citizens United Party	661	0.05
Naranbaataryn Choijildagva	Motherland Party	655	0.05
Badamdorjiin Baasankhüü	Independent	643	0.05
Baasandorjiin Bileg	Freedom Implementing Party	638	0.05
Lkhagvasürengiin Tömörsükh	Citizen Participation Union Party	626	0.04
Vanchigiin Tömörbaatar	Mongolian Conservative Party	604	0.04
Zambyn Batmönkh	Independent	580	0.04
Tulgaagiin Ankhbayar	Freedom Alliance Party	576	0.04
Ganjuuryn Mönkhtsetseg	Citizen Participation Union Party	554	0.04
Mandakhyn Enkhmörön	Freedom Alliance Party	505	0.04
Dalantain Bayanjargal	Truth and Right Party	501	0.04
Sanjmyatavyn Saruul-Erdene	People's Majority Rule Party	454	0.03
Sengesambyn Mönkh-Ochir	Citizen Participation Union Party	453	0.03
Yadamdorjiin Bat-Erdene	People's Majority Rule Party	451	0.03
Zandangiin Enkh-Orgil	Freedom Alliance Party	443	0.03
Tsesmaagiin Ganbat	Good Democratic Citizens United Party	423	0.03
Bayarsaikhany Anundari	Good Democratic Citizens United Party	418	0.03
Nyalkhain Oyuundalai	Citizen Participation Union Party	409	0.03
Khuvkhüü Dobkhardtyn Tümenkhishig	Mongolian Conservative Party	364	0.03
Ishdorjiin Davaadulam	For the Mongolian People Party	356	0.03
Batnasangiin Mönkh-Altai	Good Democratic Citizens United Party	351	0.02
Myagmaryn Nyamgerel	Good Democratic Citizens United Party	350	0.02
Javjingiin Nyamdorj	People's Majority Rule Party	272	0.02
Bazarjavyn Davaadorj	Good Democratic Citizens United Party	201	0.01
Total		1,410,460	100.00
Valid votes		140,704	99.71
Invalid/blank votes		403	0.29
Total votes		141,107	100.00
Registered voters/turnout		192,200	73.42

3rd Constituency
Candidate	Party	Votes	%
Khajyekbyeriin Jangabyl	Mongolian People's Party	25,138	18.14
Tilyeukhany Aubakir	Mongolian People's Party	23,772	17.15
Bulany Byeisyen	Democratic Party	21,454	15.48
Sharivyn Jandos	Democratic Party	18,160	13.10
Khuzkyeigiin Darmyen	Democratic Party	17,518	12.64
Zulpain Batyrbyek	Mongolian People's Party	16,986	12.26
Dalyeliin Bauyrjan	Independent	8,880	6.41
Birdkhany Mukhit	HUN Party	1,161	0.84
Battulgyn Enkh-Uyanga	Truth and Right Party	1,154	0.83
Kabiliin Yerjan	National Coalition	1,036	0.75
Tsonkhiogiin Tsolmon	HUN Party	665	0.48
Tursyny Güljan	Civil Will–Green Party	362	0.26
Khalimjany Bagdat	Civil Will–Green Party	317	0.23
Nasiryn Samat	New United Coalition	317	0.23
Zakhany Daulyetbyek	New United Coalition	285	0.21
Khajymuratyn Nurgül	Civil Will–Green Party	245	0.18
Natsagdorjiin Enkhbaatar	Civil Movement Party	240	0.17
Batdelgeriin Zagdzüsem	Civil Movement Party	231	0.17
Boldbaataryn Naranbadral	Civil Movement Party	225	0.16
Marjany Bolat	HUN Party	133	0.10
Pürevjavyn Erdenetsogt	Good Democratic Citizens United Party	114	0.08
Mavlyetyn Tölyegyen	Republican Party	110	0.08
Shökyeshiin Asylbyek	Freedom Alliance Party	79	0.06
Total		138,582	100.00
Valid votes		46,080	99.63
Invalid/blank votes		171	0.37
Total votes		46,251	100.00
Registered voters/turnout		62,896	73.54

4th Constituency
Candidate	Party	Votes	%
Khaltmaagiin Battulga	Democratic Party	60,933	5.92
Luvsantserengiin Enkh-Amgalan	Mongolian People's Party	59,728	5.80
Dambyn Batlut	Mongolian People's Party	58,657	5.70
Bat-Ölziin Bat-Erdene	Mongolian People's Party	53,474	5.20
Dorjsürengiin Üüriintuyaa	Mongolian People's Party	51,805	5.03
Lkhagvyn Mönkhbaatar	Mongolian People's Party	49,182	4.78
Jadambyn Bat-Erdene	Mongolian People's Party	48,198	4.68
Tserenpiliin Davaasüren	Mongolian People's Party	47,557	4.62
Batbayaryn Ariun-Erdene	Democratic Party	43,885	4.26
Lamjavyn Gündalai	People's Power Party	42,919	4.17
Jalbasürengiin Batzandan	Democratic Party	42,683	4.15
Günshiriin Möngönkhuyag	Democratic Party	40,183	3.90
Khaichaagiin Batsaikhan	Democratic Party	40,162	3.90
Batsükhiin Bayarmagnai	Mongolian People's Party	39,800	3.87
Dorligiin Ösökhbayar	Democratic Party	38,449	3.74
Khash-Erdeniin Erdenebaatar	Democratic Party	37,132	3.61
Gungaajavyn Tserendolgor	Democratic Party	33,045	3.21
Erdenebilegiin Batkhishig	New United Coalition	12,066	1.17
Batchuluuny Mönkhnasan	Independent	11,046	1.07
Batmönkhiin Mönkhbold	HUN Party	9,402	0.91
Dashdavaagiin Ganbold	National Coalition	9,007	0.88
Bayaraagiin Zundui	HUN Party	8,669	0.84
Shinebayaryn Zulbadam	Independent	8,531	0.83
Enkh-Amgalangiin Sarantsetseg	National Coalition	8,026	0.78
Ganzorigiin Gankhuyag	New United Coalition	7,671	0.75
Tömörbaataryn Ochirdari	HUN Party	7,284	0.71
Bavuugiin Chinzorig	National Coalition	7,070	0.69
Ganbaataryn Batbaatar	Truth and Right Party	6,627	0.64
Erdenetögsiin Enkhchimeg	HUN Party	6,074	0.59
Munadembereliin Sambuunyam	People's Power Party	5,542	0.54
Biraagiin Bat-Erdene	Civil Will–Green Party	5,447	0.53
Mashiny Elbegzayaa	HUN Party	5,317	0.52
Tsogtyn Bataa	Independent	4,726	0.46
Tsagaantsoojiin Enkhbat	HUN Party	4,571	0.44
Erdenebayaryn Tungalag	HUN Party	4,477	0.44
Battulgyn Bolormaa	Truth and Right Party	4,381	0.43
Dashtserengiin Nominzayaa	People's Power Party	4,308	0.42
Dashnyamyn Batbayar	Independent	4,228	0.41
Gürjavyn Batpürev	Civil Movement Party	4,163	0.40
Bayarsaikhany Byambajav	People's Power Party	4,027	0.39
Dashbaldangiin Batbayar	New United Coalition	4,007	0.39
Batkhüügiin Batjargal	People's Power Party	3,763	0.37
Dorjiin Amartüvshin	People's Power Party	3,718	0.36
Bat-Erdeniin Ariunzayaa	People's Power Party	3,706	0.36
Balsanjavyn Batbileg	Civil Will–Green Party	3,653	0.35
Badarchiin Erdenebat	Motherland Party	3,495	0.34
Tümenbayaryn Saruultungalag	New United Coalition	3,269	0.32
Ayuulgüin Ariunbold	New United Coalition	3,240	0.31
Baldandorjiin Bat-Uul	Civil Movement Party	3,092	0.30
Nyamsürengiin Khandsüren	Civil Will–Green Party	2,953	0.29
Otgondorjiin Sanjaasüren	Truth and Right Party	2,953	0.29
Gonchigsürengiin Enkhbayar	Republican Party	2,525	0.25
Jam'yandorjiin Zolzayaa	Truth and Right Party	2,513	0.24
Püreviin Ganbat	Civil Movement Party	2,482	0.24
Namnansürengiin Serjmyatav	Civil Movement Party	2,290	0.22
Davaajavyn Batchimeg	Citizen Participation Union Party	2,143	0.21
Davaasürengiin Tsogt-Erdene	Civil Movement Party	2,117	0.21
Jamsrangiin Ider	New United Coalition	2,008	0.20
Tömörbaataryn Amraa	Civil Will–Green Party	1,939	0.19
Puntsagdorjiin Damdindorj	Civil Movement Party	1,910	0.19
Tömör-Ochiryn Ganbat	Motherland Party	1,859	0.18
Bataagiin Gantulga	Freedom Implementing Party	1,838	0.18
Setenjavyn Ürelpürev	New United Coalition	1,794	0.17
Gombosürengiin Bayanjargal	Civil Movement Party	1,790	0.17
Chogsomjavyn Enkhbold	Civil Movement Party	1,758	0.17
Tserenbatyn Jimbeegalsan	People's Power Party	1,661	0.16
Tsetsgeegiin Odonchimeg	Good Democratic Citizens United Party	1,625	0.16
Erdenebilegiin Oyuun-Erdene	Freedom Alliance Party	1,528	0.15
Davaajavyn Ölzii-Orshikh	Citizen Participation Union Party	1,399	0.14
Lkhagvyn Saranchimeg	Citizen Participation Union Party	1,281	0.12
Dagvajamtsyn Sarantuyaa	Good Democratic Citizens United Party	1,235	0.12
Rentsendorjiin Galbadrakh	For the Mongolian People Party	1,124	0.11
Byambajavyn Sükhbold	For the Mongolian People Party	1,107	0.11
Tömörbaataryn Oyuunbolor	Freedom Alliance Party	1,055	0.10
Tömöriin Erdenetsetseg	Mongolian Conservative Party	1,028	0.10
Chimiddorjiin Chimid-Ochir	Motherland Party	923	0.09
Batmönkhiin Ayuush	Citizen Participation Union Party	844	0.08
Amgalangiin Batbileg	People's Majority Rule Party	797	0.08
Giragiin Niislelkhüü	People's Majority Rule Party	796	0.08
Delgeriin Narmandakh	For the Mongolian People Party	777	0.08
Iderbatyn Biligsaikhan	Freedom Alliance Party	754	0.07
Luvsanjambaagiin Mönkhtör	Mongolian Conservative Party	745	0.07
Baldangiin Bayasgalan	Mongolian Conservative Party	675	0.07
Galbadrakhyn Altanshagai	Citizen Participation Union Party	663	0.06
Khurmashiin Baasansüren	Citizen Participation Union Party	661	0.06
Sanjaasürengiin Pürevsüren	Good Democratic Citizens United Party	562	0.05
Ganshiremiin Nordod	People's Majority Rule Party	525	0.05
Total		1,029,032	100.00
Valid votes		128,125	99.52
Invalid/blank votes		619	0.48
Total votes		128,744	100.00
Registered voters/turnout		193,183	66.64

5th Constituency
Candidate	Party	Votes	%
Boldyn Javkhlan	Mongolian People's Party	62,898	4.89
Tsevegdorjiin Tuvaan	Democratic Party	60,644	4.72
Dalain Batbayar	Democratic Party	53,903	4.19
Jadambyn Enkhbayar	Mongolian People's Party	53,306	4.15
Buyaagiin Tulga	Mongolian People's Party	50,017	3.89
Gongoryn Damdinnyam	Mongolian People's Party	49,307	3.84
Sükhbaataryn Erdenebold	Democratic Party	47,892	3.73
Sürenjavyn Lündeg	Mongolian People's Party	46,712	3.64
Chinbatyn Undram	Mongolian People's Party	44,925	3.50
Jigjidiin Batjargal	Mongolian People's Party	44,775	3.48
Batchuluuny Tsogtgerel	Mongolian People's Party	43,223	3.36
Nemekheegiin Odongua	Democratic Party	40,617	3.16
Dondogdorjiin Erdenebat	Democratic Party	40,270	3.13
Dombongiin Üüriintuyaa	Democratic Party	39,908	3.11
Deremiin Erdenesuvd	Democratic Party	39,687	3.09
Natsagdorjiin Lkhagvadorj	Mongolian People's Party	39,643	3.09
Damdinsürengiin Önörbolor	Mongolian People's Party	39,394	3.07
Dulamsürengiin Dorjpürev	Democratic Party	37,281	2.90
Radnaagiin Batjargal	Democratic Party	36,584	2.85
Lkhasürengiin Odbayar	Democratic Party	33,937	2.64
Magsarjavyn Ochirbat	HUN Party	15,209	1.18
Khashbaataryn Tsagaanbaatar	Civil Will–Green Party	14,639	1.14
Lkhagvasürengiin Bayartulga	National Coalition	12,323	0.96
Pürevdorjiin Erdenebat	New United Coalition	12,226	0.95
Ganbürgediin Gantuyaa	HUN Party	12,000	0.93
Gongoryn Otgontuyaa	HUN Party	10,351	0.81
Chuluunbatyn Tsog-Erdene	HUN Party	10,294	0.80
Otgonkhüügiin Bolor-Erdene	National Coalition	10,016	0.78
Monkhoryn Törtogtokh	Independent	9,559	0.74
Dagvadorjiin Gantuul	Independent	9,497	0.74
Batsaikhany Nyambayar	Truth and Right Party	9,316	0.72
Shoovdoryn Barkhasbadi	HUN Party	8,366	0.65
Lkhagvyn Jambaa	HUN Party	7,483	0.58
Agvaansamdangiin Batsükh	New United Coalition	7,384	0.57
Davaagiin Bayasgalan	New United Coalition	6,790	0.53
Lkhagvaagiin Oyuunchimeg	New United Coalition	6,461	0.50
Janyn Ganbaatar	Independent	6,389	0.50
Luvsangiin Ganbold	Independent	6,376	0.50
Donoloin Badamkhand	HUN Party	6,289	0.49
Dashpuntsagiin Khishigjargal	National Coalition	6,214	0.48
Baataryn Undrakh-Od	National Coalition	5,991	0.47
Lkhasürengiin Choi-Ish	National Coalition	5,948	0.46
Baastyn Erdenebolor	National Coalition	5,833	0.45
Baldangiin Ganbaatar	Civil Will–Green Party	5,683	0.44
Pürevtserengiin Undram	HUN Party	5,474	0.43
Oidovyn Tsetsegmaa	Truth and Right Party	5,407	0.42
Tovuudorjiin Nasanjargal	National Coalition	5,401	0.42
Saranbaataryn Atartsetseg	Civil Will–Green Party	5,088	0.40
Sharavyn Batkhishig	Civil Will–Green Party	4,858	0.38
Mergenbilegiin Soyol	HUN Party	4,737	0.37
Ünenbürengiin Myagmarjav	Civil Movement Party	4,621	0.36
Shaizadagiin Galam	HUN Party	4,602	0.36
Khaltaryn Boldmandal	National Coalition	4,013	0.31
Batboldyn Byambabaatar	Truth and Right Party	3,929	0.31
Rinchindorjiin Ariunsanaa	Civil Will–Green Party	3,775	0.29
Ochirbatyn Nergüi	Civil Will–Green Party	3,545	0.28
Batsaikhany Chinbat	Truth and Right Party	3,520	0.27
Tsend-Ayuushiin Mönkhjargal	Civil Will–Green Party	3,504	0.27
Tsedeviin Ölziitogtokh	Civil Movement Party	3,486	0.27
Ninagiin Soronzonbayar	Republican Party	3,445	0.27
Manakhüügiin Ganbat	Civil Movement Party	3,399	0.26
Sükhbaataryn Batbayar	Motherland Party	3,340	0.26
Lamkhüügiin Naranchimeg	Republican Party	3,298	0.26
Batsaikhany Odgerel	Truth and Right Party	3,296	0.26
Urtnasangiin Baatarkhuyag	Civil Will–Green Party	3,244	0.25
Bayanmönkhiin Baljinnyam	Motherland Party	3,223	0.25
Janchivyn Tsendsüren	Civil Movement Party	3,098	0.24
Soronzonboldyn Bolorchuluun	Civil Movement Party	3,032	0.24
Batbayaryn Davaajargal	Citizen Participation Union Party	2,934	0.23
Chimeddorjiin Erdenebat	Civil Movement Party	2,912	0.23
Balchindorjiin Enkhsaikhan	Mongolian Conservative Party	2,660	0.21
Badralyn Khorolgarav	Truth and Right Party	2,654	0.21
Radnaagiin Ulambadrakh	Civil Movement Party	2,605	0.20
Choijingiin Ganchimeg	Motherland Party	2,375	0.18
Gochoogiin Natsagdorj	Civil Movement Party	2,361	0.18
Mönkhbayaryn Amarsanaa	For the Mongolian People Party	2,234	0.17
Sandagdorjiin Soyolbaatar	Civil Movement Party	2,224	0.17
Dorjiin Damdinsüren	Freedom Implementing Party	2,016	0.16
Batboldyn Telmüün	Good Democratic Citizens United Party	1,969	0.15
Batkhüügiin Bayarchimeg	People's Power Party	1,968	0.15
Namdagiin Naranbaatar	Citizen Participation Union Party	1,915	0.15
Tsedendambyn Enkhsaikhan	Civil Movement Party	1,903	0.15
Ochirbatyn Itgelsüren	Freedom Alliance Party	1,857	0.14
Batzorigiin Uuganbayar	Freedom Alliance Party	1,844	0.14
Dembereliin Bayaraa	Motherland Party	1,807	0.14
Altankhuyagiin Möngönshagai	Motherland Party	1,778	0.14
Batkhuyagiin Anar	People's Power Party	1,773	0.14
Dulmaagiin Uuganbayar	Citizen Participation Union Party	1,713	0.13
Gantömöriin Tungalag	Citizen Participation Union Party	1,639	0.13
Banzragchiin Ganbold	Freedom Implementing Party	1,625	0.13
Darkhanbayaryn Amartüvshin	Freedom Implementing Party	1,531	0.12
Tsedengiin Enkhtuyaa	Good Democratic Citizens United Party	1,478	0.12
Bayandalain Mönkhtenger	People's Power Party	1,350	0.11
Püreviin Bold	People's Majority Rule Party	1,332	0.10
Gankhuyagiin Sarantsetseg	People's Majority Rule Party	1,242	0.10
Möngönzagasyn Erdenebat	Good Democratic Citizens United Party	1,195	0.09
Tsogtbayaryn Tungalagbolor	People's Power Party	1,180	0.09
Bayarsaikhany Tsengünjav	Freedom Alliance Party	1,102	0.09
Batchuluuny Bars	People's Power Party	1,091	0.08
Dulmaagiin Ariuntuyaa	For the Mongolian People Party	1,071	0.08
Bazargüriin Ariunbold	Good Democratic Citizens United Party	1,044	0.08
Nyamaabazaryn Mönkhtuyaa	People's Power Party	1,009	0.08
Vanchingiin Narantsetseg	For the Mongolian People Party	989	0.08
Chuluuny Iderbaatar	Freedom Implementing Party	958	0.07
Namsrain Erdenestsatsral	Citizen Participation Union Party	927	0.07
Mönkhtömöriin Ariunzayaa	People's Power Party	913	0.07
Battömöriin Baigalimaa	For the Mongolian People Party	907	0.07
Zorigtyn Batüd	Citizen Participation Union Party	900	0.07
Sükhbaataryn Javzandulam	Freedom Implementing Party	840	0.07
Enebishiin Ölziisaruul	For the Mongolian People Party	804	0.06
Pürevdalain Enkh-Amgalan	People's Majority Rule Party	787	0.06
Volodyagiin Badamkhand	People's Majority Rule Party	758	0.06
Bayartsaikhany Byambagerel	Citizen Participation Union Party	753	0.06
Bürengiin Delgerekh	For the Mongolian People Party	657	0.05
Dondogiin Dariimaa	People's Power Party	628	0.05
Denzengiin Chuluunchimeg	People's Majority Rule Party	627	0.05
Tsedengiin Sergelentuyaa	For the Mongolian People Party	493	0.04
Lkhagvadorjiin Byaraabazar	People's Power Party	412	0.03
Tsogtoogiin Tserendolgor	For the Mongolian People Party	351	0.03
Total		1,284,990	100.00
Valid votes		127,950	99.44
Invalid/blank votes		724	0.56
Total votes		128,674	100.00
Registered voters/turnout		193,635	66.45

6th Constituency
Candidate	Party	Votes	%
Luvsannamsrain Oyun-Erdene	Mongolian People's Party	55,469	8.06
Myagmarsürengiin Badamsüren	Mongolian People's Party	46,667	6.78
Tsagaankhüügiin Iderbat	Mongolian People's Party	45,777	6.65
Ukhnaagiin Otgonbayar	Mongolian People's Party	43,724	6.35
Lkhagvasürengiin Soronzonbold	Mongolian People's Party	43,400	6.30
Shinebayaryn Byambasüren	Democratic Party	43,047	6.25
Möngöntsogiin Gankhüleg	Mongolian People's Party	42,248	6.14
Erkhembaataryn Tömörbaatar	Democratic Party	41,601	6.04
Pürev-Ochiryn Anujin	Mongolian People's Party	40,443	5.87
Törmönkhiin Pürevkhatan	Democratic Party	38,915	5.65
Nayantain Ganibal	Democratic Party	37,630	5.47
Sükhbaataryn Tömörkhüü	Democratic Party	36,239	5.26
Demberelvaanchigiin Baldan	Democratic Party	28,408	4.13
Shagdaryn Batdelger	Democratic Party	27,090	3.94
Lkhamjavyn Batjav	Independent	23,562	3.42
Pürevgereliin Gerelbaatar	Independent	8,883	1.29
Chuluuny Erdenebat	National Coalition	7,831	1.14
Enkhjargalyn Undarmaa	National Coalition	6,223	0.90
Galsandorjiin Solongo	Truth and Right Party	6,080	0.88
Erdenebaataryn Zayagegee	National Coalition	4,053	0.59
Damdinsürengiin Enkhbayar	HUN Party	3,727	0.54
Törboldyn Bat-Orgil	National Coalition	3,230	0.47
Lkhagvyn Lkhagvasüren	HUN Party	2,624	0.38
Enkhtöriin Pürevsüren	Civil Will–Green Party	2,454	0.36
Arslanbaataryn Arvinjargal	HUN Party	2,356	0.34
Ochirsükhiin Odjargal	Independent	2,276	0.33
Delgermaagiin Solongo	Motherland Party	2,071	0.30
Sharavdorjiin Byambatogtokh	National Coalition	1,992	0.29
Tsedevdorjiin Choijamts	Independent	1,959	0.28
Dolgoryn Bayarbileg	HUN Party	1,781	0.26
Tömör-Ochiryn Chinbat	Civil Will–Green Party	1,678	0.24
Ryenchindorjiin Enkhtuyaa	HUN Party	1,620	0.24
Magsaryn Ariunbat	New United Coalition	1,543	0.22
Galsandorjiin Bulgan	Truth and Right Party	1,456	0.21
Mönkhjargalyn Buyanzayaa	HUN Party	1,447	0.21
Dashjamtsyn Badrakh	New United Coalition	1,353	0.20
Kholkhoryn Oyuunchimeg	Civil Movement Party	1,248	0.18
Myagmarpüreviin Önörbileg	Truth and Right Party	1,178	0.17
Damdinsürengiin Daramdorj	Civil Will–Green Party	1,136	0.17
Batmönkhiin Batbayar	New United Coalition	1,131	0.16
Enkhbayaryn Tömör	Civil Movement Party	1,126	0.16
Bat-Ölziin Ganzorig	Civil Movement Party	1,123	0.16
Jam'yany Chuluun	Civil Movement Party	1,111	0.16
Badamjavyn Bazarvaani	Truth and Right Party	1,079	0.16
Jambaljamtsyn Jargalsaikhan	Civil Movement Party	1,063	0.15
Dashdondogiin Dagvasüren	Civil Will–Green Party	961	0.14
Ichinkhorloogiin Tserenkhand	Civil Movement Party	920	0.13
Alyeksandryn Bayarsaikhan	Civil Will–Green Party	912	0.13
Ulaankhüügiin Myagmarkhüü	HUN Party	898	0.13
Gansükhiin Batkhuyag	Motherland Party	897	0.13
Ideriin Odonchimeg	Republican Party	893	0.13
Ochgereliin Baatarkhuyag	Good Democratic Citizens United Party	772	0.11
Taravyn Mönkhbat	Republican Party	768	0.11
Khoroljavyn Enkhtulga	Good Democratic Citizens United Party	727	0.11
Mashlain Otgonbayar	For the Mongolian People Party	691	0.10
Tsend-Ayuushiin Batbold	Civil Movement Party	663	0.10
Ariunbayaryn Uyanga	People's Power Party	629	0.09
Tsagaany Ganbold	For the Mongolian People Party	629	0.09
Norovsambuugiin Enkhbold	Mongolian Conservative Party	598	0.09
Gankhüügiin Khürelkhüü	Citizen Participation Union Party	593	0.09
Myagmarsürengiin Odgerel	Citizen Participation Union Party	573	0.08
Batsürlegiin Bat-Erdene	Freedom Alliance Party	553	0.08
Khürelbaataryn Chinzorig	Citizen Participation Union Party	501	0.07
Valyagiin Bat-Otgon	People's Majority Rule Party	475	0.07
Khumbaadain Chingiskhaan	People's Majority Rule Party	443	0.06
Sanjaagiin Enkhbaatar	Republican Party	442	0.06
Altangereliin Tsolmon	Freedom Alliance Party	396	0.06
Sharavyn Ganbold	People's Power Party	388	0.06
Jadambaagiin Boroldoi	People's Power Party	320	0.05
Bayasgalangiin Amartüvshin	People's Majority Rule Party	316	0.05
Mendbayaryn Ankhkhatan	People's Majority Rule Party	278	0.04
Sanjaajavyn Dagmidmaa	Republican Party	274	0.04
Sharavdüvjiriin Amarjargal	People's Majority Rule Party	248	0.04
Lkhamkhandyn Tsevegdari	Freedom Alliance Party	242	0.04
Luvsanbaldangiin Batnasan	People's Power Party	203	0.03
Batjargalyn Nyamjargal	People's Majority Rule Party	174	0.03
Total		688,429	100.00
Valid votes		97,465	98.96
Invalid/blank votes		1,029	1.04
Total votes		98,494	100.00
Registered voters/turnout		143,143	68.81

7th Constituency
Candidate	Party	Votes	%
Ryenchinbyambyn Seddorj	Democratic Party	41,428	6.59
Borkhüügiin Delgersaikhan	Mongolian People's Party	39,331	6.26
Nanzadyn Naranbaatar	Mongolian People's Party	37,134	5.91
Luvsanbyambaagiin Mönkhbayasgalan	Democratic Party	37,019	5.89
Tsagaankhüügiin Mönkhbat	Democratic Party	36,433	5.80
Ravjikhyn Erdenebüren	Democratic Party	36,179	5.76
Gombyn Ganbaatar	Democratic Party	35,629	5.67
Ölziibayaryn Zolbayar	Mongolian People's Party	35,525	5.65
Tömörtogoogiin Enkhtüvshin	Mongolian People's Party	35,486	5.65
Batsükhiin Saranchimeg	Mongolian People's Party	34,557	5.50
Nasanbuyangiin Enkhbat	Democratic Party	32,101	5.11
Gombodorjiin Batsuuri	Mongolian People's Party	29,930	4.76
Luvsandorjiin Odser	Democratic Party	29,466	4.69
Gompildoogiin Mönkhtsetseg	Mongolian People's Party	27,930	4.45
Otgony Mönkhzayaa	National Coalition	9,809	1.56
Osoryn Ganbat	New United Coalition	9,001	1.43
Altangarigiin Büddorj	Truth and Right Party	8,100	1.29
Ulaanmaamyn Erdenebayar	Independent	7,401	1.18
Tsetsegeegiin Mönkhbayar	Truth and Right Party	6,885	1.10
Baatarsürengiin Uuganbayar	Independent	5,763	0.92
Tögsiin Enkhbayar	National Coalition	5,703	0.91
Jalbuugiin Jamsrandorj	HUN Party	4,396	0.70
Agvaany Otgonbayar	HUN Party	4,274	0.68
Bataagiin Erdenebat	National Coalition	3,990	0.64
Luvsandorjiin Khishigbayar	National Coalition	3,839	0.61
Darjaagiin Bolormaa	New United Coalition	3,617	0.58
Khüükhendüügiin Sugir	Civil Movement Party	3,315	0.53
Chuluuny Urangua	HUN Party	2,999	0.48
Myagmaryn Otgonbaatar	Civil Movement Party	2,785	0.44
Fyeodoryn Zorigoo	HUN Party	2,737	0.44
Büdeegiin Khökhöö	Truth and Right Party	2,726	0.43
Chagnaadorjiin Khongorzul	Civil Will–Green Party	2,604	0.41
Tömörkhürdiin Khürelbat	New United Coalition	2,360	0.38
Luvsannyamyn Ösökhjargal	New United Coalition	2,332	0.37
Yandagiin Boldbaatar	Civil Movement Party	2,313	0.37
Nyamdavaagiin Bolortsetseg	Truth and Right Party	2,252	0.36
Tsagaanchuluuny Mönkhzul	New United Coalition	2,209	0.35
Jamsrangiin Uranchimeg	Civil Will–Green Party	2,183	0.35
Ölzii-Orshikhyn Mönkh-Amgalan	Civil Movement Party	2,177	0.35
Khüreltsoojiin Nominsuvd	HUN Party	2,010	0.32
Dashdoorovyn Chimegsaikhan	Civil Movement Party	1,972	0.31
Baataryn Oyuun	Civil Will–Green Party	1,948	0.31
Sükhbatyn Enkhtaivan	Civil Movement Party	1,864	0.30
Törmönkhiin Buyanjargal	Civil Movement Party	1,764	0.28
Oyuunbatyn Bayasakh	Civil Will–Green Party	1,711	0.27
Tsogbaataryn Gandolgor	HUN Party	1,584	0.25
Janjaadorjiin Oyuunbayar	HUN Party	1,576	0.25
Nyamyn Tserendavga	New United Coalition	1,493	0.24
Batboldyn Javkhlan	Republican Party	1,468	0.23
Bataagiin Gerelt-Tsolmon	Truth and Right Party	1,418	0.23
Dagvadorjiin Dovchinsüren	Truth and Right Party	1,414	0.23
Myagmarsürengiin Sarangaravuu	Motherland Party	1,388	0.22
Sharkhüügiin Buyantogtokh	People's Majority Rule Party	1,240	0.20
Sanjaajavyn Tsogzolmaa	Republican Party	841	0.13
Baatarjavyn Batbayar	Republican Party	786	0.13
Ikhbaataryn Zolzayaa	Freedom Alliance Party	661	0.11
Gürsoronzongombosüre Ngiin Otgonbaatar	Freedom Alliance Party	655	0.10
Amarsanaagiin Mönkhzul	Freedom Alliance Party	596	0.09
Sodnomyn Nergüi	People's Power Party	581	0.09
Ganzorigiin Mönkh-Erdene	Freedom Alliance Party	565	0.09
Olzvoin Togtokhzayaa	Citizen Participation Union Party	560	0.09
Semjidiin Enkhtüvshin	Mongolian Conservative Party	559	0.09
Ganbaataryn Enkh-Undrakh	People's Power Party	492	0.08
Nyamkhüügiin Galbadrakh	Good Democratic Citizens United Party	477	0.08
Altantulgyn Khaliun	People's Power Party	421	0.07
Sangaagiin Myagmar-Od	People's Power Party	415	0.07
Damdinbaljiryn Sarantuyaa	Good Democratic Citizens United Party	410	0.07
Ganbatyn Pürevdemberel	For the Mongolian People Party	404	0.06
Davaasürengiin Narangarav	Good Democratic Citizens United Party	399	0.06
Enkhboldyn Chinbold	For the Mongolian People Party	370	0.06
Bashliin Nyamkhüü	Citizen Participation Union Party	333	0.05
Baasanjavyn Batzul	Mongolian Conservative Party	330	0.05
Sharkhüügiin Tsogmaam	For the Mongolian People Party	324	0.05
Byambajavyn Ölziikhishig	Citizen Participation Union Party	324	0.05
Luvsanjambyn Khash-Erdene	Mongolian Conservative Party	281	0.04
Nyamsürengiin Erdenechimeg	Freedom Alliance Party	275	0.04
Chogdogiin Byambatseren	Citizen Participation Union Party	261	0.04
Ochirkhüügiin Altanbayar	Citizen Participation Union Party	222	0.04
Total		628,310	100.00
Valid votes		89,331	99.39
Invalid/blank votes		551	0.61
Total votes		89,882	100.00
Registered voters/turnout		132,090	68.05

8th Constituency
Candidate	Party	Votes	%
Jigjidsürengiin Chinbüren	Mongolian People's Party	58,854	6.81
Battömöriin Enkhbayar	Mongolian People's Party	56,247	6.51
Pürevsürengiin Naranbayar	HUN Party	53,358	6.18
Enkhtaivany Bat-Amgalan	Mongolian People's Party	52,872	6.12
Khürelbaataryn Bulgantuya	Mongolian People's Party	51,214	5.93
Natsagiin Bayarmönkh	Mongolian People's Party	48,230	5.58
Mainbayaryn Tulgat	Democratic Party	47,893	5.54
Tümendelgeriin Battsogt	Democratic Party	45,661	5.29
Ganboldyn Bolormaa	Democratic Party	45,549	5.27
Tsagaan-Övgönii Jadambaa	Democratic Party	41,312	4.78
Ochirsuuriin Tsetsegbal	HUN Party	29,472	3.41
Ganboldyn Uugantsetseg	Democratic Party	27,955	3.24
Ganbaataryn Battömör	HUN Party	24,340	2.82
Erdenechimegiin Enkhzorig	New United Coalition	18,711	2.17
Dorjlkhagvyn Battsetseg	HUN Party	17,618	2.04
Ganboldyn Batbold	Good Democratic Citizens United Party	16,941	1.96
Buyantogtokhyn Alimaa	HUN Party	16,216	1.88
Bayarboldyn Jadamba	National Coalition	15,527	1.80
Boldyn Gantulga	New United Coalition	11,542	1.34
Buyandelgeriin Nandin-Erdene	Civil Will–Green Party	8,421	0.97
Damdinsürengiin Mönkhtsetseg	Civil Will–Green Party	8,376	0.97
Yadamsürengiin Batkhüü	New United Coalition	7,831	0.91
Namkhaidagvyn Temüüjin	Truth and Right Party	7,765	0.90
Batdelgeriin Erdenebayar	National Coalition	7,687	0.89
Bat-Ochiryn Tsatsral	Freedom Alliance Party	7,578	0.88
Enkhtuyaagiin Erdenetuyaa	New United Coalition	7,123	0.82
Pürevtserengiin Enkhtsetseg	National Coalition	6,789	0.79
Tsendiin Mönkhtsatsral	National Coalition	6,625	0.77
Gürdorjiin Batbayar	New United Coalition	6,420	0.74
Gandansürengiin Ganzorig	Civil Will–Green Party	6,292	0.73
Jamsrangiin Batsükh	Civil Will–Green Party	6,040	0.70
Enkhjargalyn Odbayar	Civil Will–Green Party	5,608	0.65
Gotovyn Battulga	Republican Party	4,841	0.56
Batbayaryn Ariunzayaa	Citizen Participation Union Party	4,086	0.47
Chuluunkhüügiin Uuganbaatar	Truth and Right Party	3,428	0.40
Tsedmaajavyn Batdorj	Truth and Right Party	3,421	0.40
Chuluunbaataryn Sugarsüren	Truth and Right Party	3,241	0.38
Dashtserengiin Tögsbayar	Civil Movement Party	3,065	0.35
Amartüvshingiin Bolor-Erdene	Civil Movement Party	2,949	0.34
Zorigtyn Otgonbayar	Freedom Implementing Party	2,569	0.30
Gombogüriin Undram	Civil Movement Party	2,559	0.30
Dorjkhandyn Narantuyaa	For the Mongolian People Party	2,514	0.29
Luvsandorjiin Batbayar	Republican Party	2,478	0.29
Tsogbadrakhyn Batbold	Citizen Participation Union Party	2,391	0.28
Rentsengiin Sünjidmaa	Republican Party	2,257	0.26
Ulambayaryn Khosbayar	Mongolian Conservative Party	2,140	0.25
Bayarsaikhany Ganchimeg	Republican Party	2,101	0.24
Dashtsoodolyn Khandsüren	Citizen Participation Union Party	2,072	0.24
Baasandorjiin Altanzul	Civil Movement Party	2,038	0.24
Sükhbaataryn Batbold	Motherland Party	2,009	0.23
Battulgyn Batbaatar	People's Power Party	1,974	0.23
Davaatserengiin Lkhachinsüren	Truth and Right Party	1,955	0.23
Erdenebatyn Amarmönkh	Republican Party	1,875	0.22
Tserendorjiin Altantsetseg	Motherland Party	1,815	0.21
Altan-Avdaryn Ireedüi	People's Power Party	1,808	0.21
Vanluugiin Dügermaa	People's Majority Rule Party	1,794	0.21
Tüüchintavyn Dorjgotov	Citizen Participation Union Party	1,645	0.19
Dorjgotovyn Otgonbayar	For the Mongolian People Party	1,574	0.18
Rentsendashiin Olonbayar	Mongolian Social Democratic Party	1,509	0.17
Delgerbatyn Nasanbayar	Freedom Alliance Party	1,491	0.17
Altankhuyagiin Tegshbayar	For the Mongolian People Party	1,469	0.17
Nyamdorjiin Sodchimeg	Civil Movement Party	1,446	0.17
Bat-Erdeniin Tserenlkham	Citizen Participation Union Party	1,398	0.16
Altankhüügiin Mönkhtuyaa	For the Mongolian People Party	1,230	0.14
Baastyn Zorigbayar	Freedom Implementing Party	1,180	0.14
Bayarmagnaigiin Taivanbaatar	Freedom Alliance Party	1,158	0.13
Dondogiin Tömörbaatar	People's Majority Rule Party	1,156	0.13
Otgonbayaryn Ariuntuyaa	Mongolian Conservative Party	1,151	0.13
Erdenebatyn Enkhbaatar	People's Majority Rule Party	1,111	0.13
Baigali-Erdeniin Ariunaa	Mongolian Social Democratic Party	1,100	0.13
Enkhboldyn Mergenshagai	Good Democratic Citizens United Party	1,058	0.12
Sharav-Osoryn Khandsüren	Motherland Party	1,057	0.12
Nokhoijavyn Batbold	Good Democratic Citizens United Party	1,055	0.12
Togmidyn Sünjidmaa	People's Power Party	1,027	0.12
Erdene-Ochiryn Enkhbold	Mongolian Conservative Party	955	0.11
Shagdarsürengiin Tögsbayar	Mongolian Social Democratic Party	870	0.10
Ayuushiin Dolgor	People's Majority Rule Party	866	0.10
Serchindorjiin Byamba	Freedom Alliance Party	857	0.10
Bayarsaikhany Chimegsaikhan	Good Democratic Citizens United Party	851	0.10
Dendeviin Sandagsüren	Motherland Party	844	0.10
Nergüin Enkhee	People's Majority Rule Party	840	0.10
Zorigtyn Khand	People's Power Party	775	0.09
Amarsaikhany Batjargal	People's Power Party	760	0.09
Total		863,880	100.00
Valid votes		171,536	99.10
Invalid/blank votes		1,550	0.90
Total votes		173,086	100.00
Registered voters/turnout		243,918	70.96

9th Constituency
Candidate	Party	Votes	%
Jargalsaikhany Zoljargal	HUN Party	39,771	12.71
Khassuuriin Gankhuyag	Mongolian People's Party	39,012	12.46
Jambalyn Ganbaatar	Mongolian People's Party	28,414	9.08
Ölzii-Orshikhyn Sum'yabaatar	Mongolian People's Party	27,941	8.93
Sharavdembereliin Enkhtuul	HUN Party	20,698	6.61
Tserendulamyn Altantsetseg	Democratic Party	16,539	5.28
Sodnomzunduin Erdene	Democratic Party	15,852	5.06
Tömör-Ukhnyn Zolboot	HUN Party	15,476	4.94
Tsedeviin Tavanchuluu	Democratic Party	13,485	4.31
Namsraijavyn Enkhchimeg	National Coalition	12,180	3.89
Altankhuyagiin Barkhüü	New United Coalition	8,546	2.73
Jargalsaikhany Khongorzul	National Coalition	7,864	2.51
Tsültemiin Enkhjin	Civil Will–Green Party	4,905	1.57
Grishagiin Uugankhüü	Civil Will–Green Party	4,796	1.53
Taivanbaataryn Orgilmönkh	New United Coalition	4,112	1.31
Khürelbaataryn Suvdaa	Civil Will–Green Party	3,980	1.27
Tömörkhuyagiin Narantuyaa	Civil Movement Party	3,939	1.26
Boryn Möngönkhishig	New United Coalition	3,855	1.23
Bayasgalangiin Sükhbaatar	Truth and Right Party	3,430	1.10
Ganbaataryn Shijirbat	Independent	3,021	0.97
Regzengiin Batbayar	Republican Party	2,679	0.86
Dorjsürengiin Enkh-Amgalan	Independent	2,584	0.83
Dorjderemiin Erdenetuyaa	Citizen Participation Union Party	2,176	0.70
Otgonbayaryn Oyuundari	Civil Movement Party	2,159	0.69
Galsangiin Nyamdarjaa	Independent	2,015	0.64
Sugarjavyn Tserensodnom	Independent	1,745	0.56
Tömörkhuyagiin Bolortungalag	Civil Movement Party	1,732	0.55
Chuluundorjiin Battunkhag	Truth and Right Party	1,675	0.54
Mönkhtogoogiin Byambabat	Citizen Participation Union Party	1,469	0.47
Enkhbaataryn Byambasüren	Republican Party	1,463	0.47
Natsagiin Maraltsetseg	Republican Party	1,391	0.44
Chuluunbatyn Nyamsambuu	Good Democratic Citizens United Party	1,361	0.43
Ganbatyn Mönkhjargal	For the Mongolian People Party	1,290	0.41
Dugarsürengiin Boldbaatar	People's Power Party	1,160	0.37
Shoovdoryn Tömörsükh	Freedom Implementing Party	1,083	0.35
Jalbaagiin Batbileg	Mongolian Conservative Party	978	0.31
Dorjiin Baigalmaa	Motherland Party	860	0.27
Buyandalain Byambasüren	Citizen Participation Union Party	836	0.27
Sodnompilyn Ninj	Motherland Party	822	0.26
Altanbaganyn Manlaibaatar	Freedom Alliance Party	708	0.23
Tserenbaljiryn Zorigtbaatar	People's Majority Rule Party	646	0.21
Batmönkhiin Byambagerel	Freedom Alliance Party	571	0.18
Gantömöriin Tuul	Motherland Party	531	0.17
Dugarjavyn Bayanmönkh	Freedom Alliance Party	523	0.17
Ganbatyn Ariunbüüvei	People's Power Party	520	0.17
Tsendiin Batsükh	People's Majority Rule Party	507	0.16
Chogsomyn Oyuuntungalag	Freedom Implementing Party	468	0.15
Dolgorsürengiin Bayarsaikhan	Freedom Implementing Party	443	0.14
Damdinsürengiin Odgerel	People's Majority Rule Party	443	0.14
Mönkh-Amgalangiin Baasantsend	People's Power Party	357	0.11
Total		313,011	100.00
Valid votes		103,875	99.34
Invalid/blank votes		693	0.66
Total votes		104,568	100.00
Registered voters/turnout		145,838	71.70

10th Constituency
Candidate	Party	Votes	%
Nyam-Osoryn Uchral	Mongolian People's Party	67,107	8.85
Otgonsharyn Batnairamdal	Mongolian People's Party	43,261	5.71
Tsendiin Baatarkhüü	Democratic Party	36,540	4.82
Natsagdorjiin Batsümberel	Mongolian People's Party	34,261	4.52
Damdiny Tsogtbaatar	Mongolian People's Party	32,907	4.34
Khökhkhüügiin Bolormaa	Democratic Party	32,279	4.26
Bazarsadyn Jargalsaikhan	Republican Party	30,930	4.08
Ganzorigiin Dashnyam	Mongolian People's Party	30,727	4.05
Chadraabalyn Önörbayar	Democratic Party	29,446	3.88
Mönkhöögiin Oyuunchimeg	Mongolian People's Party	27,995	3.69
Davaasürengiin Badarsan	Democratic Party	26,906	3.55
Tsenddorjiin Erdenebat	HUN Party	26,379	3.48
Ishjamtsyn Mönkhjargal	Democratic Party	25,449	3.36
Oktyabriin Baasankhüü	Democratic Party	23,769	3.14
Pürveegiin Bayarkhüü	National Coalition	16,144	2.13
Dorjvalyn Enkhjargal	HUN Party	14,630	1.93
Dorjoogiin Batsaikhan	HUN Party	14,337	1.89
Ranjilyn Badmaanyambuu	HUN Party	13,607	1.80
Battsengeliin Khash-Erdene	HUN Party	12,197	1.61
Ragchaagiin Erdenebileg	HUN Party	11,881	1.57
Davaagiin Ganbold	National Coalition	11,761	1.55
Jukovyn Bayarjavkhlan	Civil Will–Green Party	10,986	1.45
Dashiin Batsükh	Independent	10,903	1.44
Chimeddorjiin Amarsanaa	New United Coalition	9,346	1.23
Tserendambyn Bayarkhüü	New United Coalition	7,939	1.05
Tsegmediin Bumtsend	New United Coalition	7,934	1.05
Enebishiin Odontuyaa	Civil Will–Green Party	7,657	1.01
Jargalsaikhany Ünenbayar	Truth and Right Party	7,278	0.96
Jamsrandorjiin Tsogzolmaa	National Coalition	6,829	0.90
Sanjaasürengiin Ganbat	National Coalition	5,990	0.79
Mönkhbatyn Ariunzul	New United Coalition	5,229	0.69
Serjgotovyn Khan-Uul	Civil Will–Green Party	5,076	0.67
Chimedregzengiin Batbaatar	New United Coalition	4,568	0.60
Myangan-Yondongiin Mönkhjargal	Civil Will–Green Party	4,444	0.59
Zorigiin Tuyaa	Citizen Participation Union Party	4,292	0.57
Enkhboldyn Bat-Orshikh	Truth and Right Party	4,197	0.55
Nergüin Lkhagva-Ochir	Civil Will–Green Party	4,123	0.54
Sambuugiin Tömörbat	Republican Party	3,839	0.51
Erdeniin Odongerel	Mongolian Conservative Party	3,772	0.50
Tsendsürengiin Ganbat	Civil Movement Party	3,697	0.49
Yondonsambuugiin Batbayar	Republican Party	3,472	0.46
Tsogtsaikhany Pürevsüren	New United Coalition	3,453	0.46
Myagmarjavyn Uranchimeg	Truth and Right Party	3,422	0.45
Günzengiin Byambadorj	Civil Will–Green Party	3,303	0.44
Dashzevegiin Ad'yaabaatar	Truth and Right Party	2,631	0.35
Jantsandorjiin Yanjinsüren	Republican Party	2,472	0.33
Shagdarsürengiin Ariunaa	Civil Movement Party	2,236	0.29
Baasanjavyn Amarsaikhan	For the Mongolian People Party	2,152	0.28
Batsükhiin Gombosüren	Truth and Right Party	2,137	0.28
Erdene-Ochiryn Ankhtuyaa	Civil Movement Party	2,135	0.28
Tömörkhuyagiin Ögöömörzayaa	Citizen Participation Union Party	1,953	0.26
Khürelbaataryn Zorig	Citizen Participation Union Party	1,929	0.25
Jantsanpüreviin Amgalanbaatar	People's Power Party	1,888	0.25
Ganbaataryn Uranchimeg	Civil Movement Party	1,879	0.25
Sarantuyaagiin Narantuyaa	Freedom Implementing Party	1,859	0.25
Törbatyn Tenüün	Motherland Party	1,709	0.23
Dugarjavyn Ariunaa	Citizen Participation Union Party	1,699	0.22
Batbaataryn Günjinlkham	Civil Movement Party	1,684	0.22
Boldoogiin Batnasan	Motherland Party	1,662	0.22
Rentsendoorovyn Battömör	People's Majority Rule Party	1,554	0.21
Dorjiin Soyolmaa	Motherland Party	1,552	0.20
Dorjgotovyn Nyamtseren	Civil Movement Party	1,472	0.19
Baatarjavyn Altanbagana	Good Democratic Citizens United Party	1,458	0.19
Myagmardashiin Orkhonbayar	Citizen Participation Union Party	1,432	0.19
Byambaagiin Ganbaatar	Freedom Alliance Party	1,353	0.18
Sambuugiin Mönkhtsetseg	For the Mongolian People Party	1,330	0.18
Lkhagvajavyn Tuyaa	People's Power Party	1,293	0.17
Namsrain Enkhtsolmon	Good Democratic Citizens United Party	1,200	0.16
Avidyn Tamir	For the Mongolian People Party	1,192	0.16
Bayarmagnaigiin Önör-Orshikh	Freedom Alliance Party	1,168	0.15
Baljiryn Mönkhtuyaa	Freedom Alliance Party	1,167	0.15
Tulgaagiin Zolbayar	Freedom Alliance Party	1,047	0.14
Lamjavyn Adilbish	Freedom Implementing Party	1,037	0.14
Bürenjargalyn Batmönkh	Freedom Implementing Party	1,004	0.13
Sükhbaataryn Sod-Erdene	People's Power Party	991	0.13
Baasangiin Otgontsetseg	People's Power Party	932	0.12
Bazarbidarinyn Dorjsüren	Citizen Participation Union Party	922	0.12
Ganbatyn Sanchir	People's Power Party	921	0.12
Tömörkhuyagiin Khandmaa	Motherland Party	904	0.12
Jadambyn Naranchimeg	People's Power Party	836	0.11
Pürevdorjiin Erdenebulgan	Freedom Alliance Party	830	0.11
Sanjmyatavyn Saruul-Amidral	People's Majority Rule Party	783	0.10
Erdenetsogtyn Batchimeg	Freedom Alliance Party	780	0.10
Mudgyn Togtokhbayar	Motherland Party	744	0.10
Tseveendorjiin Erdemt	People's Majority Rule Party	725	0.10
Dashrentsengiin Naranjargal	People's Majority Rule Party	708	0.09
Dashzevegiin Lkhagvabayar	Good Democratic Citizens United Party	696	0.09
Khürelbaataryn Enkhtuyaa	Freedom Implementing Party	683	0.09
Bazarvaaniin Uranbileg	Motherland Party	660	0.09
Byambaagiin Zuunnast	For the Mongolian People Party	654	0.09
Chuluunbaataryn Bayarsodnom	People's Majority Rule Party	604	0.08
Gombojavyn Oyuunbayar	Freedom Implementing Party	592	0.08
Dariin Lkhagvadorj	People's Majority Rule Party	463	0.06
Total		757,974	100.00
Valid votes		125,249	98.98
Invalid/blank votes		1,296	1.02
Total votes		126,545	100.00
Registered voters/turnout		182,511	69.34

11th Constituency
Candidate	Party	Votes	%
Enkhbayaryn Batshugar	Mongolian People's Party	58,914	8.48
Norovyn Altankhuyag	Democratic Party	53,659	7.73
Narantsetsegiin Altanshagai	Mongolian People's Party	48,527	6.99
Pürevjavyn Sainzorig	Mongolian People's Party	46,833	6.74
Chinbatyn Nomin	Mongolian People's Party	44,187	6.36
Nyamdavaagiin Khürelbaatar	Mongolian People's Party	43,661	6.29
Nemekhbayaryn Amarjin	Democratic Party	39,842	5.74
Pürevdorjiin Galindev	Democratic Party	35,050	5.05
Gantömöriin Khajidmaa	Civil Will–Green Party	28,541	4.11
Jadambaagiin Otgonbayar	Democratic Party	27,939	4.02
Tsoggereliin Uyanga	Democratic Party	19,985	2.88
Gansükhiin Maitsetseg	HUN Party	19,151	2.76
Baljinnyamyn Tsegmed	Independent	18,293	2.63
Jagvaralyn Tömörkhuyag	HUN Party	13,080	1.88
Gendendaramyn Batzorig	HUN Party	10,725	1.54
Chuluuny Bayarsaikhan	HUN Party	10,662	1.54
Otgonsürengiin Tsogtbayar	Civil Will–Green Party	8,350	1.20
Ochirbatyn Uuganbayar	Civil Will–Green Party	7,745	1.12
Jügdernamjilyn Bayarkhüü	Truth and Right Party	7,734	1.11
Jargalsaikhany Üüriinzayaa	Civil Will–Green Party	7,596	1.09
Narantsetsegiin Oyuungerel	Civil Movement Party	6,161	0.89
Nyam-Osoryn Bürenbat	National Coalition	6,030	0.87
Tömörkhuyagiin Naranzul	New United Coalition	5,761	0.83
Tsetsegmaagiin Baasanjav	Civil Will–Green Party	5,519	0.79
Tümen-Oiloogiin Tsooj	New United Coalition	5,410	0.78
Tseveenii Beejin	National Coalition	5,254	0.76
Badarchiin Odkhüü	Independent	5,186	0.75
Nyangaryn Batchuluun	New United Coalition	5,131	0.74
Narantsetsegiin Battogtokh	New United Coalition	5,088	0.73
Baatar-Ochiryn Enkhnaran	National Coalition	4,322	0.62
Namdagiin Natsagdorj	Independent	4,320	0.62
Yunrengiin Darambazar	Independent	4,120	0.59
Zagdaagiin Gerelt-Od	Truth and Right Party	3,849	0.55
Düngeegiin Lkhagvadorj	New United Coalition	3,616	0.52
Lkhagvyn Enkhbold	Independent	3,572	0.51
Ad'yaagiin Erdenebileg	Mongolian Social Democratic Party	3,418	0.49
Choijiljavyn Batbayar	Republican Party	3,328	0.48
Dünshigiin Myagmarsüren	Truth and Right Party	3,013	0.43
Dogsomchuluuny Üüriintuyaa	Civil Movement Party	2,892	0.42
Dashdorjiin Myadagmaa	Truth and Right Party	2,841	0.41
Khishigdulamyn Oyuunbayar	Truth and Right Party	2,819	0.41
Dorjjantsangiin Bolortuyaa	Republican Party	2,518	0.36
Sükhiin Ochir	Republican Party	2,423	0.35
Dashdorjiin Narmandakh	Republican Party	2,345	0.34
Khadbaataryn Batchimeg	Civil Movement Party	2,328	0.34
Pürevjavyn Bayarkhüü	Freedom Alliance Party	2,216	0.32
Ganbaataryn Amartüvshin	Freedom Alliance Party	2,076	0.30
Ichinkhorloogiin Sarangerel	Citizen Participation Union Party	1,959	0.28
Tserenbatyn Badamsüren	Civil Movement Party	1,795	0.26
Baatarjavyn Ganzorig	For the Mongolian People Party	1,681	0.24
Batsuuriin Enkh-Amgalan	Motherland Party	1,625	0.23
Naryn Sarangerel	Freedom Alliance Party	1,532	0.22
Shagdaryn Ölziitogtokh	Citizen Participation Union Party	1,483	0.21
Byambajavyn Nyamtsagaan	Civil Movement Party	1,478	0.21
Badarchiin Yeröölt	Motherland Party	1,425	0.21
Sharav-Osoryn Gantögs	Motherland Party	1,347	0.19
Boldyn Enkhtüvshin	Mongolian Conservative Party	1,198	0.17
Uranchimegiin Khaliunaa	Freedom Alliance Party	1,162	0.17
Chimediin Baasanjav	People's Power Party	1,125	0.16
Ganboldyn Khongorzul	Freedom Implementing Party	1,113	0.16
Javzangiin Namnansüren	People's Power Party	1,048	0.15
Togoogiin Ganbat	Citizen Participation Union Party	1,045	0.15
Boldbaataryn Tungalagkharaa	Republican Party	1,017	0.15
Chültemsürengiin Chunt	Citizen Participation Union Party	998	0.14
Lkhündeviin Lkhagvadorj	People's Majority Rule Party	944	0.14
Ajirshavgaany Enkhbaatar	Citizen Participation Union Party	937	0.13
Yundengiin Batchuluun	For the Mongolian People Party	890	0.13
Boldyn Soyol-Erdene	Freedom Implementing Party	856	0.12
Tsendkhüügiin Zandankhüü	For the Mongolian People Party	849	0.12
Sampilnorovyn Batbold	For the Mongolian People Party	840	0.12
Pürevsürengiin Ulambayar	People's Power Party	839	0.12
Begziin Khishigbayar	People's Majority Rule Party	811	0.12
Khishigtogtokhyn Mönkhtogtokh	Mongolian Conservative Party	779	0.11
Amindavaagiin Davaadorj	Good Democratic Citizens United Party	775	0.11
Dulamyn Sanchir	Good Democratic Citizens United Party	756	0.11
Tömör-Ochiryn Myagmardorj	Motherland Party	743	0.11
Nasbatyn Sugarsüren	Motherland Party	729	0.10
Sharavyn Tömör	Freedom Implementing Party	697	0.10
Nyamdovdongiin Gantuyaa	People's Majority Rule Party	684	0.10
Baasansürengiin Oyuunjargal	Good Democratic Citizens United Party	656	0.09
Tsogtbaataryn Baasandorj	Mongolian Conservative Party	652	0.09
Namnangiin Enkh-Ölzii	People's Majority Rule Party	557	0.08
Denzengiin Chuluunbat	People's Majority Rule Party	548	0.08
Lkhamyn Khishigdavaa	Freedom Implementing Party	476	0.07
Khuunain Böndör	People's Power Party	471	0.07
Total		694,550	100.00
Valid votes		137,878	99.07
Invalid/blank votes		1,290	0.93
Total votes		139,168	100.00
Registered voters/turnout		219,313	63.46

12th Constituency
Candidate	Party	Votes	%
Togtmolyn Mönkhsaikhan	Mongolian People's Party	45,396	13.11
Chuluunbilegiin Lodoisambuu	Democratic Party	40,937	11.82
Jukovyn Aldarjavkhlan	Mongolian People's Party	40,915	11.82
Sanjaadorjiin Molor-Erdene	Civil Will–Green Party	22,474	6.49
Tsedevdambyn Oyungerel	Citizen Participation Union Party	22,419	6.47
Luvsandashiin Ninjjamts	Mongolian People's Party	22,384	6.46
Erdene-Ochiryn Tamir	Democratic Party	17,090	4.94
Byambasürengiin Jagar	Good Democratic Citizens United Party	16,261	4.70
Banzragchiin Otgontögs	HUN Party	15,594	4.50
Sodnomdorjiin Sanaser	HUN Party	15,470	4.47
Byambyn Ariunbold	Democratic Party	14,002	4.04
Altansükhiin Mandakhnaran	HUN Party	11,051	3.19
Batmönkhiin Tsetsegsaikhan	National Coalition	5,705	1.65
Khosbayaryn Amarsaikhan	National Coalition	5,647	1.63
Altangereliin Batmönkh	Independent	4,858	1.40
Seteviin Shaariibuu	Civil Will–Green Party	4,095	1.18
Byambasürengiin Bayarmaa	New United Coalition	3,824	1.10
Shagdarsürengiin Bat-Erdene	New United Coalition	3,590	1.04
Nadmidtserengiin Tamir	New United Coalition	3,584	1.04
Tsogt-Ochiryn Jargalsaikhan	Republican Party	3,180	0.92
Batbayaryn Bat-Ochir	Truth and Right Party	3,154	0.91
Boldyn Mönkhsaikhan	Truth and Right Party	2,891	0.83
Bayarkhüügiin Bat-Yalalt	Freedom Alliance Party	2,195	0.63
Pürevkhüügiin Minjmaa	Civil Will–Green Party	2,132	0.62
Jürmediin Zanaa	Civil Movement Party	1,972	0.57
Barbaataryn Bolortuyaa	Civil Movement Party	1,470	0.42
Chuluunbatyn Batchimeg	Citizen Participation Union Party	1,353	0.39
Gankhuyagiin Undral	Truth and Right Party	1,318	0.38
Pürevdorjiin Bayartüvshin	Citizen Participation Union Party	1,259	0.36
Bayaraagiin Amarmend	Civil Movement Party	1,168	0.34
Zandar'yaagiin Ariunaa	Republican Party	830	0.24
Gochoosürengiin Batjargal	Mongolian Conservative Party	785	0.23
Baasanbyambyn Sanchirmaa	Republican Party	767	0.22
Tsagaany Chinbat	Motherland Party	579	0.17
Distein Tulga	For the Mongolian People Party	522	0.15
Ganboldyn Ariuntuyaa	Motherland Party	501	0.14
Tserendagvyn Oyuunaa	Mongolian Social Democratic Party	451	0.13
Banzragchiin Törbold	Mongolian Social Democratic Party	441	0.13
Tömöriin Ganchimeg	Freedom Alliance Party	425	0.12
Battömöriin Mönkhtsetseg	People's Power Party	420	0.12
Dorjpüreviin Tsolmonkhüü	People's Power Party	417	0.12
Pürevdorjiin Enkhmend	Freedom Alliance Party	411	0.12
Yundengiin Batbold	For the Mongolian People Party	397	0.11
Baljinnyamyn Narangerel	For the Mongolian People Party	393	0.11
Bayaraagiin Mandakh	People's Power Party	369	0.11
Sükhbaataryn Bürentsogt	Motherland Party	361	0.10
Tsegmediin Dagvadorj	People's Majority Rule Party	311	0.09
Jam'yangiin Pürevdorj	People's Majority Rule Party	270	0.08
Dügerjavyn Batbaatar	People's Majority Rule Party	228	0.07
Total		346,266	100.00
Valid votes		115,068	99.54
Invalid/blank votes		531	0.46
Total votes		115,599	100.00
Registered voters/turnout		153,077	75.52

13th Constituency
Candidate	Party	Votes	%
Sainbuyangiin Amarsaikhan	Mongolian People's Party	16,539	26.26
Tsendiin Sandag-Ochir	Mongolian People's Party	12,347	19.60
Dashzevegiin Altankhuyag	Democratic Party	9,745	15.47
Ganaagiin Tsambagarav	Democratic Party	7,493	11.90
Badralyn Mönkhdöl	HUN Party	3,517	5.58
Bat-Ochiryn Enkhmaa	HUN Party	3,142	4.99
Sükhbaataryn Tsogzolmaa	National Coalition	2,151	3.42
Batbilegiin Erdenebayar	New United Coalition	1,245	1.98
Mangaagiin Batnasan	Civil Will–Green Party	1,189	1.89
Naranbadrakhyn Enkhbold	Truth and Right Party	849	1.35
Myagmarjavyn Baatarkhuyag	Truth and Right Party	558	0.89
Lkhagvyn Densmaa	Civil Movement Party	376	0.60
Tömörbaataryn Batbold	Republican Party	342	0.54
Chuluuny Manduul	Freedom Implementing Party	342	0.54
Altantsoojiin Khaliunaa	Civil Movement Party	317	0.50
Dorjvain Enkhtör	Motherland Party	281	0.45
Gerelmaagiin Ankhzayaa	For the Mongolian People Party	245	0.39
Dorjpalamyn Tsengelmaa	Mongolian Liberal Democratic Party	232	0.37
Bat-Ochiryn Otgon	Freedom Alliance Party	231	0.37
Tündeviin Dariimaa	United Patriots Party	213	0.34
Sandagdariin Ganbaatar	People's Majority Rule Party	183	0.29
Tseveliin Dolgormaa	People's Majority Rule Party	183	0.29
Lkhagvaagiin Khulan	Freedom Alliance Party	175	0.28
Chuluuntogtokhyn Gansüren	Citizen Participation Union Party	175	0.28
Samdannorovyn Zoltoi	Republican Party	164	0.26
Mönkhtuyaagiin Oyuunkhishig	Citizen Participation Union Party	158	0.25
Naranchimegiin Uyanga	People's Majority Rule Party	145	0.23
Tamiryn Tögöldör	People's Majority Rule Party	120	0.19
Minaryn Büdragchaa	Mongolian Conservative Party	116	0.18
Batjargalyn Bayarmaa	Mongolian Conservative Party	89	0.14
Nagaanragchaagiin Khangalbaatar	Good Democratic Citizens United Party	62	0.10
Boldbaataryn Bolor	Good Democratic Citizens United Party	62	0.10
Total		62,986	100.00
Valid votes		31,401	99.42
Invalid/blank votes		184	0.58
Total votes		31,585	100.00
Registered voters/turnout		48,489	65.14

=== Incumbents who were unseated ===
Members of Parliament who lost re-election
MP	Seat	First elected	Party	New MP	New party
Gombojavyn Zandanshatar	Bayankhongor	2004 (Note: Zandanshatar lost his seat in 2012 but was re-elected through an election in 2016)	Mongolian People's Party	Not applicable	
Amgalangiin Adiyaasüren	Bayankhongor	2020	Democratic Party	Not applicable	
Dulamdorjiin Togtokhsüren	Övörkhangai	2016	Mongolian People's Party	Not applicable	
Sodnomyn Chinzorig	Övörkhangai	2016	Mongolian People's Party	Not applicable	
Gochoogiin Ganbold	Övörkhangai	2020	Mongolian People's Party	Not applicable	
Tsedendambyn Tserenpuntsag	Zavkhan	2020	Mongolian People's Party	Not applicable	
Baljinnyamyn Bayarsaikhan	Zavkhan	2020	Mongolian People's Party	Not applicable	
Shirnenbanidiin Adishaa	Khovd	2020	Democratic Party	Not applicable	
Chimediin Khürelbaatar	Uvs	2008	Mongolian People's Party	Not applicable	
Damdinsürengiin Önörbolor	Selenge	2020	Mongolian People's Party	Not applicable	
Purev-Ochiryn Anujin	Songino Khairkhan	2020	Mongolian People's Party	Not applicable	
Nayantain Ganibal	Sükhbaatar	2020	Democratic Party	Not applicable	
Tömörtogoogiin Enkhtüvshin	Dornogovi	2020	Mongolian People's Party	Not applicable	
Batsükhiin Saranchimeg	Bayanzürkh	2016	Mongolian People's Party	Not applicable	
Gompildoogiin Mönkhtsetseg	Dundgovi; Govisümber	2016	Mongolian People's Party	Not applicable	
Mönkhöögiin Oyuunchimeg	Chingeltei	2016	Mongolian People's Party	Not applicable	

== Since 1992 ==
=== Parliamentary elections ===
State Great Khural elections (Mongolian: Улсын Их Хурлын сонгууль) are conducted every four years, usually being held in late June or early July. The unicameral State Great Khural is made up of 126 members of parliament, elected for a four-year term. Parliamentary elections can be held before regular schedule if parliament dissolves itself with or without the president. Parliamentary electoral systems has varied due to frequent amendment of election laws. Since the most recent 2023 amendments, Mongolia's current electoral system has been a mixed majoritarian-proportional system, with 78 majoritarian-elected members and 48 proportianally-elected members. Closed party lists must adhere to the zipper system, where 50% of the list are female and 50% male. Mongolia had previously held its first parliamentary election using a similar mixed electoral system in 2012, where 48 MPs were elected via plurality block voting and 28 via proportional allocation. In the district seats, candidates required at least 28% of the vote cast to be elected. If no one met the threshold, a runoff election was held in the respective district with twice the number of representatives as there are seats to be filled, between the top vote-getters of the first round.

Mongolia has a multi-party system with two dominant political parties—the Mongolian People's Party and the Democratic Party. Other third parties have been represented in the State Great Khural, with the most notable third party being the MPP-splinter Mongolian People's Revolutionary Party from 2010 until its dissolution in 2021. Currently, Mongolia's third largest party has been the HUN Party since 2021.

Election	Electoral system	Constituencies	Majority
1992	Block voting	26 multi-member	MPRP (70)
1996	Block voting	26 multi-member	Democratic Union (50)
2000	First-past-the-post	76 single-member	MPRP (72)
2004	First-past-the-post	76 single-member	MPRP (37) tied with MDC (35)
2008	Block voting	26 multi-member	MPRP (68)
2012	Parallel voting (BPV + List PR)	26 multi-member	Democratic (34)
2016	First-past-the-post	76 single-member	MPP (65)
2020	Block voting	29 multi-member	MPP (62)
2024	Parallel voting (BPV + List PR)	13 multi-member	MPP (68)

=== Presidential elections ===
- 1993 Mongolian presidential election
- 1997 Mongolian presidential election
- 2001 Mongolian presidential election
- 2005 Mongolian presidential election
- 2009 Mongolian presidential election
- 2013 Mongolian presidential election
- 2017 Mongolian presidential election
- 2021 Mongolian presidential election
  1993
  1997
  2001
  2005
  2009
  2013
  2017 (first round)
  2017 (second round)
  2021

== Before 1992 ==
=== Mongolian People's Republic ===
- 1924 Mongolian parliamentary election
- 1951 Mongolian parliamentary election
- 1954 Mongolian parliamentary election
- 1957 Mongolian parliamentary election
- 1960 Mongolian parliamentary election
- 1963 Mongolian parliamentary election
- 1966 Mongolian parliamentary election
- 1969 Mongolian parliamentary election
- 1973 Mongolian parliamentary election
- 1977 Mongolian parliamentary election
- 1981 Mongolian parliamentary election
- 1986 Mongolian parliamentary election
- 1990 Mongolian parliamentary election

== See also ==
- Electoral calendar
- Electoral system
- Political parties in Mongolia
