= Asgat =

Asgat may refer to:

- Asgat, Sükhbaatar, Mongolia
- Asgat, Zavkhan, Mongolia
