= Mend-Ooyo Gombojav =

Mongolian poet and writer

- Born: 1952 (age 73–74); Dariganga, Sükhbaatar, Mongolia
- Education: University of Arts and Culture (MA, 1996); Mongolian Educational University (1974–1978); Pedagogical College (1970)
- Occupation: Writer
- Writing career
- Years active: 1985–present
- Genres: -->
- Notable works: Golden Hill (Altan Ovoo); The Holy One (Gegeenten); The Steppe of Mind (Oyun sanaanii heer tal); All shining moments (Gerelteh agshin bur)
- Website: Mend-Ooyo.mn

Mend-Ooyo Gombojav is a Mongolian writer, poet and calligraphist. He was born into a herder's family in Dariganga, Sükhbaatar, Mongolia, in 1952. Mend-Ooyo lives in Ulaanbaatar, Mongolia, and directs the Mongolian Academy of Culture and Poetry.

== Career ==
He started his career in 1970, as an elementary school teacher in the border village of Zamiin Uud, Dornogovi aimag, in the far south east of Mongolia. For ten years, from 1978, he was the editor-in-chief for the arts and cultural programmes on Mongolian State radio and television, In 1988 he became a professional writer with the Mongolian Writer's Union.

After the 1990 Democratic Revolution in Mongolia, Mend-Ooyo became the Chief Project Lead and driving force behind the reconstruction of the Migjid Janraisig complex at Gandantegchinlen Monastery in Ulaanbaatar. At that time he was also a member of the Mongolian National Committee of UNESCO, and, successively, executive director, vice-president and president of the Mongolian Cultural Foundation. From 1998-2000 he sat as Chairman of the governmental Culture and Arts Agency.

In 2002 he became Life member of the World Academy of Arts and Culture. In 2004 he joined the board of the Mongolian Art Council. In 2005 he founded the Mongolian culture, literature and poetry magazine GUNU, for which he also acted as the editor-in-chief. In that same year he became president of the Mongolian Academy of Culture and Poetry. In 2006 he became the President of the 26th World Congress of Poets in Mongolia. He joined in fellow residency program in Civitella Ranieri Foundation in 2014, and also led the World Poetry Days in Mongolia in 2017.

In 1996, Mend-Ooyo earned a Master's degree at the University of Arts and Culture in Mongolia. In 2002, he was granted a Doctorate of Literature by the World Academy of Arts and Culture. In 2008, he became professor of Arts and Culture at the Institute of International Studies of the Mongolian Academy of Sciences. In 2015, the University of Arts and Culture, Mongolia granted him Honorary doctor for his achievement in literature.

== Poetry ==
Mend-Ooyo started writing poems at the age of thirteen. In an interview for the WSJ he explains he became interested in writing, thanks in part to Dorjiin Gombojav. D.Gombojav was a controversial poet and translator who had alienated officials in Ulaanbaatar. He was sent, as punishment, to teach at the remote rural school Mend-Ooyo attended. Mend-Ooyo related to the interviewer that he wrote his first lines of poetry under D.Gombojav's guidance. "He taught me the importance of Mongolian language and our traditions," he says.

In the late 1970s, he was one of the founder members of the underground literary group GAL (Fire). Mend-Ooyo explained that at the time, communist censors wouldn't let groups meet. "They were always watching us, so we had to be very careful and meet in people's homes at night." The GAL group, active in the late 1970s and early 1980s, included mainly Mend-Ooyo, Ochirbatyn Dashbalbar and D.Nyamsüren. Though GAL was "organised around the so-called Dariganga Three", others were at times involved as well. According to Simon Wickham-Smith, they "came to dominate the poetry scene during the subsequent ten or fifteen years, and their work is vital for a proper understanding of recent literary history in Mongolia."

GAL transformed during the 1980s into an "independent flow of literary writing called GUNU", whose writers "nowadays exercise(s) the greatest influence on Mongolian literature."

In the 1980s, Mend-Ooyo was allowed to publish some of his poetry after it was vetted by officials. Later, in 1988, Mend-Ooyo became a member of the Mongolian Writers' Union.

In 1980, he published his first book of poetry, The Bird of Thought. Many were to follow. After the 1990 Democratic Revolution in Mongolia and the end of single-party communist rule, he started to publish more of his work, "including the writing that espoused his pastoral roots and eventually became his best-known poems." Since his first book, he has published over twenty other books of poetry, and over a dozen novels and children's books.

Altan Ovoo (Golden Hill) is an ongoing work of poetic fiction. First published in 1993, its fifth edition was published in 2010. Altan Ovoo has been translated into English by Simon Wickham-Smith in 2007. Altan Ovoo has been the focus of Simon Wickham-Smith's Ph.D. dissertation at the University of Washington. He explains that "Mend-Ooyo's poetic novel Altan Ovoo offers a vision of nomadic literature based as much on the history and worldview of Mongol nomadic herders as on the late twentieth century Mongolia, poised between Soviet-influenced socialism and Euro-American democratic capitalism, in which it was written."

Gegeenten (The Holy One), published in 2012, is a modern example of the traditional Mongolian genre of namtar, non-canonical biographies of Buddhist saints intended to be read by common people. Mend-Ooyo explains that Gegeenten tells the story of the Noton Hutagt Dulduityn Danzanravjaa. It tells "of his realisation of, and how he expressed, the secret wisdom in the teaching and practise of the historical Buddha and his descendents." The story, according to the writer, "also reveals how Danzanravjaa's life speaks to Mongol intellectual culture and the nomadic tradition of the Gobi area in which he lived, and how this tradition is an expression of the land and the environment in which he lived." According to Maria Petrova, Gegeenten "can be called the first prose work, where the image of the great Gobi Noenkhutukhta (sic) and poet D.Ravzhi (sic) found artistic expression."

Mend-Ooyo writes his poetry by hand. He tried to write his poetry on the computer. He says of this experience: "It was amazing how easy and peaceful it was to erase what I had written, to begin again, to change words and to rearrange them, and to adjust the rhythm of a poem. When I had finished my poem, I printed it out. I read it. The spirit with which I had been born was missing, there was no mental engagement in it." And: "I understood that my manuscript was the soul of my poem, the source of its spiritual power. A writer's manuscript is the calligraphy which shows the unrepeatable beating of their heart, the pathway through their warm life."

== Awards ==
Mend-Ooyo has been awarded many prizes from literary organizations around the world. Most notably, he has been named Distinguished cultural figure of Mongolia, by decree of the President of Mongolia in 1996; received the Award of the Mongolian Writers' Union in 1999; and was named Best Man of the Year 2001, and honoured as one of the nine most renowned people in Mongolia. In 2001, Mend-Ooyo was awarded the Altan Ud (Golden Feather) award, Mongolia's Writer of the Year. In 2006, the year of the 800th Anniversary of Great Mongolian Empire, Mend-Ooyo was awarded the Anniversary medal by the President of Mongolia. In 2012, Mend-Ooyo once again received the Altan Ud award, for his book Gegeenten.

He received many international award and accolades, from China to England, Greece and Korea, India, Japan and the USA. In 2005, he received the Medallion of the President award of the World Academy of Arts and Culture "for poetic excellence". In that same year, he won First prize in the poetry contest of the XXV World Congress of Poets. 2006 saw him receiving a string of awards from Greece, Korean and India, in addition to the Golden Gavel Award of the World Academy of Arts and Culture, and the Golden Medal of the Literary Academy of World Peace. 2008 was also a rewarding year for Mend-Ooyo, with awards from the Crane Summit 21st Century International (Poetry) Forum and the Soka Gakkai University. In 2009, Mend-Ooyo was named Poet Laureate (with Golden Crown), the highest poetry award of the World Congress of Poets. In 2014, he was awarded the Grand Prize of the Mihai Eminescu International Festival in Craiova, Romania. In 2015 he received the Order of Chinggis Khaan, the highest honor of Mongolia, by the declaration of Mongolian President.

== Calligraphy ==
In 2011, the Дэлхий ээж (Delhii eej: Earth Mother, Mother Earth, or World Mother) poetry and calligraphy exhibition was held in the Mongolian Modern Art Gallery in Ulaanbaatar, in collaboration with another calligrapher, D.Battömör. Before setting out creating some sixty calligraphies, Battömör first read two of Mend-Ooyo's (All Shining Moments and A Patch of White Mist) for inspiration. Together they choose the calligraphies they thought best expressed in calligraphic form Mend-Ooyo's verse. The poems were then written into the calligraphies in manuscript (as opposed to draw them with a brush). Afterwards, Battömör and Mend-Ooyo stamped their seals on these calligraphies. This exhibition traveled to Japan in 2012, where it showed at the Kyoritsu Women's University in Tokyo.

In 2014, Mend-Ooyo participated in the joint calligraphy exhibition Sky, Sun and Partnership, held at the Blue Moon Art Gallery, in celebration of the 40th anniversary of Mongolian-Japanese cultural relations. The line-up of artists included public figures such as the Mongolian President Tsakhiagiin Elbegdorj, then Mongolian Prime Minister Norovyn Altankhuyag and the Japanese Prime Minister Shinzō Abe. The Sky, Sun, Partnership exhibition traveled to Japan in March, 2015. Mend-Ooyo opened the exhibition, which was held at the Itochu Aoyama Art Square. Some of the exhibited pieces were to be auctioned for charity, the proceeds donated to volunteer groups to support the recovery of the area affected by the 2011 Great East Japan earthquake.

== Themes in Mend-Ooyo's poetry ==
In an interview Simon Wickham-Smith says: "The idea of traditional Mongolian culture is paramount to Mend-Ooyo. He is trying to keep the nomadic spirit alive in spite of modernization" He adds "Mr. Mend-Ooyo is arguably the most important poet in Mongolia today, and certainly the one with the most presence, though some of the newer generation might say he is a bit stuck in the past."

In the same article for the WSJ, Bavuudorj Tsogdorj, 43 years old and an exponent of the younger generation of Mongolian poets, expresses his belief that "his increasingly urbanized countrymen will eventually appreciate their nomadic tradition." He continues: "Younger poets are now writing with European thoughts and styles, but they will come back to Mongolian poetry and thoughts someday. At that time Mend-Ooyo will be really valuable." He adds: "Mend-Ooyo is Mongolia's poetry representative — he is a genuine nomadic poet."
