= Ochirbat =

Ochirbat (Mongolian: Очирбат) is a Mongolian personal name.

Prominent persons bearing this name:

- Gombojavyn Ochirbat (born 1929), Mongolian politician, head of the Mongolian People's Party from 1990 to 1991
- Punsalmaagiin Ochirbat (1942–2025), Mongolian politician, President of Mongolia from 1990 to 1997

== Patronymic ==
- Ochirbatyn Burmaa (born 1982), Mongolian female freestyle wrestler
- Ochirbatyn Dashbalbar (1957–1999), Mongolian writer and politician
- Ochirbatyn Nasanburmaa (born 1989), Mongolian female freestyle wrestler
