= Dariganga =

Dariganga may refer to:

- Dariganga Mongols, an eastern Mongol ethnic subgroup
- Dariganga, Sükhbaatar, a sum (district) in the Sükhbaatar aimag in Mongolia
