= Tömörtiin Ovoo Zinc Mine =

Zinc mine in Sükhbaatar District, Sükhbaatar Province, Mongolia

Coordinates: 46°46′57″N 113°19′35″E

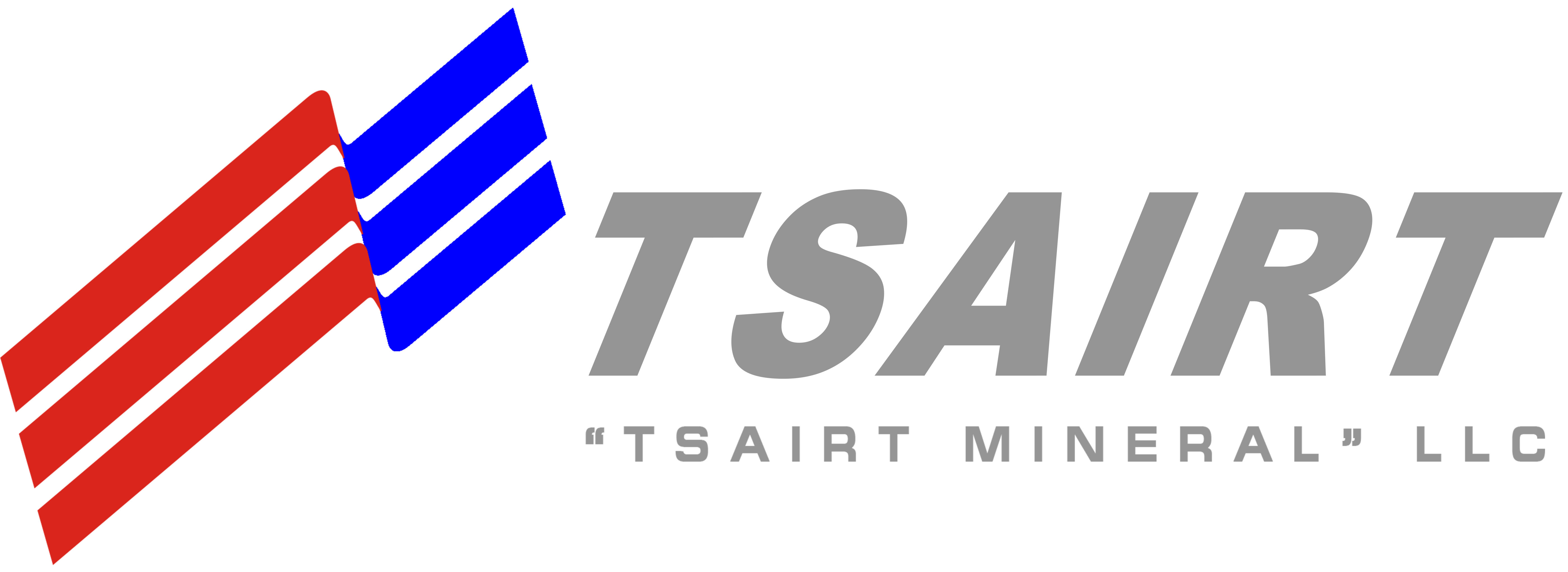
The logo of the joint venture company operating the mine

The Tömörtiin Ovoo Zinc Mine (Mongolian: Төмөртийн овоо, heap of iron) is a mining and dressing plant in the Sükhbaatar sum (district) of Sükhbaatar Province in eastern Mongolia. This mine is 40 km W from the sum center and 13 km N from the province capital Baruun-Urt.

It was officially put into production on August 28, 2005, with 300,000 tons ore dressed and 80,000 tons zinc concentrate produced per year. Zinc concentrate is transported from the mining site to the transfer railway station Sainshand and exported via the Trans-Mongolian Railway.

It was calculated in 1980 that the deposit possesses 70,572,290 tons of ore with an average grade of 13.67% of zinc by B+C reserve category which is equivalent to 1,034,860 tons of metallic zinc. In 1997 the Mongolian company Metallimpex LLC and China-based NFC entered into a Cooperation Agreement to jointly mine the deposit and established Tsairt Mineral LLC, a Mongol-Chinese Joint Venture.
