= Shiliin Bogd =

Mountain in Sükhbaatar, Mongolia

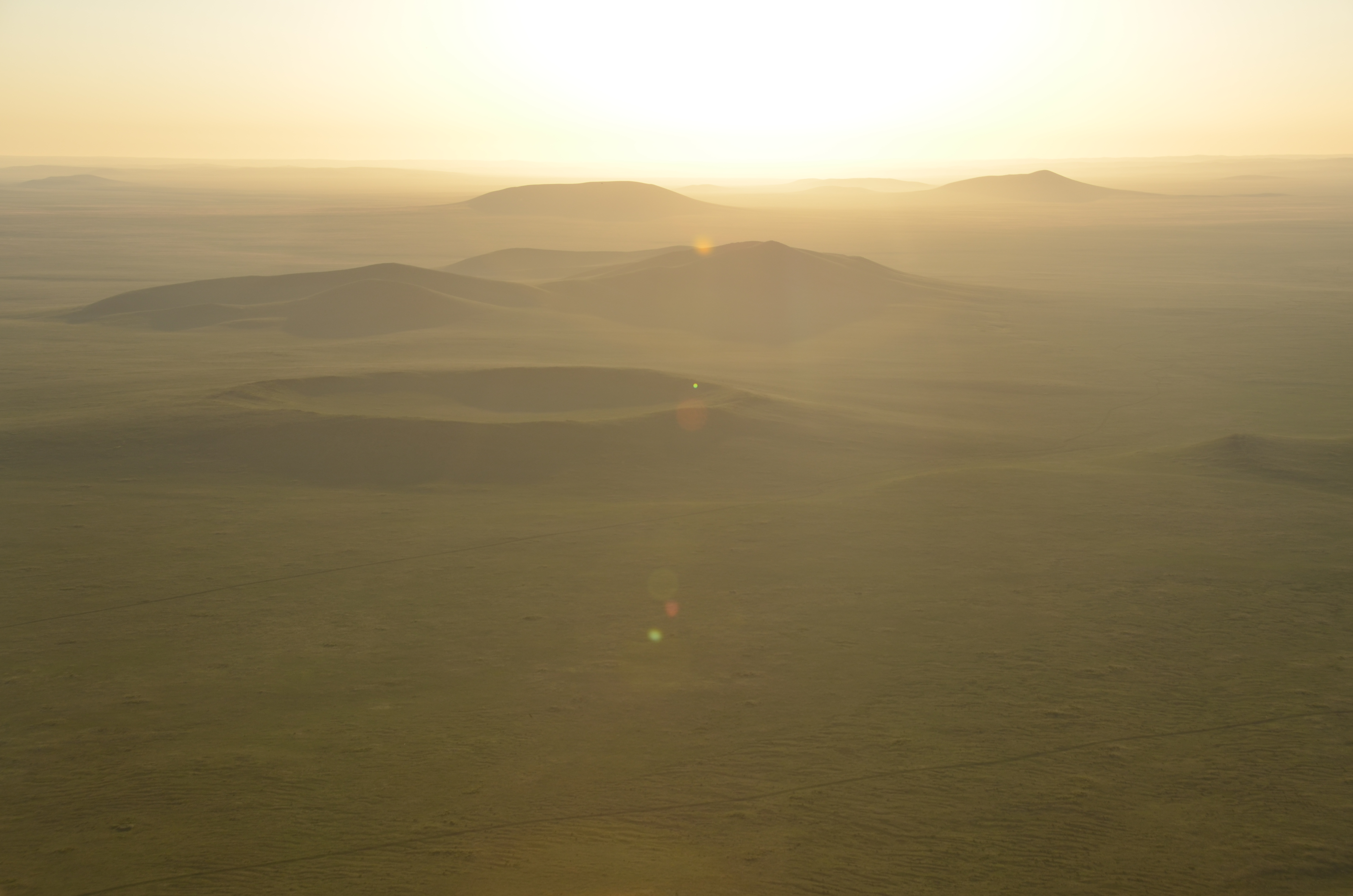
- View above Shiliin bogd

Highest point
- Elevation: 1,778 m (5,833 ft)
- Coordinates: 45°28′17″N 114°35′2″E

Geography
- Location within Mongolia
- Location: Mongolia

Geology
- Mountain type: extinct volcano

The Shiliin Bogd (Mongolian: Шилийн богд) is an extinct volcano in Sükhbaatar Province, Mongolia. The Shiliin Bogd 70 kilometer away from Altan Ovoo which in the center of Dariganga soum. The Shiliin Bogd is the highest peak in Sükhbaatar Province at 1,778 metres (5,833 ft) above sea level and has a crater of 2 kilometers wide and over 300 metres (980 ft) deep. Shiliin or Shil means there is less water thus there are fewer herders live in this area. The Shiliin Bogd is one of the most visited places for Mongolians especially for men for their belief.
