= Tümentsogt, Sükhbaatar =

District in Sükhbaatar Province, Mongolia

Coordinates: 47°34′30″N 112°21′06″E

Tümentsogt District Түмэнцогт сум ᠲᠦᠮᠡᠨᠴᠣᠭᠲᠤᠰᠤᠮᠤ
- District
- Interactive map of Tümentsogt District
- Country: Mongolia
- Province: Sükhbaatar Province
- Time zone: UTC+8 (UTC + 8)

Tümentsogt (Mongolian: Түмэнцогт) is a sum (district) of Sükhbaatar Province in eastern Mongolia. In 2009, its population was 2,404.

== Administrative divisions ==
The district is divided into four bags, which are:

- Bayan-Ovoo
- Bayantsagaan
- Bayantsogt
- Lkhumbe
