= Ochirbatyn Dashbalbar =

Mongolian writer and politician

- Born: February 10, 1957 Naran district of Sükhbaatar Aimag, Mongolia
- Died: October 16, 1999 (aged 42) Ulaanbaatar, Mongolia

Ochirbatyn Dashbalbar (Mongolian: Очирбатын Дашбалбар; 1957–1999) was a Mongolian writer and politician.

== Biography ==
=== Early life and education ===
Dashbalbar was born in the Naran district of Sükhbaatar Aimag, in the east of Mongolia, in 1957. He completed high school in Sükhbaatar and in 1984 graduated from the Maxim Gorky Literature Institute in Moscow. His relationship with the written word and with books was apparent from an early age, and it is said that he was interested in poetry even before he learnt properly to read. Indeed, friends report how he loved books and how he would always say that he would own a big library when he was grown up. As soon as he began to earn money, he spent all his income on books.

His fascination with poetry drew him into writing and, throughout his school years, he would carry notebooks with him, jotting down ideas for poetry. He studied literature in Moscow and devoted all his time to examining and understanding poetry, and to composing his own work.

=== Political career ===
After the fall of the Soviet Union in 1990, the influence of the free market reforms in Mongolia resulted in a combination of social poverty and political corruption within the country. Dashbalbar seems, before this point, to have been uninterested in politics, but during the first years of post-Soviet rule, he became more and more dissatisfied with the behavior of politicians, who he believed were misleading the electorate and acting primarily in their own interest, rather than in the interest of the people.

Having been elected to the State Great Khural, the parliament of Mongolia, in the first democratic elections, held in June 1992, as a representative of the Traditional United Conservative Party, Dashbalbar, already a popular literary figure, quickly became a popular politician. However, his popularity rendered him vulnerable to outside forces, in particular in the chaos surrounding the fall 1998 murder of the democratic leader Sanjaasürengiin Zorig, for which some people believed him directly responsible.

Indeed, throughout his time in politics, Dashbalbar was the subject of numerous accusations and insinuations, all of which proved groundless. There were subtle insinuations from certain political groups opposed to Dashbalbar that he might somehow have been involved in Zorig’s murder, and one cynical journalist sought to accuse him of sexual harassment, admitting only later that she had made this accusation so as to increase sales of her newspaper, which indeed was sold out and reprinted that same day. However, the vast popular support which his personal integrity, his lack of ostentation, and his stand against corruption gained him meant that he became gradually more and more vulnerable to such attacks.

Dashbalbar founded the Mongolian Tradition and Justice Party in February 1999. Following his death, the leadership of the party was assumed by his aide, Gantomoriin Galina, Dashbalbar's former aide.

=== Death and afterward ===
According to his son Gangaabaatar, during the last few months of his life, Dashbalbar began complaining that he was being poisoned by state-sanctioned officials. However some people believed that Dashbalbar was showing a clinical symptom of schizophrenia. On October 16, 1999, Dashbalbar was admitted to hospital, and eventually died later that night. The medical situation in Mongolia at that time made it impossible for a full postmortem to be carried out, and so the true cause of his death remains unknown. It seems that the public continues to believe that he had, like Zorig almost exactly a year before, been murdered, primarily because of his opposition to government corruption, but also, one might imagine, because of his national popularity.

His popularity was not engendered solely in his advocacy of the people, but also for the way in which he carried himself. In his essay “Dashbalbar Ochirbat and the Art of being Proud”, the poet and critic P Batkhuyag speaks about how Dashbalbar realised that his words were not pleasing to everyone, how he would joke, “My passionate spirit is tough on everyone. Starting from today, I shall have a pleasant spirit.” From what Batkhuyag says, it is clear that Dashbalbar realised that he was subject to attack from opposing forces and, moreover, that he was prepared and willing to stand up for his beliefs.

His political philosophy is sometimes summarized in this quotation, cited in an article written by the poet and scholar A Davaasambuu, and spoken after he had left the Traditional United Conservative Party for the Mongolian Traditional Justice Party:

“I have left my party, but I have not abandoned my motherland, my Mongolia. Mongolia needs its land. Without its land, it is no longer a nation. I will never align myself with those who betray their land and their nation.”

His poetry featured Buddhist imagery. Among the most famous works are poems "Love each other while living" (Амьдадаа бие биеэ хайрла), "Prophet of aeons and kalpas" (Mongolian: Галав эриний зѳнч) and "Zanabazar", which became the lyrics of a rock song.
