= Sükhbaatar, Sükhbaatar =

District in Sükhbaatar Province, Mongolia

Coordinates: 46°46′21″N 113°52′53″E

Sükhbaatar District Сүхбаатар сум ᠰᠦᠬᠡᠪᠭᠠᠲᠤᠷᠰᠤᠮᠤ
- District
- Interactive map of Sükhbaatar District
- Country: Mongolia
- Province: Sükhbaatar Province
- Time zone: UTC+8 (UTC + 8)

Sükhbaatar (Mongolian: Сүхбаатар) is a sum (district) of Sükhbaatar Province in eastern Mongolia. The Tömörtiin Ovoo Zinc Mine is 40 kilometres (25 mi) west of the sum center. In 2009, its population was 3,197.

The Sükhbaatar Province capital of Baruun-Urt is a small (50 km^{2} (19 sq mi)) enclave at the southwest part of Sükhbaatar sum, 50 kilometres (31 mi) from the sum center. It is named after Damdin Sükhbaatar.

== Administrative divisions ==
The district is divided into five bags, which are:

- Bayangol
- Khailaastai
- Khulgar
- Lanz
- Shinebulag
