= Baruun-Urt =

Capital city of Sükhbaatar Province, Mongolia

Coordinates: 46°40′53″N 113°16′49″E

Baruun-Urt District Баруун-Урт сум ᠪᠠᠷᠠᠭᠤᠨᠤᠷᠲᠤᠰᠤᠮᠤ
- District
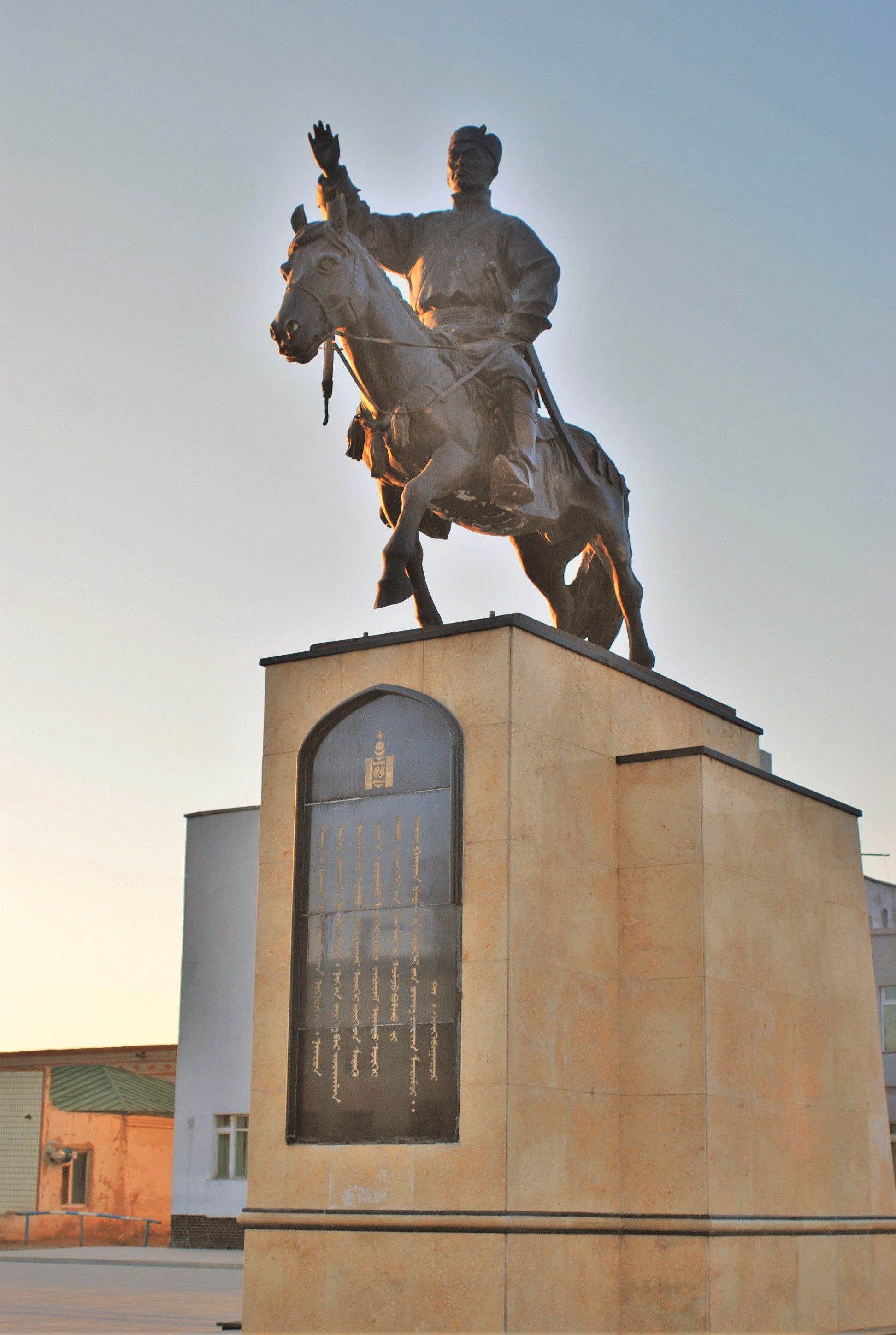
- Sükhbaatar Square Statue in Baruun-Urt
- Interactive map of Baruun-Urt District
- Country: Mongolia
- Province: Sükhbaatar Province
- Elevation: 981 m (3,219 ft)

Population (2017)
  - Total: 18,190
- Time zone: UTC+8 (UTC + 8)
- Climate: BSk

Baruun-Urt (Mongolian: Баруун-Урт; ᠪᠠᠷᠠᠭᠤᠨ ᠤᠷᠲᠤ, west-long) is a town in eastern Mongolia and the capital of Sükhbaatar Province. The town and its surroundings comprise a sum (district) of Sükhbaatar Province, with a population of 22,277. It forms an enclave within the surrounding Sükhbaatar sum.

Tömörtiin Ovoo Zinc Mine lies about 13 km north of the town. The Menen Steppe is east of the town, and the town acts as the primary way into the steppe.

== Demographics ==
Population of Baruun-Urt (town)
1959 est.	1969 census	1979 census	1989 census	2000 census	2010 census	2020 census	2025 census
6,000	8,000	11,600	16,100	15,133	14,296	19,284	22,277

According to the 2025 census, the sum of Baruun-Urt had 7,397 households and a population of 25,330. Children under fifteen years of age amounted to 9,090 people, or 35.9% of the population, while seniors over sixty-five years of age amounted to 1,576 people, or 6.22% of the population. There were 1,876 herdsmen in the sum. Of those 7,397 households, 2,893 (39.1%) had access to sanitation, and 4,458 (60.2%) did not have access to sanitation. Yurts comprised 2,880 (38.9%) of those households.

== Transportation ==
The Baruun-Urt Airport (UUN/ZMBU) has an unpaved runway, and local airlines operate a charter flights connecting the city to the capital when demand permits. The A2001 highway connects the town to the Millenium Highway near the town of Chinggis.

== Climate ==
Baruun-Urt experiences a cold semi-arid climate (Köppen BSk) with long, arid, and frigid winters and short, very warm summers.

Climate data for Baruun-Urt, elevation 981 m (3,219 ft), (1991–2020 normals, extremes 1960–present)
Month	Jan	Feb	Mar	Apr	May	Jun	Jul	Aug	Sep	Oct	Nov	Dec	Year
Record high °C (°F)	0.6 (33.1)	7.3 (45.1)	22.0 (71.6)	29.9 (85.8)	36.4 (97.5)	39.8 (103.6)	42.2 (108.0)	39.7 (103.5)	33.2 (91.8)	29.6 (85.3)	15.6 (60.1)	4.5 (40.1)	42.2 (108.0)
Mean daily maximum °C (°F)	−15.7 (3.7)	−9.7 (14.5)	1.0 (33.8)	12.0 (53.6)	20.2 (68.4)	25.5 (77.9)	27.7 (81.9)	26.0 (78.8)	19.7 (67.5)	9.7 (49.5)	−3.4 (25.9)	−13.2 (8.2)	8.3 (47.0)
Daily mean °C (°F)	−21.0 (−5.8)	−16.0 (3.2)	−5.9 (21.4)	4.6 (40.3)	12.6 (54.7)	18.7 (65.7)	21.3 (70.3)	19.3 (66.7)	12.5 (54.5)	2.7 (36.9)	−9.4 (15.1)	−18.3 (−0.9)	1.8 (35.2)
Mean daily minimum °C (°F)	−25.5 (−13.9)	−21.7 (−7.1)	−12.1 (10.2)	−2.4 (27.7)	5.4 (41.7)	12.4 (54.3)	15.6 (60.1)	13.1 (55.6)	5.9 (42.6)	−3.3 (26.1)	−14.6 (5.7)	−22.7 (−8.9)	−4.2 (24.5)
Record low °C (°F)	−39.7 (−39.5)	−38.0 (−36.4)	−31.1 (−24.0)	−18.9 (−2.0)	−10.3 (13.5)	0.0 (32.0)	4.0 (39.2)	0.0 (32.0)	−7.2 (19.0)	−23.0 (−9.4)	−31.3 (−24.3)	−36.4 (−33.5)	−39.7 (−39.5)
Average precipitation mm (inches)	2 (0.1)	2 (0.1)	2 (0.1)	5 (0.2)	17 (0.7)	41 (1.6)	60 (2.4)	46 (1.8)	22 (0.9)	6 (0.2)	3 (0.1)	3 (0.1)	209 (8.3)
Average precipitation days (≥ 1.0 mm)	1.2	1.4	1.4	1.7	4.2	5.9	8.3	6.3	3.8	2.0	2.1	2.3	40.6
Average relative humidity (%)	78.9	74.5	59.1	42.6	42.4	52.1	60.1	58.9	54.1	55.0	67.3	77.9	60.2
Mean monthly sunshine hours	203.3	216.4	263.5	274.6	304.5	303.0	298.9	290.4	280.0	245.2	208.2	183.2	3,071.2
Mean daily sunshine hours	6.6	7.7	8.5	9.2	9.8	10.1	9.6	9.4	9.3	7.9	6.9	5.9	8.4
Source 1: Pogoda.ru.net
Source 2: NOAA (sun, 1961-1990), Deutscher Wetterdienst (daily sun 1961-1990)
