= Ongon, Sükhbaatar =

Coordinates: 45°21′14″N 113°08′20″E

Ongon District Онгон сум ᠣᠩᠭ᠋ᠤᠨᠰᠤᠮᠤ
- District
- Interactive map of Ongon District
- Country: Mongolia
- Province: Sükhbaatar Province
- Time zone: UTC+8 (UTC + 8)

Ongon (Mongolian: Онгон "virgin") is a sum (district) of Sükhbaatar Province in eastern Mongolia.

== Geography ==
The district has a total area of 5,953 km^{2}.

== Administrative divisions ==
The district is divided into five bags, which are:

- Ikhbulag
- Khavirga
- Nuden
- Sharburd
- Tsungurug
