= General Election Commission of Mongolia =

Election commission of Mongolia

- Монгол Улсын Сонгуулийн Eрөнхий Xороо
- Logo of the General Election Commission of Mongolia

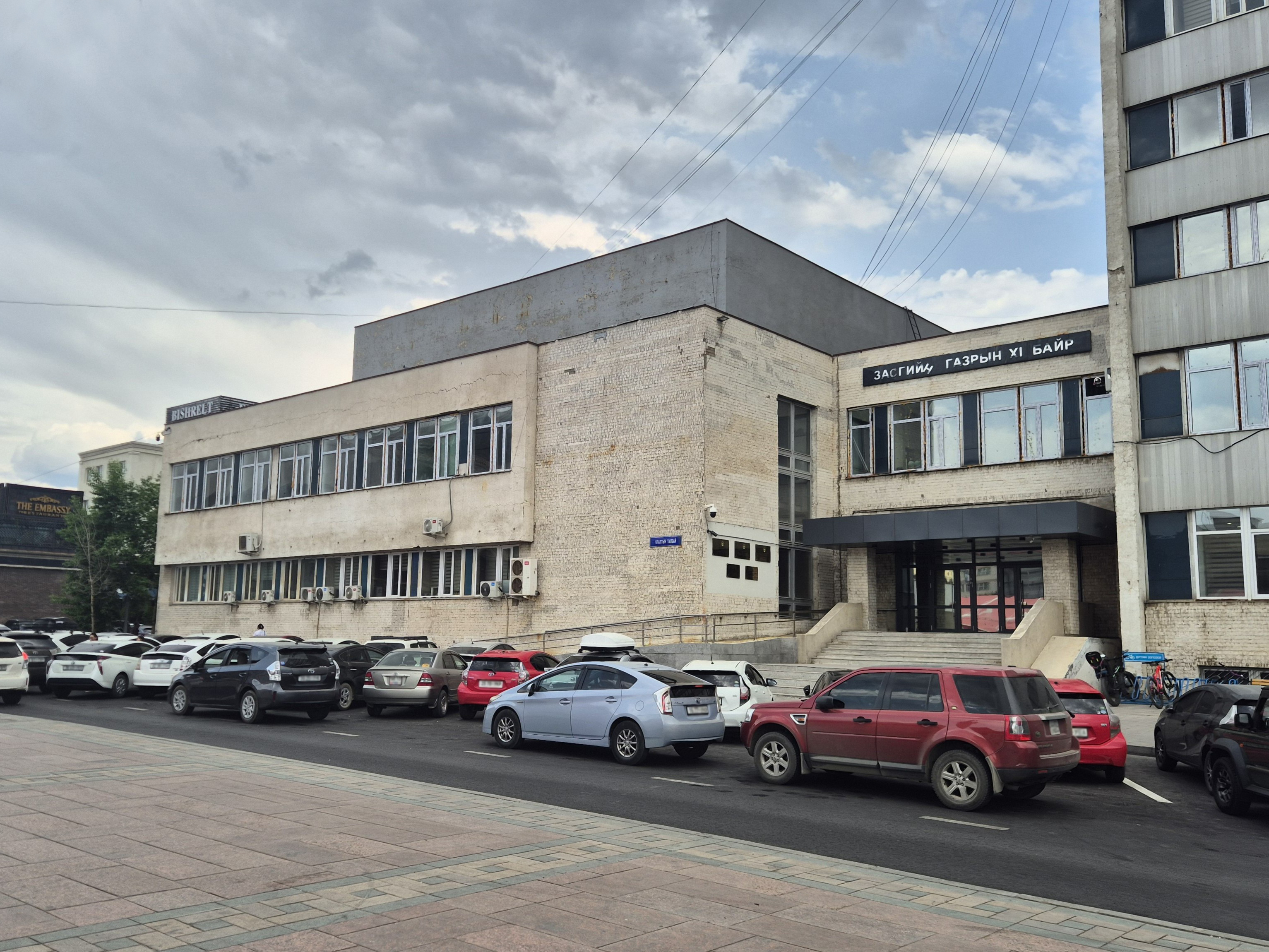

Agency overview
- Formed: 10 April 1992
- Jurisdiction: Mongolia
- Headquarters: Government Building XI, J.Sambuu St, Chingeltei, Ulaanbaatar
- Agency executive: Purveegiin Delgernaran, Chairperson of the GECM
- Website: Official website

The General Election Commission of Mongolia (GMEC; Mongolian: Монгол Улсын Сонгуулийн Eрөнхий Xороо abbreviated СЕХ) is the election commission of Mongolia mandated to hold all municipal, parliamentary, presidential elections and referendums nationwide.

== History ==
The commission was established in 10 April 1992 originally as a 15-member body. In 2025, the commission joined the Online Platform for Publishing Political Finance Data of the Open Government Partnership.

== See also ==
- Election commission for similar organizations in other countries
- Elections in Mongolia
- Politics of Mongolia
