= Tüvshinshiree, Sükhbaatar =

District in Sükhbaatar Province, Mongolia

Coordinates: 46°12′18″N 111°48′36″E

Tüvshinshiree District Түвшинширээ сум ᠲᠦᠪᠰᠢᠩᠰᠢᠷᠡᠭᠡᠰᠤᠮᠤ
- District
- Interactive map of Tüvshinshiree District
- Country: Mongolia
- Province: Sükhbaatar Province
- Time zone: UTC+8 (UTC + 8)

Tüvshinshiree (Mongolian: Түвшинширээ) is a sum (district) of Sükhbaatar Province in eastern Mongolia. In 2009, its population was 3,030.

== Administrative divisions ==
The district is divided into five bags, which are:

- Delgerkhaan
- Sergelen
- Uguumur
- Ulziit
- Unegt
