= Uulbayan, Sükhbaatar =

District in Sükhbaatar Province, Mongolia

Coordinates: 46°29′43″N 112°21′00″E

Uulbayan District Уулбаян сум ᠠᠭᠤᠯᠠᠪᠠᠶ᠋ᠠᠨᠰᠤᠮᠤ
- District
- Interactive map of Uulbayan District
- Country: Mongolia
- Province: Sükhbaatar Province
- Time zone: UTC+8 (UTC + 8)

Uulbayan (Mongolian: Уулбаян, Mountain rich) is a sum (district) of Sükhbaatar Province in eastern Mongolia. In 2009, its population was 2,883.

== Administrative divisions ==
The district is divided into five bags, which are:

- Bayan
- Delger
- Jargalant
- Javkhlant
- Tegsh
