= Asgat, Sükhbaatar =

District in Sükhbaatar Province, Mongolia

Coordinates: 46°21′53″N 113°34′44″E

Asgat District Асгат сум ᠠᠰᠠᠭᠲᠤᠰᠤᠮᠤ
- District
- Nickname: small country
- Interactive map of Asgat District
- Country: Mongolia
- Province: Sükhbaatar Province
- Time zone: UTC+8 (UTC + 8)

Asgat (Mongolian: Асгат) is a sum (district) of Sükhbaatar Province in eastern Mongolia. In 2009, its population was 1,806.

== Administrative divisions ==
The district is divided into four bags, which are:

- Dukhum
- Ikh-Uul
- Jargalant
- Ulziit
