= Naran, Sükhbaatar =

District in Sükhbaatar Province, Mongolia

Coordinates: 45°07′54″N 113°40′50″E

Naran District Наран сум ᠨᠠᠷᠠᠨᠰᠤᠮᠤ
- District
- Interactive map of Naran District
- Country: Mongolia
- Province: Sükhbaatar Province
- Time zone: UTC+8 (UTC + 8)

Naran (Mongolian: Наран, Sunny) is a sum (district) of Sükhbaatar Province in eastern Mongolia. In 2009, its population was 1,477.

== Administrative divisions ==
The district is divided into three bags, which are:

- Gun Khudag
- Naranbulag
- Tosongiin Gol
