= Dariganga, Sükhbaatar =

District in Sükhbaatar Province, Mongolia

Coordinates: 45°18′15″N 113°50′55″E

Dariganga District Дарьганга сум ᠳᠠᠷᠢᠭᠠᠩᠭ᠋᠎ᠠᠰᠤᠮᠤ
- District
- Interactive map of Dariganga District
- Country: Mongolia
- Province: Sükhbaatar Province
- Time zone: UTC+8 (UTC + 8)

Dariganga (Mongolian: Дарьганга) is a sum (district) of Sükhbaatar Province in eastern Mongolia. After the Xinhai Revolution which overthrew the Qing Dynasty, forces loyal to the independent Mongolian government established control in the area in March 1912. Jodbajab, the Qing and then Republic of China military official responsible for the area, attempted to retake it in August 1912, but was captured and taken prisoner, not to be released until 1915. During the Outer Mongolian Revolution of 1921, he was dispatched in another attempt to re-establish control in Dariganga, but was driven out by Soviet Kalmyk troops and local partisans; the territory would thenceforth remain part of the state of Mongolia.

== Administrative divisions ==
The district is divided into four bags, which are:

- Aman-Us
- Badrakh
- Ovoot
- Uud

== Tourist attractions ==
- Ganga Lake

== Notable natives ==
- Mend-Ooyo Gombojav, writer, poet and calligraphist
