= 1924 Mongolian parliamentary election =

Parliamentary elections were held in Outer Mongolia, officially the Mongolian People's Republic, following the death of the Bogd Khan in 1924, to elect the first Great Khural.

== Background ==
Following the Mongolian Revolution of 1921, the Mongolian People's Party took control of Outer Mongolia. A 20-member commission drafted a new constitution, which was modelled on the 1918 constitution of the Russian Soviet Federative Socialist Republic; the commission was chaired by Prime Minister Balingiin Tserendorj and supervised by Turar Ryskulov from Comintern. A 90-member Great Khural was to be elected to approve the new constitution.

== Results ==
Despite representatives of the Mongolian People's Party and the Youth League instructing people to vote for commoners, several princes were elected, including Dugarjav of Ikh Dulaan uul and Tseren-ochir of Tüsheet Khan. The princes were subsequently disqualified and re-runs held, although six princes subsequently became members. Nine of the elected members were lamas and seven were illiterate. All 90 elected candidates were men.

== Aftermath ==
The newly elected Great Khural convened on 8 November, although only 77 of the 90 members attended. Of those in attendance, 64 were members of the Mongolian People's Party or the Youth League. Navaandorjiin Jadambaa was elected Chairman of the Great Khural. The 1924 Constitution was approved in a unanimous vote on 26 November, which officially established a People's Republic. Subsequently, the Little Khural, a 30-member body that held supreme power between sessions of the Great Khural, and the Presidium of the Little Khural, a standing body of 5 members was also established.
