= Sükhbaatar Province =

Province (aimag) of Mongolia

Sükhbaatar Province Сүхбаатар аймаг ᠰᠦᠬᠡᠪᠠᠭᠠᠲᠤᠷᠠᠶᠢᠮᠠᠭ
- Province
- Hometown of Dued
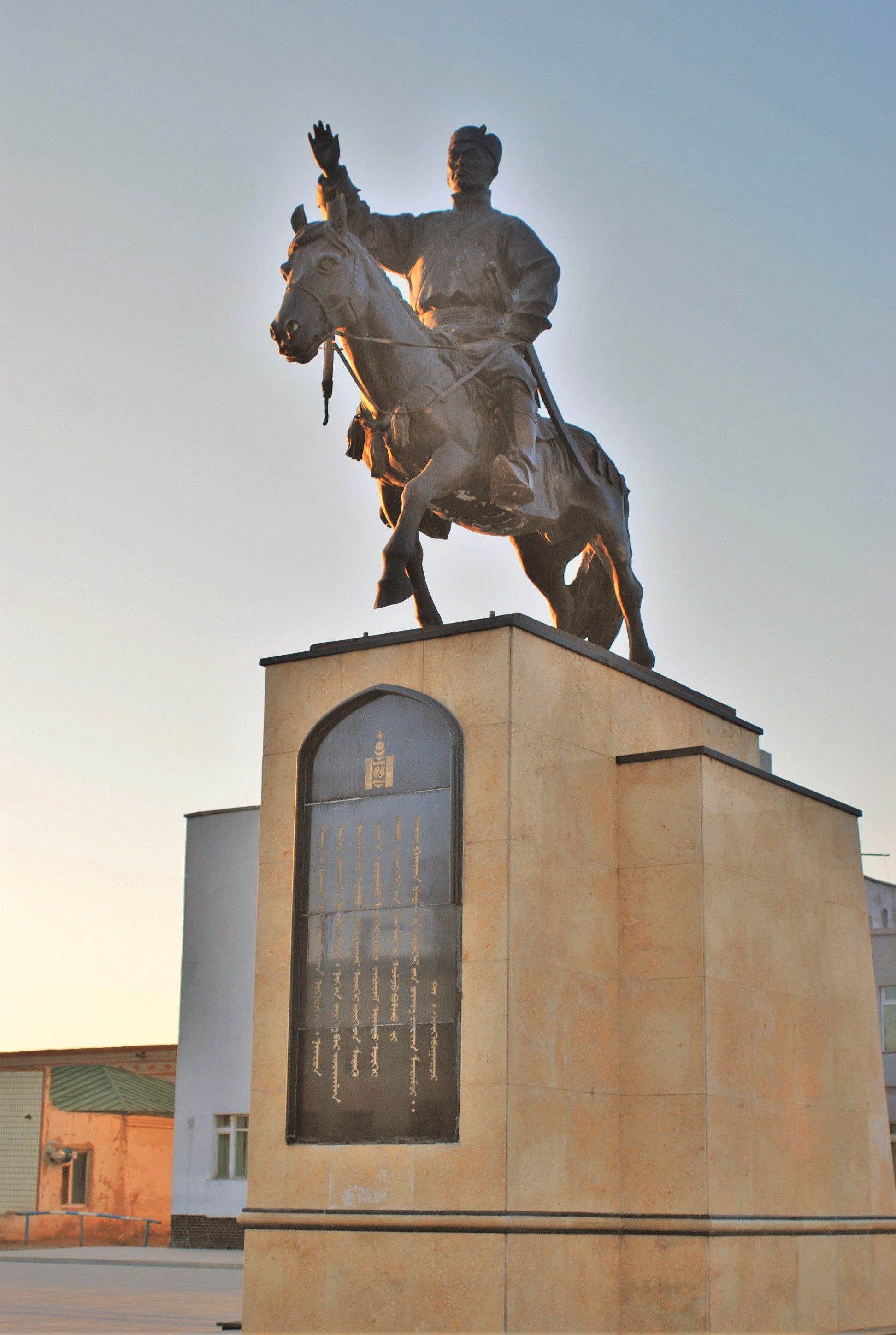
- Sükhbaatar Square Statue in Baruun-Urt

- Flag Coat of arms

- Coordinates: 46°41′N 113°17′E
- Country: Mongolia
- Settled: 1942
- Capital: Baruun-Urt

Area
  - Total: 82,287.15 km^{2} (31,771.25 sq mi)

Population (2017)60ail podvol
  - Total: 61,323
  - Density: 0.74523/km^{2} (1.9301/sq mi)

GDP
  - Total: MNT 771 billion US$ 0.2 billion (2022)
  - Per capita: MNT 11,761,520; US$ 3,766 (2022)
- Time zone: UTC+8
- Area code: +976 (0)151
- ISO 3166 code: MN-051
- Vehicle registration: СҮ_
- Website: sukhbaatar.mn

Sükhbaatar (Mongolian: Сүхбаатар, lit. Axe Hero) is one of the 21 aimags of Mongolia, located in the east of the country. Its capital is Baruun-Urt. It is named after Damdin Sükhbaatar.

== Population ==
Sükhbaatar aimag population
1950 est.	1956 census	1963 census	1969 census	1975 est.	1979 census	1981 est.	1989 census	1991 est.	1993 est.
27,800	30,700	32,100	35,300	39,900	43,000	44,600	50,800	57,408	56,085
1994 est.	1996 est.	1998 est.	2000 census	2002 est.	2004 est.	2005 est.	2008 est.	2009 est.	
57,546	56,534	55,523	55,511	54,529	53,935	52,768	53,785	54,363	

== Transportation ==
The Baruun-Urt Airport (UUN/ZMBU) has one unpaved runway and is served by regular flights to Ulaanbaatar.

== Administrative subdivisions ==
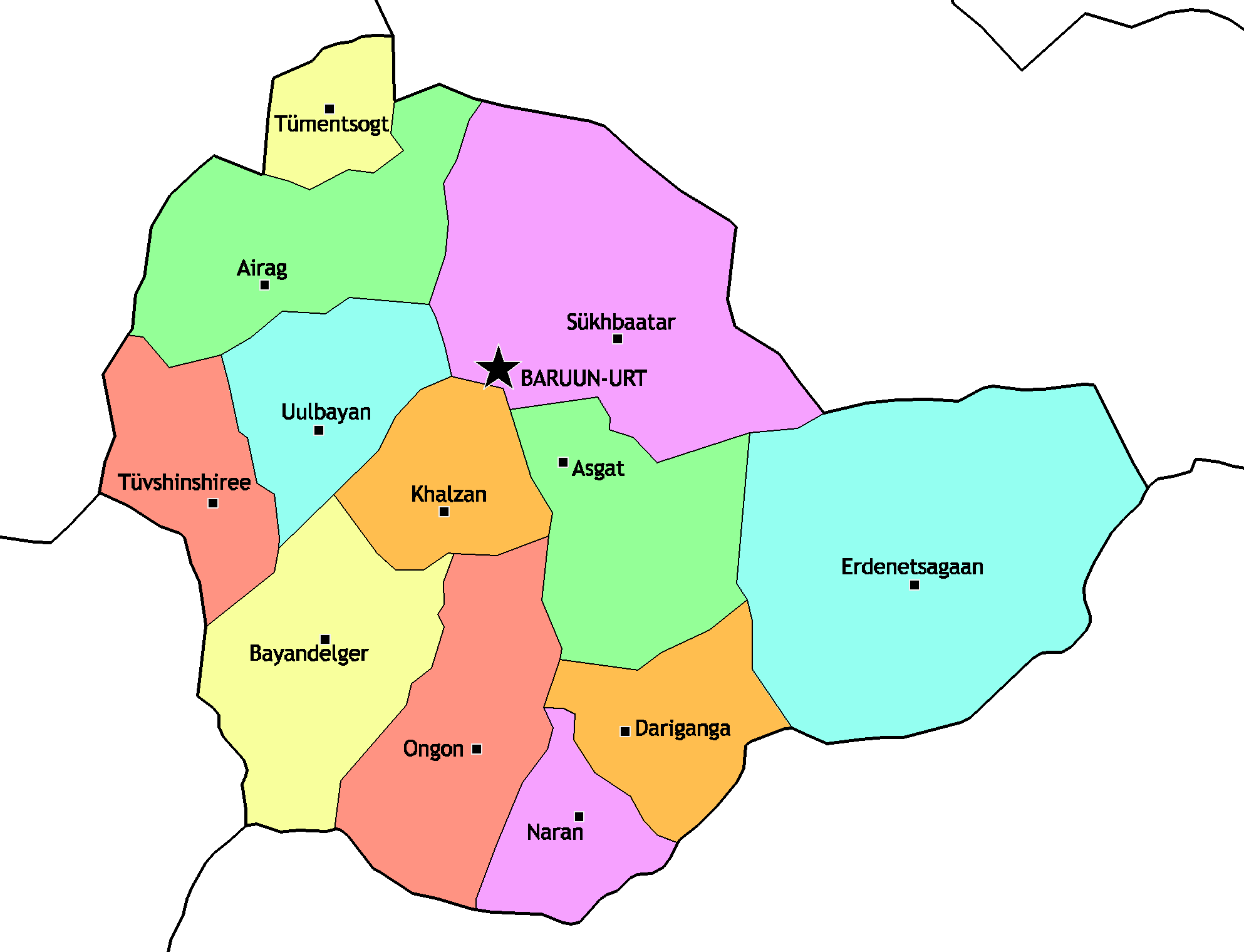
Sums of Sükhbaatar

The Aimag capital Baruun-Urt is geographically located within the Sükhbaatar sum but administered independently.

The Sums of Sükhbaatar aimag
Sum	Mongolian	Sum population 2008 est.	Sum population 2009 est.	Sum centre population 2009 est.
Asgat	Асгат	1,775	1,806	538
Baruun-Urt	Баруун-Урт	15,549	16,249	13,859^{*}
Bayandelger	Баяндэлгэр	4,560	4,568	1,169
Dariganga	Дарьганга	2,884	2,853	639
Erdenetsagaan	Эрдэнэцагаан	6,309	6,439	2,813
Khalzan	Халзан	1,622	1,598	566
Mönhhaan	Мөнххаан	4,335	4,213	1,189
Naran	Наран	1,466	1,477	336
Ongon	Онгон	3,638	3,646	1,261
Sükhbaatar	Сүхбаатар	3,263	3,197	631
Tümentsogt	Түмэнцогт	2,339	2,404	1,106
Tüvshinshiree	Түвшинширээ	3,035	3,030	610
Uulbayan	Уулбаян	3,010	2,883	766

* - the aimag capital Baruun-Urt

== Economy ==
In 2018, the province contributed to 1.47% of the total national GDP of Mongolia.

== See also ==
- Dariganga Mongols
