= Noyon Khutagt Danzanluvsantudev =

Mongolian tulku

Noyon Khutagt Dunzanluvsantudev

Personal life
- Born: Ugtakhbayar; 1984 (age 40–41); Khövsgöl, Dornogovi, Mongolia

Religious life
- Religion: Tibetan Buddhism
- Temple: Khamar Monastery
- School: Gelug
- Lineage: Noyon Khutagt

Senior posting
- Period in office: 29 December 2012 – present
- Predecessor: Gendensaivan

Noyon Khutagt Dunzanluvsantudev (Mongolian: Ноён Хутагт Данзанлувсантүдэв; born 1984) is a Mongolian tulku who is the ninth and current reincarnation of the Noyon Khutagt.

== Early life ==
The ninth incarnation of the Noyon Khutagt was born in 1984 to a herder family in the Khövsgöl sum of Dornogovi Province. He is the youngest of seven children. His parents named him Ugtakhbayar, which means "Forthcoming Joy". In 1994, when he was 10 years old, he became a disciple of Jigmed-Osor Gavji, a senior local monk who had helped rebuild the Ulgin Monastery (Mongolian: Өлгийн хийд) in Dornogovi, and started his dharma education.

He studied at Khamar Monastery in Dornogovi until 2003 when he went to south India to study as a disciple, however he soon returned to Mongolia due to ill health. He studied under Geshe Losang and received Getsul vows in December, 2003. He then bore the name Losang mThu-stobs.

By the decision of Khamar Monastery, he joined Drikung Kagyu Institute to take care of younger monks who were sent there from Khamar Monastery in 2005.

As soon as young monks became able to survive on their own, he returned to Mongolia. He graduated from Zanabazar Buddhist University, a part of Gandantegchinlen Monastery in Ulaanbaatar, in 2010, while managing Khamar Monastery to send boys to India for dharma studies.

When the 14th Dalai Lama recognized him as the Ninth Noyon Khutagt on 29 December 2012, he was acting as chief monk for reviving and rebuilding Khamar Monastery's dharma activities and temples. He was enthroned in a ceremony that took place from 1-7 March 2013. As of October 2016, the Ninth Noyon Khutagt was studying at Drepung Gomang Monastic University.
