= Dulduityn Danzanravjaa =

Mongolian polymath (1803–1856)

- ᠳᠤᠯᠳᠤᠶᠲ‍ᠢ‍ᠨ ᠳᠠᠨᠽᠠᠨᠷᠠᠸᠵᠠᠠ
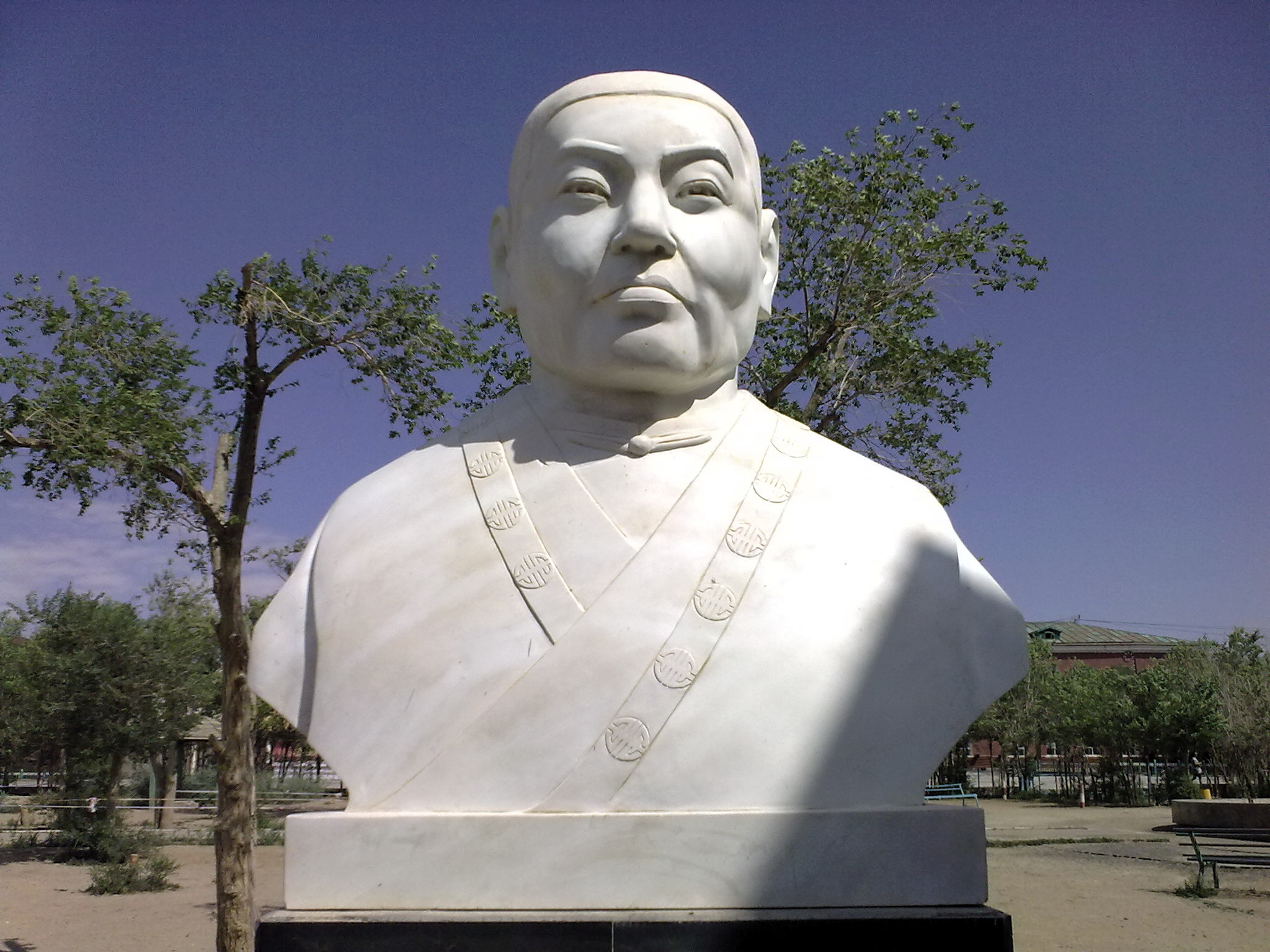
- Statue of Danzanravjaa in Sainshand, Dornogovi Province, Mongolia

Personal life
- Born: 1803 Dornogovi Province, Mongolia
- Died: 1856 (aged 52–53)

Religious life
- Religion: Tibetan Buddhism
- School: Nyingma
- Lineage: Noyon Khutagt

Senior posting
- Teacher: Ishdoniilhundev
- Period in office: 1812–1856
- Predecessor: Jamyang-Oidovjamts
- Successor: Luvsan-Dondov

Dulduityn Danzanravjaa (Note: Mongolian: Дулдуйтын Данзанравжаа Mongolian script: ᠳᠤᠯᠳᠤᠶᠲ‍ᠢ‍ᠨ ᠳᠠᠨᠽᠠᠨᠷᠠᠸᠵᠠᠠ) (1803–1856) was a Mongolian polymath who variously worked as a writer, composer, painter, Buddhist scholar, physician. He was the fifth reincarnation (tulku or hutagt) of Noyon Khutagt, a Nyingma tulku lineage based in the Gobi Desert.

== Name ==
Dulduityn Danzanravjaa's name is a Mongolian adaptation of the last part of the Tibetan name Lobsang Tenzin Rabgye, given to Danzanravjaa by the 4th Jebtsundamba Khutuktu after he was recognised as a tulku in 1812. His name is sometimes simply written as "Danzan Ravjaa", with a space. There are several versions concerning the origins and use of "Dulduityn".

== Life ==
Danzanravjaa was born in the Tüsheet Khan aimag's Gobi Mergen Banner, in what is today Khövsgöl sum of Dornogovi aimag on 25th day of mid-winter month by lunar calendar. His family was poor, and his mother died while he was still young. He and his father survived by begging and singing until 1809, when he was accepted as a disciple of Ishdoniilhundev Rinpoche at Ongiin Monastery where the boy received the name of Luvsandanzanravja and the vows of a Buddhist layman. From an early age he showed much talent for music and poetry, wrote his first famous impromptu Khurmast Tenger (the Heavens) at age of seven. The literary and oratorical abilities in the boy made the locals to believe he was a tulku, so they appealed to the higher clergy for recognition of his next incarnation.

Danzanravjaa was found by the personal attendant of the 4th Noyon Khutagt in 1809. It was not possible to enthrone Danzanravjaa as the 5th Noyon Khutagt because of a ban on recognition of Noyon Khutagt reincarnations by the Qing dynasty, which then controlled Mongolia. He was enthroned as the Avshaa Gegeen in Ongiin Gol (present-day Saikhan-Ovoo. Dundgovi) Monastery by Ishdoniilhundev. While studying at the monastery, the boy showed himself brilliantly, and in 1811 was publicly recognized by his spiritual advisor Ishdoniilhundev as the reincarnation of the geshe Navaana, or the Asvaa-gegen. The identity of the incarnation was confirmed by Palden Tenpai Nyima, 7th Panchen Lama and Janjah-hutuhta Yeshe Tenpay Gyaltsen; In Urga (present day Ulaanbaatar), Danzanravjaa was introduced to the 4th Jebtsundamba Khutuktu, theocratic leader of the country, who granted him the title of "Brave" (Mongolian: чин зоригт, romanized: chin zorigt) and the right to use certain status items.

In 1817, Danzanravjaa moved to the Dolnuur monastery, where he studied for three years. His curriculum included various Buddhist and medical teachings and also the work of the Tibetan poet Rompo Calden Gyatso. He received tantric initiations in the monasteries Choyling and Badgar during this time.

After finishing the course of traditional Buddhist education in 1820, Danzanravjaa founded the monasteries Khamar Monastery (Uver-Bajasgalant), Choylogiin and Burdeni, which became the centers of culture, art and education. In 1821, he founded the Lamrim datsan at Khamar Monastery where he taught his scholastic ideas, in 1822 - the temple of Labran, in 1823 – the temple of Agvaa and the temple devoted to fierce deities – protectors, and in 1827 the Kalachakra temple.

In 1840s, Danzanravjaa founded a number of monasteries throughout the Gobi region of Mongolia (now some of them are located in Inner Mongolia), for example, the Three Monasteries of Mount Galbyn (Ulaan-Sahiusnii, Tsagaan-tolgoin and Demchigiin) in modern-day Khanbogd, Ömnögovi. He personally took part in the development of architectural projects for these construction projects.

Many monasteries he established became religious and cultural centers and served as religious crossroads between Mongolia, China, and Tibet during his lifetime. Other than his writings, he was also known for his syncretic combination of Yellow Hat and Red Hat sect beliefs. As a member of the Nyingma school, Danzanravjaa was not required to refrain from alcohol or sexual intimacy, and he was well known for his love of both. He frequently referred to the ecstasy he experienced with his lovers and took two wives. He also referred to himself as a "boozer" (sokhtakhu) in his writing.

Danzanravjaa paid special attention to Khamar Monastery which he founded, where in addition to the buildings standard to the Mongolian Buddhist monastery, he organized:

- a theater called the Moon Cuckoo (Saran khukhuu) in 1832 which was called "datsan of describing lives" (Mongolian: намтар дуулах дацан) with a touring troupe. The plays were a combination of songs, dance and story telling in the comedic and melodramatic genres that Danzanravjaa personally staged based on the Mongolian choreography and ceremonies as well as foreign drama elements.
- a public library and museum in 1840 at so-called the "exhibition temple" (Mongolian: Гиваадин Равжаалин, romanized: Givaadin Ravjaalin). This temple housed about ten thousand items including Buddhist teaching works, theatrical works, his personal art works, tankas as well as gifts from Mongolian and foreign lords and officials and various curious things he collected during his many domestic and foreign trips. In the public library, visitors could regularly listen to specially trained readers reciting books aloud.
- a general education school for children. His school called the "children's datsan" (Mongolian: хүүхдийн дацан) represented the opportunity for children, boys and girls alike, regardless of their social origin, to master the educational program – Mongolian and Tibetan language and literature, mathematics, natural science, history, music and dance. Graduates of the school received a stamped certificate of education, and often went on to work in the theater company as actors, singers, costumers and decorators as well as teachers at the school.

== Death ==
Danzanravjaa died under mysterious circumstances. It is often claimed that he was murdered by poisoning, which is possible since he had many enemies during his lifetime. He was unpopular with the Manchu rulers of the Qing dynasty and the widow of a local ruler. However, there is no definitive evidence that his death was from murder, suicide, or simply illness.

== Legacy ==
After Danzanravjaa's death one of his disciples, Sh. Balchinchoijoo (Ishlodon), collected his manuscripts and relics and served as their curator (Takhilch), a role that passed down to his male heirs. After the Mongolian Revolution of 1921 the collection was buried for safekeeping in the mountains, and a map to the location continued to pass within the family of Curators. The collection remained buried until the present curator, Zundoi Altangerel, unearthed 24 boxes of manuscripts and relics in 1991 and transferred them to a small museum in Sainshand. Another 22 boxes remained buried. In 2009, Altangerel and Austrian archaeologist Michael Eisenriegler unearthed two more crates in an event that was simulcast on the Internet on TV.

In 2005 a digital archive of his original work was created with funding from the British Library's Endangered Archives Programme. It consists of 43,350 TIFF files. The project remains incomplete, however, since a number of the crates have been loaned out and not returned.

In 2025, the name of a newly described fossil mammal genus discovered in the Gobi Desert, Ravjaa, was derived from Danzanravjaa's name.

== Bibliography ==
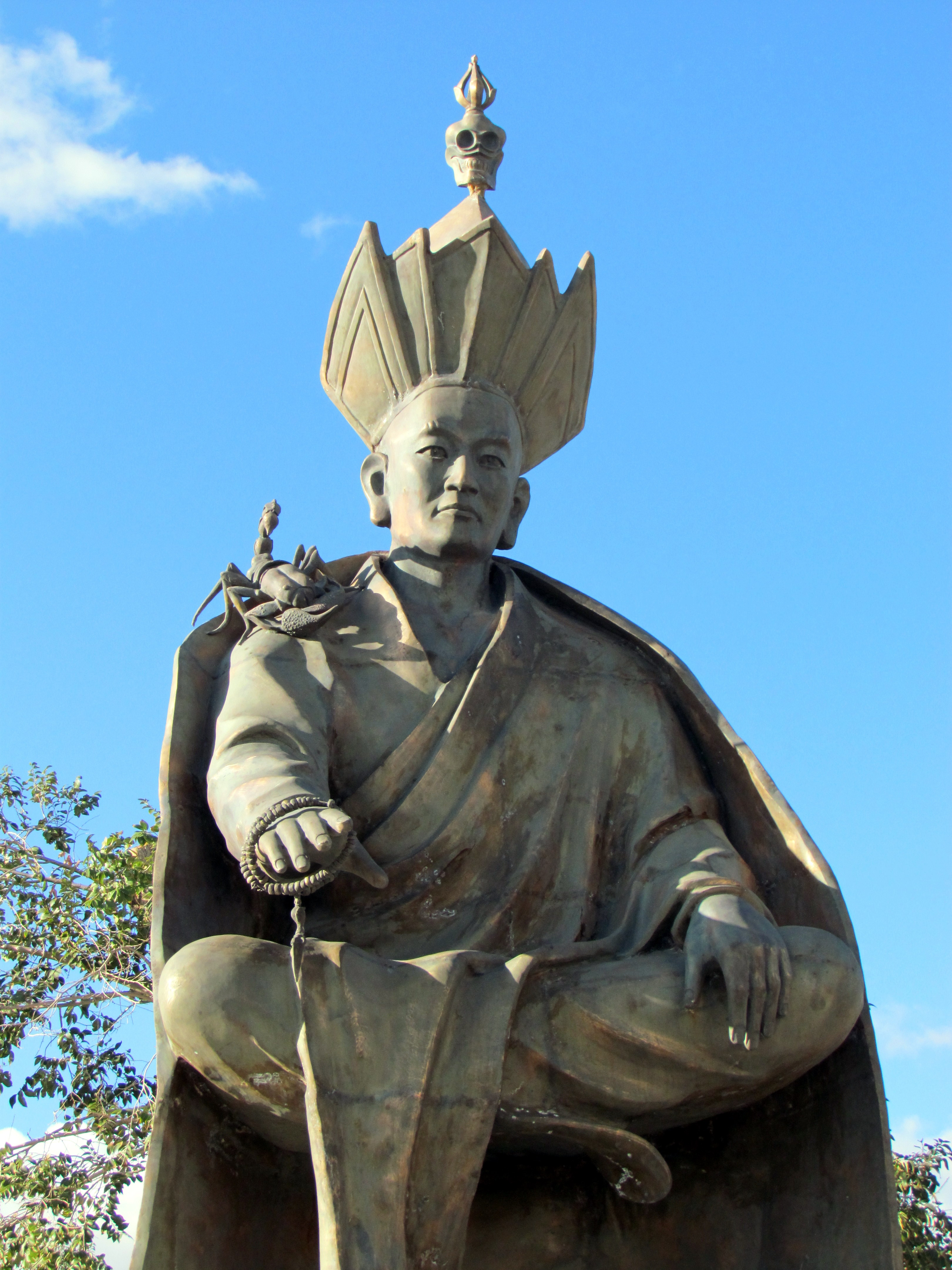
Monument to Danzanravjaa, Danzanravjaa Museum, Sainshand, Mongolia

There are over 300 poems, 100 songs, numerous religious paintings, and a variety of Buddhist, philosophical, medical and astronomical treatises, theses and monographs written by Danzanravjaa in Tibetan and Mongolian, of which 170 works in Mongolian and over 180 in Tibetan have survived to this day in full text and are now housed at the National Archives of Mongolia, Danzanravjaa Museum, archives of National University of Mongolia and several other institutions.

Danzanravjaa's poetry is strongly influenced by classical Indian and Tibetan literature. Among the most famous of his poetic works, some that are still loved, sung and referred widely include "Ulemjiin Chanar" ("Perfect qualities"), Uvgun shuvuu ("Old bird"), "Urhan khongor salhi" ("Warm breeze"), "Salj yadah setgel" ("Unbroken soul"), "Ichig, ichig" ("Shame, shame!"), etc. Other notable works include:

- The ten-volume operetta Tale of the Moon Cuckoo (Saran kökögen-ü namtar), which satirized corrupt individuals in the society he lived in. It is also intended to be performed for a month by over 100 actors and 60 musicians.
- Yertunts Avgain Jam (The Way of the World), a pessimistic poem purportedly written as he was dying.

The songs, verses and instructions of Danzanravjaa are characterized by their strong criticism of the contemporary society of Mongolia. Being a commoner by origin, Danzanravjaa could not bear to look at the hypocrisy around him, denouncing those who "help themselves, not helping others and criticize others without criticizing themselves" as well as their apparent guise of ignorance and duplicity, and ridiculing them. On the other hand, his social satire and criticism bear the spirit of the Buddhist doctrine of anitya (impermanence).
