= Noyon Khutagt =

Buddhist monk in Gobi, Mongolia

The Noyon Khutagt (Mongolian: Hоён Xутагт) is a monk of the Nyingma school of Tibetan Buddhism in the Gobi region of Mongolia. The present Noyon Khutagt is believed to be the ninth incarnation of the original Mongolian Noyon Khutagt, who himself was believed to be a reincarnation of a much earlier person in Tibetan Buddhist history.

== Tradition ==
According to oral traditions, nine reincarnations of Noyon Khutagts in Mongolia were preceded by 33 reincarnations in Tibet and India, the first of whom is believed to have lived in Tibet about 2,000 years ago. It is believed that these reincarnations are due to the Buddhist deity Hayagriva, known as Tamdrin Yansang Yidam in Mongolian.

Altangerel Perle mentioned in his work that a Tibetan lama called Bodon Chogloi Namgyal reincarnated as three different lamas at the same time in Mongolia. According to some biographies, the Gobi Noyon Khutagts were reincarnations of Sanjye-palsen. Debate continues as to who exactly Bodon Choklai Namgyal and Sangya Palsang were, and how they were connected to the Gobi Noyon Khutagts.

When the first Jetsundampa, Undur Gegeen Zanabazar (the Highest Rinpoche) was in his twenties and Ikh Khuree was established, Sonom Daichin Khoshuuch (1640-1670), who was a descendant of Abtai Sain Khan, traveled to Baruun-zuu (Lhasa) and requested a lama (spiritual teacher) for people to regard as root guru and a specific deity for practice from the Panchen Lama. Thus, the Panchen Lama sent Sanjye-palsen as a spiritual teacher and a statue of Odsergocha for worship and practice to Mongolia. This is recorded as:

Sonom Daichin Khoshuuch invited Sanjaibalsan [Sanjye-palsen] lama as the main guru for our khoshuu (‘Mergen Van’ County) from Baruun-zuu in the eleventh year of the Shunzhi (1644-1661) Emperor of the Qing Dynasty or the wooden horse year (1654). A Palace was built for him and daily ‘pujas’ called, “Khenderabjailing” started in the fifth year of the Kangxi (1662-1722) Emperor of the Qing Dynasty (1666)… The National Archive of Mongolia, FA-3, Account-1, Preservation Unit-1011

Here ‘our khoshuu’ refers to the former ‘Mergen van’ County of the Tusheet Khan province of Mongolia. It was a big county that covered the present-day Khövsgöl, Khatanbulag, Sulin Kheer, Ulaanbadrakh, Altanshiree, Saikhandulaan, Khar-Airag, Ikhkhet, and Bayanjargalan counties of Dornogovi Province as well as Khanbogd County of Ömnögovi Province.

The next reincarnation of Sanjye-palsen lama was Agvaangonchig (Navaan Dendev), who is renowned as the first Noyon Khutagt of Mongolia. After the statue of Odsergocha was brought, the Mobile Temple on wheels (a ‘ger’ temple mounted on a wheeled stage, like in Chinggis Khan’s times) was built as Agvaangonchig’s residence. This temple was renowned as the Noyon Khutagt’s ‘Khuree Urguu’ which means ‘residential temple’ or ‘palace’.

Later, the First Noyon Khutagt, Agvaangonchig, visited Lhasa in a wooden snake year of the eleventh cycle of the lunar calendar (1665), and requested permission from the Fifth Dalai Lama to establish a new monastery. After his return from Lhasa, in a fire horse year (1666), the First Noyon Khutagt established a temple and named it ‘Khindurabjaaling’ . It became renowned as ‘Khuree Khural’ in the beginning and as ‘Khuree Aimag’ later on. Much later, the Fourth Noyon Khutagt Jamyan-Oidovjamts established the Yidam Temple right after he had brought Yansan Yidam from Lhasa.”

A text entitled “The Origin of the Khalkha Noyon Khutagts”, written in classic Mongolian scripts, is among various items preserved in our era. This text corroborates some of the above-mentioned information. It contains a list of names of the seven reincarnations of Noyon Khutagts in Mongolia and the thirty-one previous reincarnations in India and Tibet in chronological order. Paintings have been found of each of these reincarnations as Buddhas. These paintings can be regarded as source material on the origins of the Mongolian Gobi Noyon Khutagts and their previous reincarnations in India and Tibet.

== Incarnations of Noyon Khutagts ==
1. Bodon Chogloinamgyal (Po-ston phyogs-las rnam-rgyal)
2. Zanadhara (dza-na dha-ra)
3. Genen Lhamo Lanaamo
4. Zanyon Heruka (btsan-smyon he-ru-ka)
5. Lodoidonsonrabdan (blo-gros don-zang rab-brtan)
6. Janchubsemba Jila dorjelanaamo
7. Zanadharalamo
8. Lopen Dagpa dorje
9. Shivaaryi
10. Dubchen Guguryi (grub-chen ku-ku-ri)
11. Lopen Sakyashyinen (slobs-dpon shakya-bshes)
12. Agiivanchug (ngag-gi dbang-phyugs)
13. Sesherivaa
14. Tudevbudhashri (grub-thob budha-shr’i)
15. Lochen Vairochana (blo-chen be-ro-tsa-na)
16. Danaglam (rta-nag bla-ma)
17. Serjebzunba (Ser rje-btsun-pa)
18. Dubchen Namkhaidorj (grub-chen nam-mkh’ rdorje)
19. Tudev-Dajir (grub-thob md’-‘byar)
20. Tudevdarchentsanachir
21. Lamashan (bla-ma zhang)
22. Danagdorje
23. Karmarolpaidorje (karma rol-pa-yi rdorje)
24. Ronsomchoi (rong-zom chos)
25. Nyamral (nyang-ral)
26. Lodoisengii (blo-gros sengge)
27. Tsarchen (tshar-chen)
28. Zanindraa (dza-nyin dha-ra)
29. Sereravsi (sre-rab-si)
30. Gungaadorje (kun-dg’ rdorje)
31. Sangyapalsan (sangs-rgyas dpal-bzang)

These are listed as Noyon Khutagt's previous incarnations in India and Tibet. Some of these names are apparently names of mahasiddhas renowned in India and Tibet.

== Gobi Noyon Khutagts ==
The first Noyon Khutagt to be identified among Gobi Buddhists was Agvangonchig, in 1622.

Generally speaking, Gobi Noyon Khutagts were among the most influential Mongolian Rinpoches in Mongolia, China, and other countries. Besides their dharma education and deeds, they were holders of the Governor's stamp for their own Banner, which of their disciples made up the entire administration unit, during both the regimes of Manchu Qing Dynasty and Bogd Khan, the Eighth Jetsundampa, of Mongolia.

=== Agvangonchig ===
The first Gobi Noyon Khutagt Agvangonchig (ngag-dbang dkon-mchog) was born in a water dog year (1622) of the 10th cycle (sixty years) of the lunar calendar as the first son of the Khalkha prince Sonom Daichin. The First Noyon Khutagt studied in Tashi Lhunpo Monastery for 30 years from age 15. When he was 45 years old, he came back to Mongolia and established Amgalan (which means peace or bliss) Monastery (also known as “Olon Khuree”) in a fire horse year (1666) of the 11th cycle of the lunar calendar. He lived and spread the Dharma in the Mongolian Gobi region and died at age 82 in a wooden monkey year (1704). He was buried in a tomb at a place called Gua teeg (on top of ‘Burkhan’ heap in present Khuvsgul county of Dornogobi Province).

=== Jamyan-dambee-jantsan ===
Noyon Khutagt Jamyan-dambee-jantsan (’jam-dbyangs bstan-pa’i rgyal-mtshan) was born as a son of an ordinary nomad by the name of Sunder in a wooden monkey year of the 12th cycle of the lunar calendar (1704). This lama was a great practitioner of tantric meditation and died in a water pig year of the 12th cycle (1743) at the age of 40. His body was placed in a special temple at Choi-ling Monastery (at the site of Khan Bayanzurkh Mountain).

=== Jamyan-danzan ===
Noyon Khutagt Jamyandanzan (’jam-dbyangs bstan-‘dzin) was born as a son of Tseden Mergen Zasag (a county governor) in a wooden mouse year of the 12th cycle (1744). This Noyon Khutagt was educated in all Buddhist fields of knowledge. In a fire dog year (1766), when he was 23 years old, he offered presents to the Manchu Emperor with the request to build a monastery in the Gobi region. He died in an earth mouse year of the 13th cycle (1768), at 25 years old . His body was enshrined in the Temple of Khan Bayanzurkh Mountain (Tulgat Mountain).

=== Jamyang-Oidovjamts ===
Noyon Khutagt Jamyang-Oidovjamts (Tibetan: jam-dbyangs dngos-grub rgya-mtsho) was born as a son of Rinchendorj, the governor of Selenge Province, in 1765. At age 13, he was enthroned on the lion throne of Khashaat monastery, which had been bestowed on him by a Manchu Emperor. This Noyon Khutagt was accused of murdering the Manchu Emperor’s son-in-law (although people believed that he had crushed an evil spirit) while traveling to Erdene Zuu Monastery. Thus, he was taken to Beijing by order of the Emperor and imprisoned for some time. Finally, when he was traveling back to the Gobi he was murdered at a place called “Tsuurai”.

=== Danzanravjaa ===
Noyon Khutagt Dulduityn Danzanravjaa was born in 1803 into a poor family in Shuvuun Shand, now part of Dornogovi Province, and took the vows of a monk at age six. He was identified as the reincarnation of the fourth Noyon Khutagt at age nine. An exceptional student, he returned to his birthplace at age sixteen and began to build Khamar Monastery. He developed his own tantric practice, attracted many students, and gave many teachings to the local nomadic herding community. His relationship with the local Qing rulers became increasingly tense - when he died at age 53 in 1856, there was a widespread rumour that he had been poisoned.

Among both religious and secular writers and scholars of Mongolia at the time, Danzanravjaa stands out for his humour, wisdom, and popular tone. He gradually mastered written Mongolian and Tibetan languages and became a celebrated poet, with his work still enjoyed by Mongolians. In addition to being the Noyon Khutagt and a poet, he was also an artist, composer, educator, dramaturge, and functioned as a statesman of the Gobi. He was continually at odds with the Qing occupation of Mongolia. Unlike other high-ranking tulkus, he never went to Tibet; his understanding of Buddhism was entirely nomadic and Mongolian. Although he wrote poetry in Tibetan, his teachings were delivered in Mongolian. In his capacity as a religious leader, he promoted the Mongolian language and culture, and the secular education of both boys and girls.

Danzanravjaa was a controversial figure during his lifetime, given his public fondness for excessive drinking and the company of young women. He was also referred to as the sogtuu ('drunk') reincarnation of the Noyon Khutagt.

=== Luvsan-dondov ===
Noyon Khutagt Luvsan-dondov (blo-bzang don-grub) was born as a son of Myagmar, a Tibetan national and younger brother of Seventh Jetsundampa in a fire dragon year of the 14th of cycle of the lunar calendar. He was recognized as Noyon Khutagt when he was one year old and enthroned at the age of fourteen in an earth dragon year (1868). During his enthronement ceremony, the Seventh Jetsundampa offered 64 families from his own disciple’s county. The Sixth Noyon Khutagt Luvsan-dondov died in a wooden pig year of the 15th cycle of the lunar calendar (1875) at age 20.

=== Agvaan-luvsan-dambee-jantsan ===
Noyon Khutagt Agvaan-luvsan-dambee-jantsan (ngag-dbang blo-zang bstan-pa’i rgyal-mtshan) was born as a son of Sharkhuu and Jinjee with clear signs of a higher being in a wooden pig year of the 15th cycle (1875). The Seventh Noyon Khutagt had established four aimags (major divisions) i.e., worship or devotion, preachers (nomch), abbots and monks. He had also established Great Jagar Choir (Buddhist philosophy) College of Tashi Goman of Tibet in a wooden horse year (1882) at Khamar Monastery. The Seventh Noyon Khutagt revised ‘The Life Story Moon Cuckoo” and staged it again in a water tiger year (1890). Noyon Khutagt Agvaan-luvsan-dambee-jantsan died on the 16th day of the last winter month, an iron sheep year of the 16th cycle of the lunar calendar (1931) at 57. Generally, it is not clear how his condition was after his arrest by Mongolian National Security and Intelligence Organization. No clear records document him at the Intelligence Archive.

=== Samdanjamts ===
Noyon Khutagt Samdanjamts (bsam gtan rgya mtsho) has no clear account, because he was not officially recognized and enthroned in Mongolia. In 1945, Soviet and Mongolian armies marched into the territory of China and freed it from Japan. After this historical event Mongolian refugees in Inner Mongolia moved back to the Mongolian People's Republic. Some monks came up with news about the Eight Noyon Khutagt together with handwritten list of names of Noyon Khutagts. Since it was a Communist regime, Gobi people could not take steps towards clarifying on this. What elders heard during their hidden meetings and conversations was: Genden, who was an attendant to the Seventh Noyon Khutagt, fled to Inner Mongolia and found the Eight Noyon Khutagt there. This was linked with Japanese policy to establish united Mongolia and Manchu state under her rule. The idea was to use the so called Noyon Khutagt as the head of Buddhism of the planned state. When Mongolians were moving back to their home country Samdanjamts was around 15 or 16 year. He decided to stay there. Thereafter, Mongolians lost any communications with him.

=== Danzanluvsantudev ===
Noyon Khutagt Danzanluvsantudev was identified by the Dalai Lama on 29 December 2012 and enthroned as the Noyon Khutagt the following March.
