= Khövsgöl =

Khövsgöl or Hovsgol may refer to several locations in Mongolia:

- Lake Khövsgöl
- Khövsgöl Province
- Khövsgöl, Dornogovi, a district
