= Khatanbulag =

District in Dornogovi Province, Mongolia

Khatanbulag Хатанбулаг сум ᠬᠠᠲᠠᠨᠪᠤᠯᠠᠭᠰᠤᠮᠤ Khatanbulag District
- District
- Location in Mongolia
- Coordinates: 43°09′12″N 109°08′31″E
- Country: Mongolia
- Province: Dornogovi Province

Area
  - Total: 18,669.37 km^{2} (7,208.28 sq mi)
- Elevation: 1,140 m (3,750 ft)
- Time zone: UTC+08:00 (ULAT)

Khatanbulag (Mongolian: Хатанбулаг = "Queen's Spring") is a sum (district) of Dornogovi Province in south-eastern Mongolia. It is the site of the restored Khamar Monastery that was built in 1820, destroyed in the Communist purges of 1937, and rebuilt after the Mongolian Revolution of 1990. According to local legend and oral history, the name is tied to a historical site where one of Genghis Khan’s queens, Börte was laid to rest or stayed during campaigns, leading to the spring being named in her honor.

== Geography ==
Khatanbulag is the largest district in Dornogovi Province. It is also the southern most district in the province.

== Administrative divisions ==
The district is divided into six bags, which are:

- Agaruut
- Aman-Us
- Ergel
- Khaliv
- Sulinkheer
- Zamiin shand
