= Batmunkh Luvsandash =

Mongolian engineer and environmental activist

- Born: 1944 (age 81–82); Khövsgöl, Dornogovi, Mongolia
- Education: Irkutsk National Research Technical University (BS)
- Occupations: environmental activist; engineer
- Awards: Goldman Prize 2025

Batmunkh Luvsandash (born 1944) is a Mongolian environmental activist and electrical engineer who has been known for his activism against mining that causes environmental activist in his home of Mongolia. He notably protected the area around Khutag Mountain. He was awarded the 2025 Goldman Environmental Prize for Asia for his environmental activism.

== Biography ==
He was born in 1944 in Khövsgöl, Dornogovi, to a family of livestock herders. After attending local schools, the year before he was to graduate high school, he competed in the Mongolian Mathematics Olympiad and was awarded the opportunity to study abroad at any country, university, or course he was interested in. He chose the Irkutsk National Research Technical University, where he studied electrical engineering.

He worked abroad in Laos to help build hospitals and in Armenia to rebuild schools after the 1988 Armenian earthquake. He returned home to Mongolia in 1991, and worked as an engineer in mines for fifteen years.

He began becoming concerned about environmental issues in 2005, retired at the age of 60, and soon became an active environmental activist focusing on blocking mines from damaging the land.

He became noted for traveling around to survey the area and for spending a lot of time studying the relevant laws, soon protecting more than 20 areas in his province. He also became known for his incredibly accurate, hand-drawn maps, which matched almost exactly to maps created through drone and satellite photo use by The Nature Conservancy.

The achievement he is most known for is protecting Khutag Mountain in Khutag-Öndör due to its sacred status. He has created zones that protect Arabi sheep, Asiatic wild ass, and a rich variety of plants, among other things.

He was nominated for the Goldman by The Nature Conservancy, and was ultimately awarded the 2025 Goldman Environmental Prize for Asia. He was the subject of a short film called Pride of the Gobi in 2025. He was also named to the Asian Science 100.
