= Irkutsk National Research Technical University =

Technical university in Russia

- Иркутский национальный исследовательский технический университет
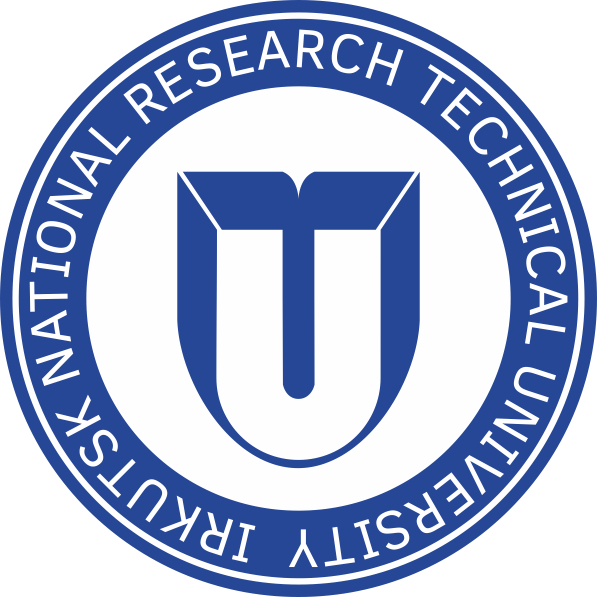
- Motto: Знания - для себя, достижения - для Отечества
- Motto in English: Knowledge for yourself, achievements for homeland
- Type: Public
- Established: 1 January 1930; 96 years ago
- Rector: Kornyakov Michael Victorovich
- Academic staff: 980
- Students: 18451
- Undergraduates: 10000
- Postgraduates: 3000
- Doctoral students: 500
- Location: Irkutsk, Russia; 52°15′46″N 104°15′43″E
- Campus: Urban
- Language: Russian
- Nickname: INRTU
- Website: eng.istu.edu

University rankings

Global – Overall
- THE World: 1201–1500 (2022)

Regional – Overall
- QS Emerging Europe and Central Asia: 301-350 (2022)

National – Overall
- Forbes National: 57 (2022)
- Interfax National: 47 (2022)

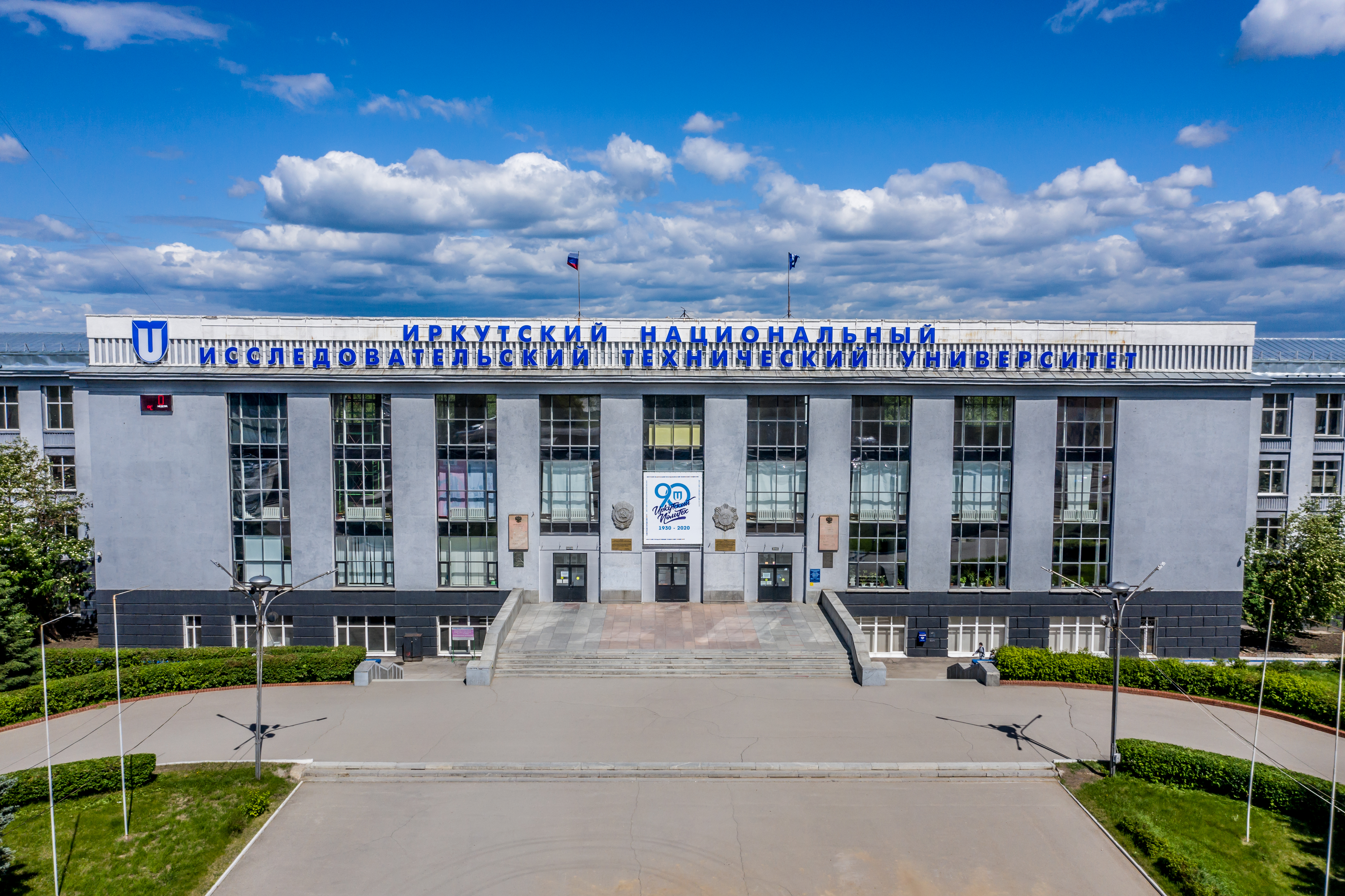
Irkutsk National Research Technical University main building

National Research Irkutsk State Technical University (full name in Russian: Иркутский национальный исследовательский технический университет), formerly Irkutsk State Technical University, is a technical university in Russia.

== History ==
The Specialized Secondary School Irkutsk Mining College was established in 1893, with the principal objective to train mill-diggers for the needs of mining business, and in particular the gold-mining industry.

In 1918 the school was transformed into a Secondary Mining College, and in 1920 it was renamed the Irkutsk Polytechnic College. But the technical school was soon reorganised into the Irkutsk Polytechnic Practical Institute (IrPolPrIn). In August 1923 Irpolprin was reorganized into East Siberian Polytechnic College of regional importance, and later formed the foundation of the Siberian Mining Institute in Irkutsk. The Mining Institute was housed at 3, Lenin Street. S.V. Sergeev, head of the Geological Survey Department of the Soyuzdoloto Board was appointed as its first director; Professor G.V. Kliuchanskiy was appointed as his deputy for educational and scientific work.

Around that time, the Faculty of Workers (rabfak) was opened.

On March 19, 1960, the Mining and Metallurgical Institute was renamed to Polytechnic Institute. It received its designation as a university in 1994 and received its Certificate of Attestation of Educational Institution in 1997 and state accreditation in 1998.

Its scientists made a significant contribution to the economy of the Irkutsk region, East Siberian region, the CIS countries.

On 20 May 2010, IrSTU was named a "National Research University" and approved the program of scientific development in these areas:

- Highly efficient subsoil technologies
- Science-intensive, high-efficiency machinery and equipment manufacturing technologies
- Science intensive life support systems for urban and sparsely populated areas
- Industry of nanosystems and nanomaterials

== INRTU structure ==
=== Schools ===
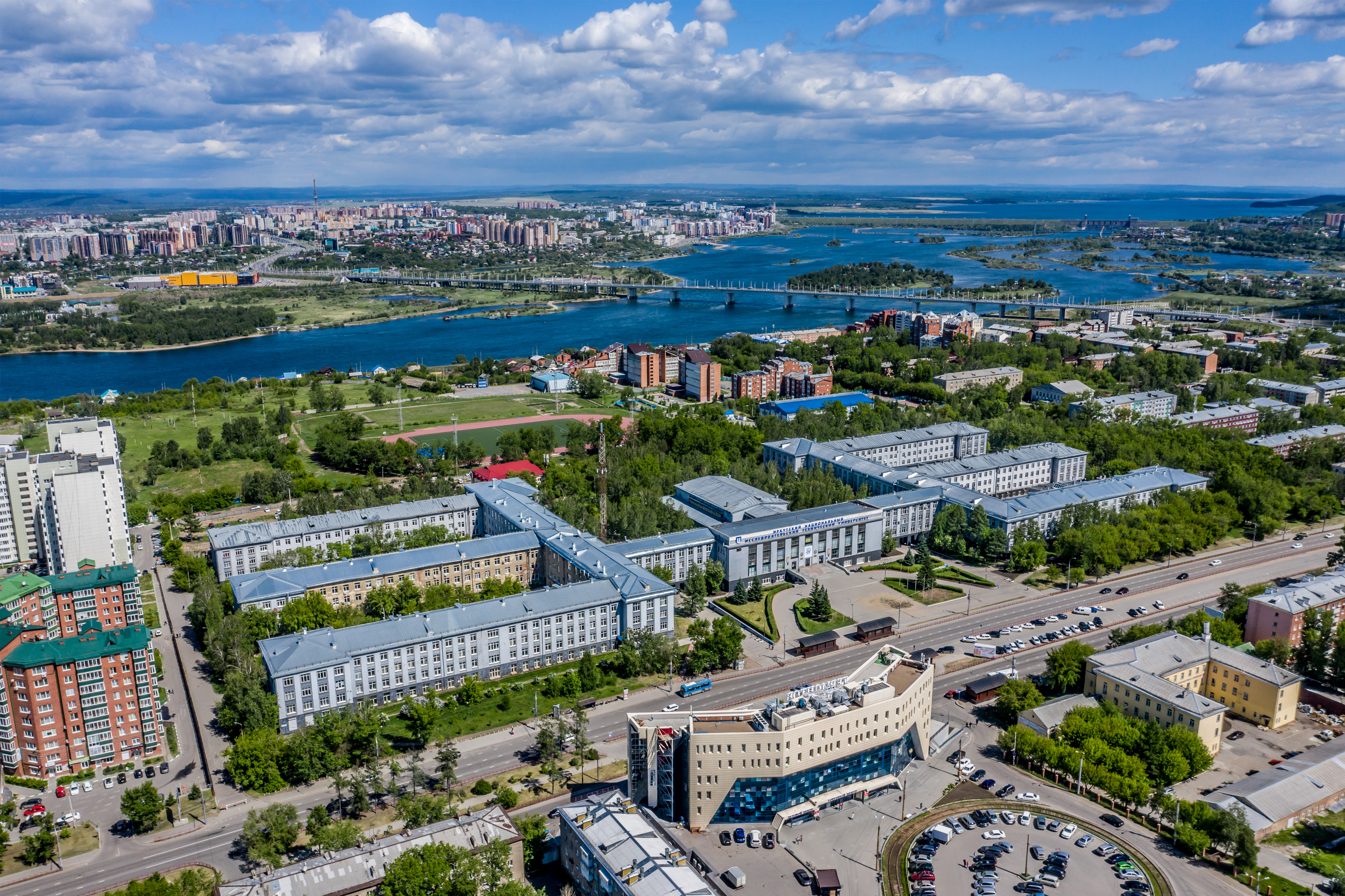
Main building from the above

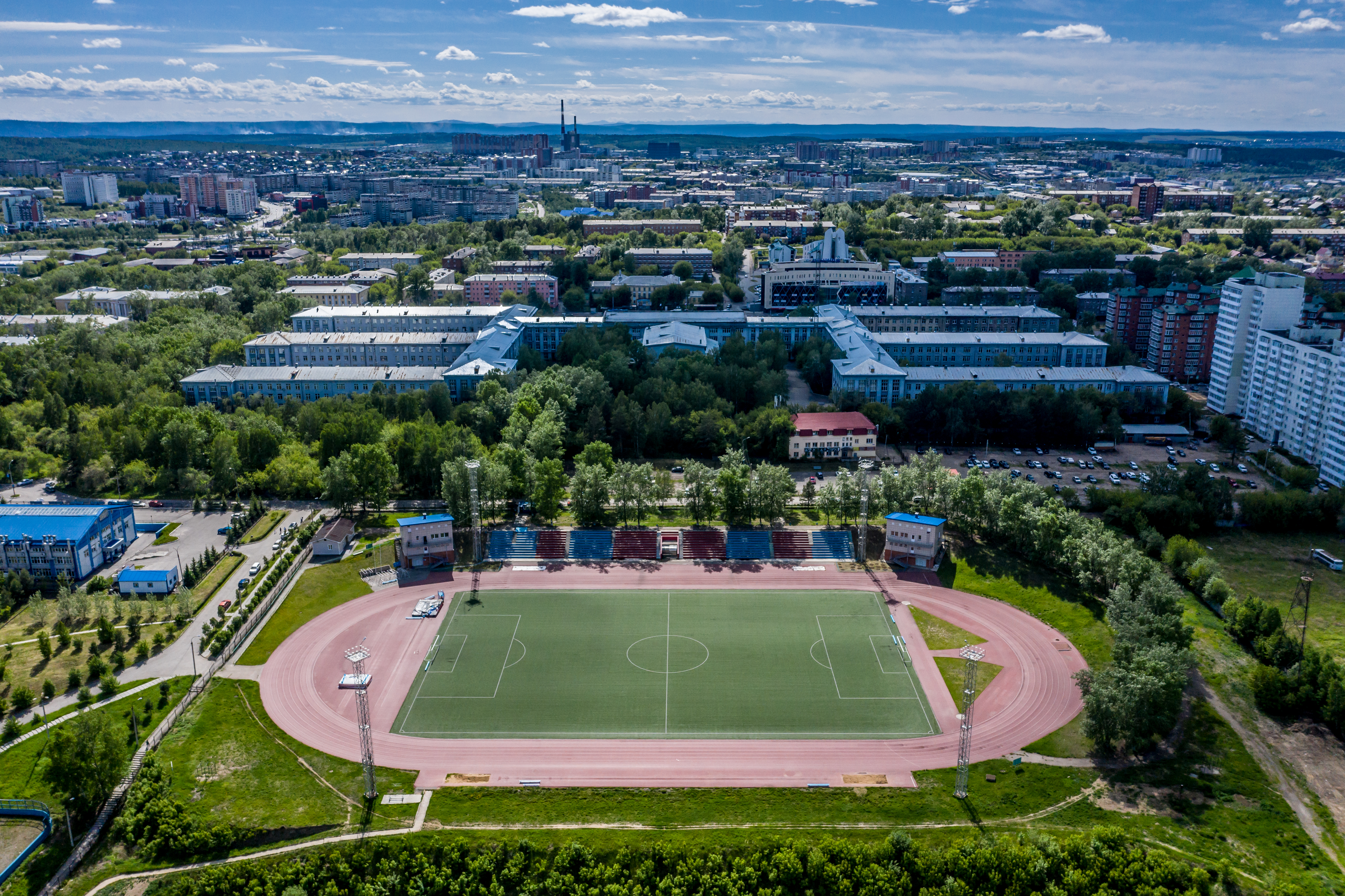
Stadium

- Siberian School of Geosciences
- Baikal School of BRICS
- School of Aircraft Construction, Mechanical Engineering and Transport
- School of Architecture, Construction and Design
- School of High Technologies
- School of Extramural and Evening Education
- School of Information Technology and Data Science
- School of Quantum Physics
- School of Linguistics and Intercultural Communication
- School of Subsurface Resource Management
- School of Economics, Management and Law
- School of Power Engineering

=== Divisions ===
- Branch School in Usolye-Sibirskoye
- Department of Secondary Vocational Education:
- College of Mechanical Engineering
- Geological Exploration Technical School
- Department of Educational and Production Work
- Professional Internship facilities in Slyudyanka

=== Scientific and educational centers and institutions within the university ===
- INRTU Center for Fundamental Research
- Baikal Nanotechnology Center
- Science Library
- Museum of INRTU history
- The Museum of Mineralogy is the largest mineralogical museum beyond the Urals
- Museum of Military Glory
- Museum of the History of Computing

== INRTU Academic Programs ==
Today the university trains specialists in the fields of oil and energy industry, mechatronics and robotics, geoinformatics and geophysics, aircraft construction, mechanical engineering and transportation, design, architecture, civil engineering, IT technologies, environmental engineering, international business and other spheres.

INRTU offers programs of different levels of training:

- Secondary vocational education (college)
- Bachelor's degree (4-5.5 years)
- Master's degree (2 years)
- Postgraduate studies (3-4 years)

INRTU's main areas of study

- Architecture
- Civil Engineering
- Design
- Monumental and Decorative Arts
- Mechanical Engineering
- Aircraft Engineering
- Mechatronics & Robotics
- Heat Power Engineering and Electric Power Engineering
- Chemical Engineering
- Metallurgy
- Innovation Studies
- Biotechnology
- Computer Science
- Oil and Gas Engineering
- Mining
- Applied Geology & Geodesy
- Economics
- Management
- Journalism
- Linguistics

For international students, INRTU offers Foundation programs that help them improve their Russian language skills and prepare to study in Russian-taught programs at any university in Russia:

- Advanced Course
- Preparatory Course (15-month Russian language course)

INRTU English-Taught Programs

Bachelor's degree:

- Artificial Intelligence and Computer Science
- Environmental Science Engineering
- Finance and Accounting
- Sustainable Innovative Economics
- Power Electrical Engineering
- Mechanical Engineering
- International Business
- Journalism and Media Communication
- Linguistics and Business Communications

Master's degree:

- Big Data Analytics and Artificial Intelligence
- MBA: Global Management and Leadership
- Renewable Energy
- Ecology & Green Technologies

== Campus and Accommodation ==
INRTU campus is one of the biggest among universities in Irkutsk, occupying an area of 480 000 square meters. It takes about 15 minutes to get to the city historical and business center, 10 minutes to the railway station and 30 minutes to the airport by public transportation (bus, tram, trolleybus).

INRTU campus includes academic buildings, student dormitories and hostels, canteens and shops, student clinic and sanatorium, stadiums and other sports facilities, banks and post office conveniently located. The campus has its own security service.

All international students are provided with accommodation. INRTU has 19 dormitories for students from different cities and international students, priced between 900 and 9 500 RUB per month.

Computer class for studying, meeting room, canteens and recreation zones

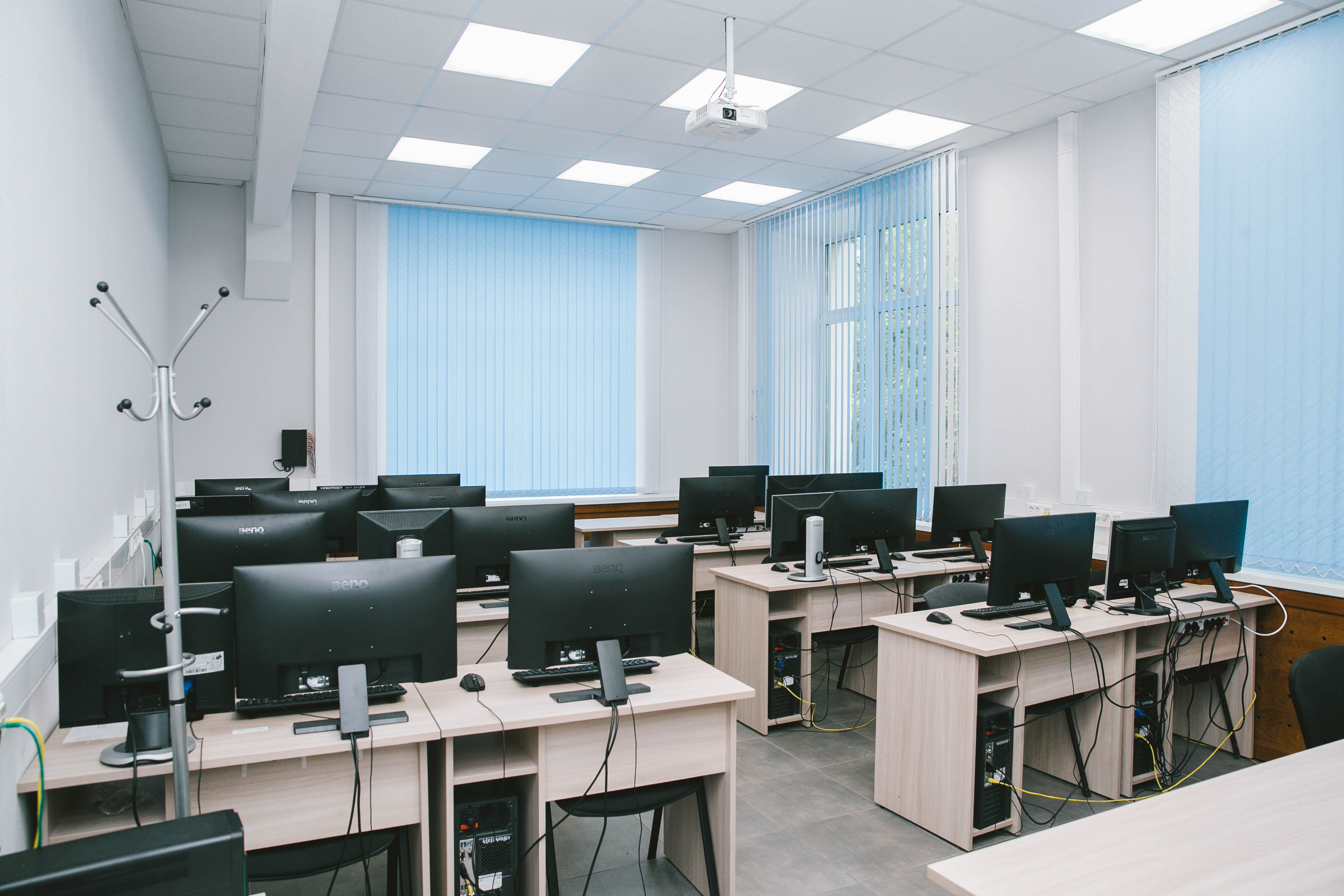

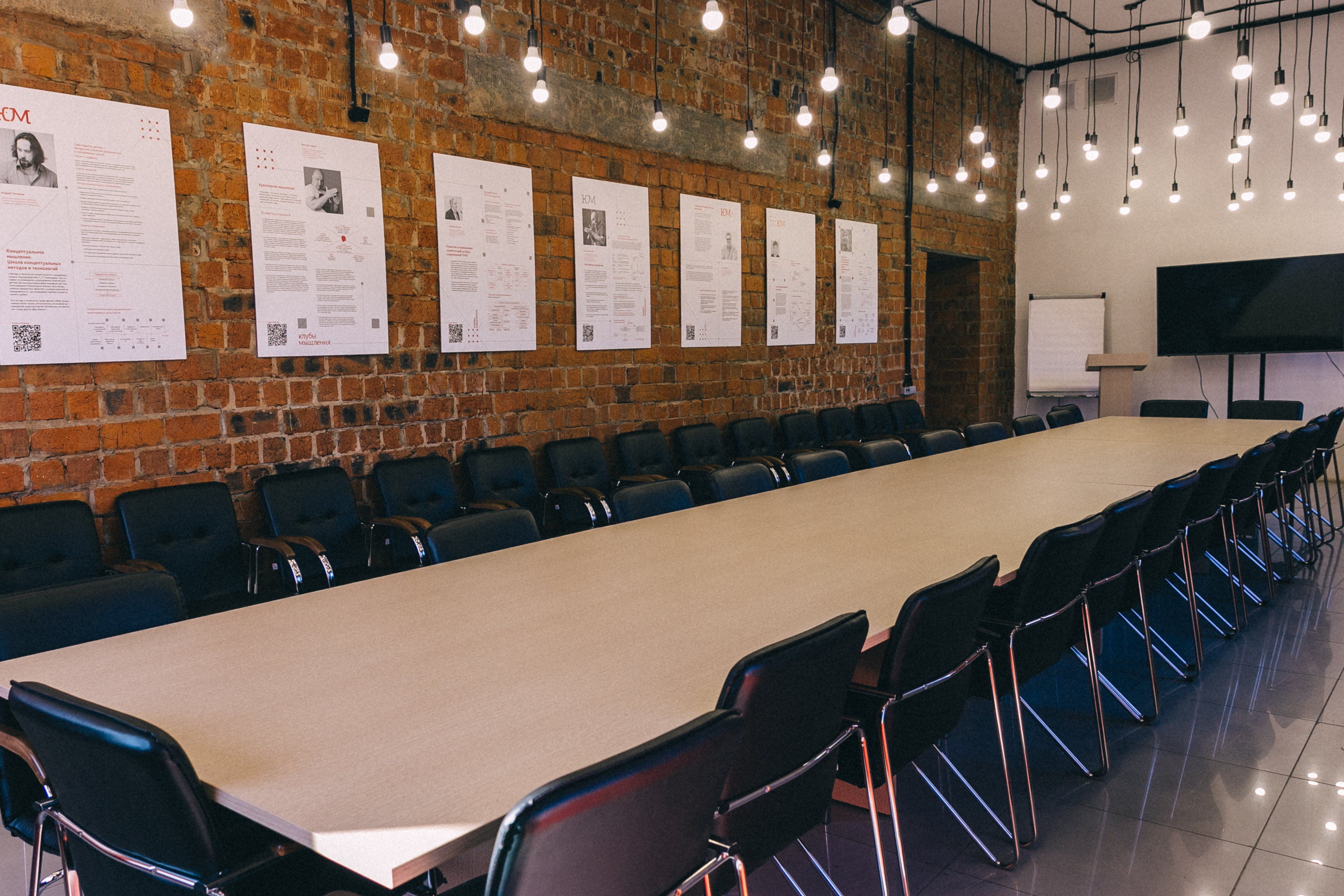

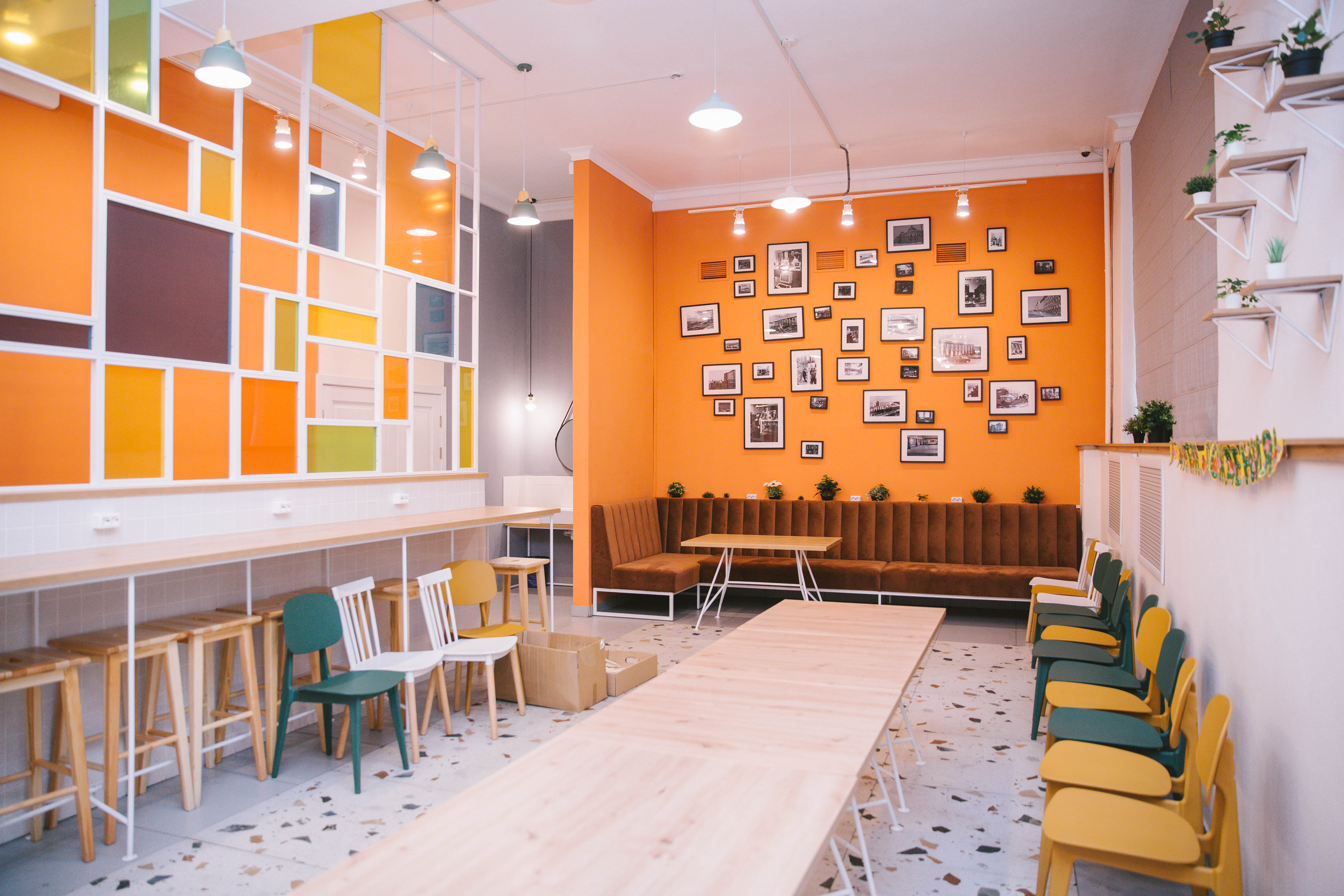

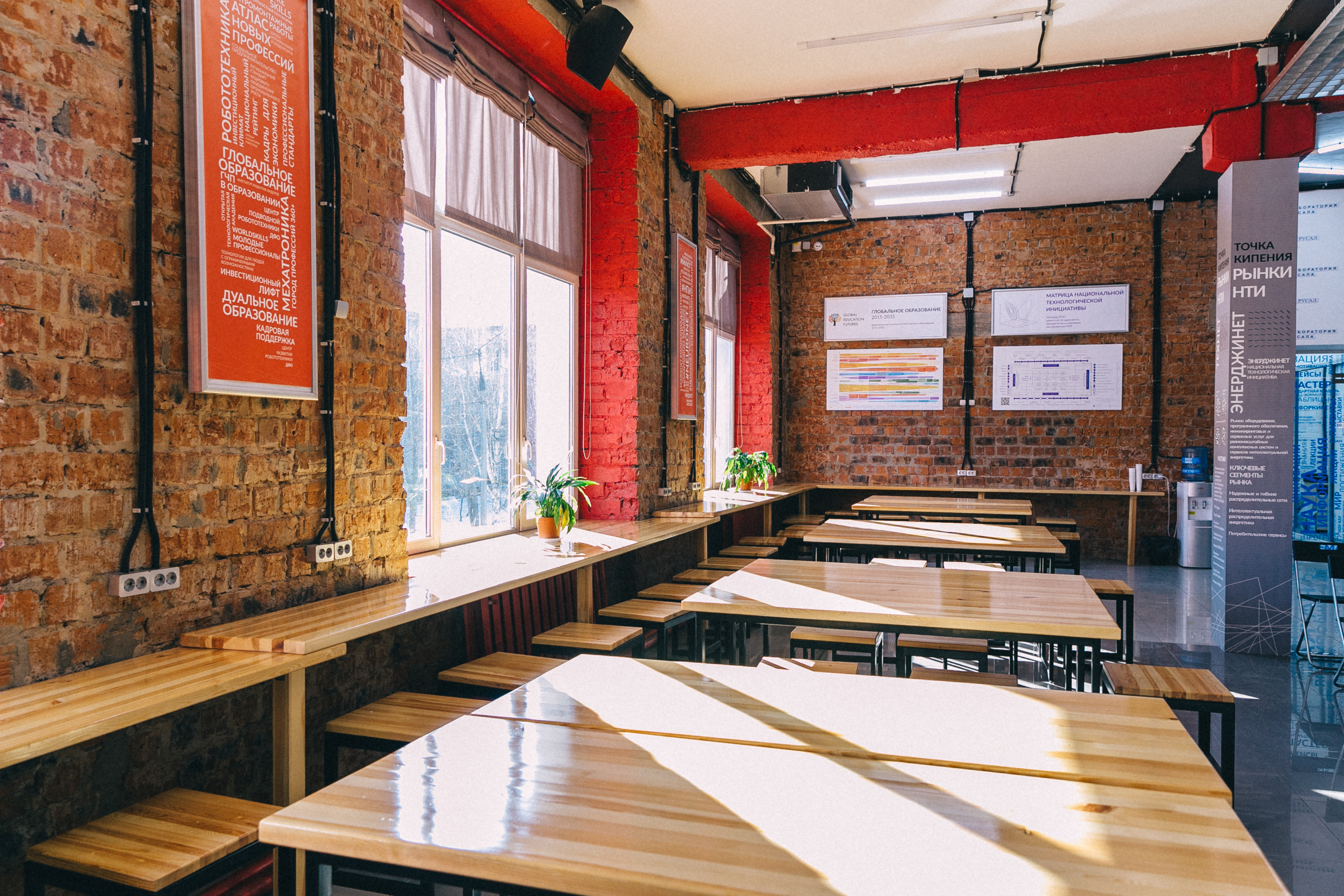

== International rankings ==
=== 2022 ===
- 1201-1500 Times Higher Education (World University Rankings 2023)
- 301-400 Times Higher Education (University Impact Ranking)
- 1001+ Times Higher Education (by subject: engineering)
- 301-350 QS (Emerging Europe and Central Asia Rating)
- 351-400 QS (BRICS University Rankings)
- 204 – UI Green Metrics (World University Ranking)
- 57 – Forbes Top 100 Russian university
- 47 – Interfax national ranking

=== 2021 ===
- 301-350 QS (Emerging Europe and Central Asia Rating)
- 351-400 QS (BRICS University Rankings)
- 401-600 Times Higher Education (University Impact Ranking)
- 225 – UI Green Metrics (World University Ranking)
- 63 – Forbes Top 100 Russian university
- 32 – Interfax national ranking

=== 2020 ===
- 251-300 QS (Emerging Europe and Central Asia Rating)
- 351-400 QS (BRICS University Rankings)
- 601+ Times Higher Education (University Impact Ranking)
- 389 – UI Green Metrics (World University Ranking)
- 77 – Forbes Top 100 Russian university
- 29 – Interfax national ranking

=== 2019 ===
- 351-400 QS (BRICS University Rankings)
- 301+ Times Higher Education (University Impact Ranking)
- 540 – UI Green Metrics (World University Ranking)
- 34 – Interfax national ranking

== Priority 2030 ==
In 2022, INRTU was one of 106 Russian universities who participated in the Strategic Academic Leadership Program.

INRTU is implementing two strategic projects within this Program - i.GeoDesign and Digital Industrial Technologies.

i.GeoDesign aims to change the principles of mining and geological industry formation through the university developments in smart digital geology, usage of drones in exploration, and the university new role in shaping junior business. The second project of Digital Industrial Technologies is associated with the development of advanced manufacturing technologies and raising high-skilled specialists for the Russian industry in the fields of aircraft, energy and construction.

== Innovation ==
Irkutsk National Research Technical University is the leader of the Irkutsk region in innovation sphere. In 2017, the university received the status of a Regional Center of Technological Development. Every year INRTU generates more than 60 innovative projects.

The INRTU Technopark was opened in 2010. It became the first scientific and technological complex in Irkutsk region. The total area of the INRTU Technopark is 5260 sq. m. It includes research laboratories, modern teaching, production and corporate research centers, a business incubator, and a large conference room. The INRTU Technopark residents are 41 high-tech companies, which in 2020 carried out assignments for more than 800 million rubles. Various innovative infrastructure projects are successfully implemented at INRTU Technopark: student business accelerator, startup school for innovators "Taiga", startup school "Taiga. Junior", Irkutsk school of innovation managers and others.

== International Partnerships ==
INRTU productively cooperates with 111 partners from 25 countries in Europe and Asia; has 138 agreements on cooperation, including 9 double degree programs with partner universities.

Double degree and exchange programs are implemented in cooperation with more than 20 countries among which are Mongolia, China, Kazakhstan, Belarus, Republic of Korea and many others.

INRTU is a member of several international organizations:

- Association of Sino-Russian Technical Universities
- Romualdo del Bianco Foundation
- SUN – Silkroad University Network

== Notable graduates ==
- Batmunkh Luvsandash, Mongolian environmental activist and engineer
