= Ulemjiin Chanar =

Song
- Language: Mongolian
- Genre: Folklore
- Composer: Danzanravjaa

Ulemjiin Chanar (in Mongolian: Үлэмжийн чанар, meaning "quality of greatness") is a Mongolian folk song composed by Danzanravjaa at his meditation center in the Gobi Desert. The song praises the beauty of a woman and is one of the most well known and popular folk songs in Mongolia. Because of its spiritual qualities, singing the song with all one's heart is believed to produce merit equivalent to reciting ten thousand Tara Ekh tantric prayers. Renowned Mongolian singer Norovbanzad's rendering of the song is well known, among many other modern interpretations. The song has been made into a theater drama play and drama movie a number of times throughout the 20th century as well as a musical in 2008.

== Original lyrics by Danzanravjaa ==
Үлэмжийн чанар төгөлдөр
Өнгө тунамал толь шиг
Үзэсгэлэнт царайг чинь
Үзвэл лагшин төгс маань
Үнэхээр сэтгэлийг булаанам зээ

Хөшүүн сэтгэлийг уяруулагч
Хөхөө шувууны эгшиг шиг
Хөөрхөн эелдэг үг чинь
Хүүрнэн суухад урамтай
Хөөрхөн ааль мину зээ

Учирмагц сэнгэнэсэн
Уран гол шиг бие чинь
Угаас хамт бүтсэн
Улаан занданы үнэр шиг
Улмаар сэтгэлийг хөдөлгөнө зээ

Бадмын дундаас дэвэрсэн
Балын амт адил
Баясгалант ааль чинь
Бахдаж ханашгүй
Баярыг улам арвитгана зээ

Хүний энэ насанд
Хүссэн хэргээ бүтээгээд
Хүсэлт тэнгэрийн эдлэл мэт
Хөлгүй жаргалангийн далайд
Хөвж хамт жаргая
