= Khamar Monastery =

Buddhist monastery in Sainshand, Dornogovi, Mongolia

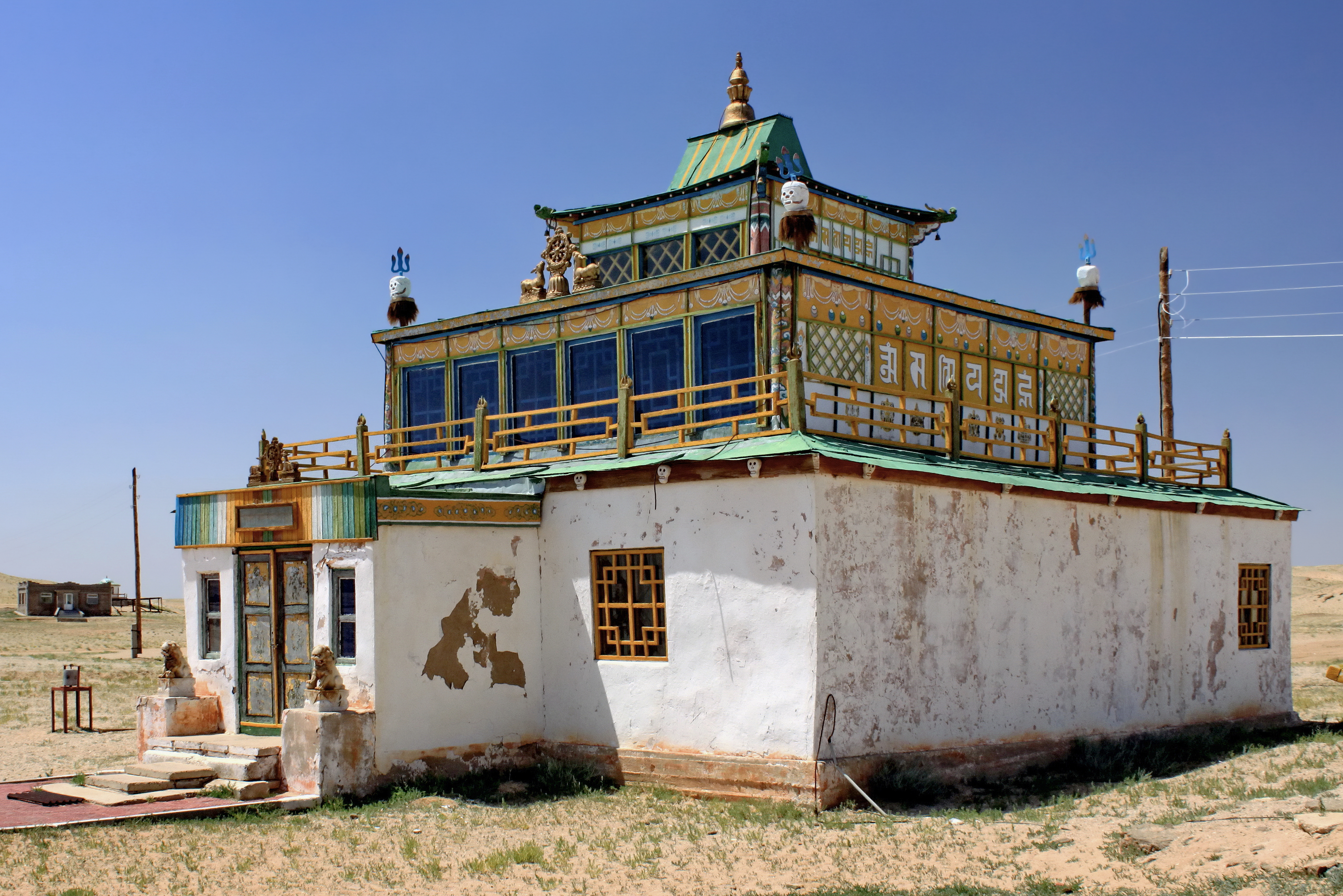

- Location within Mongolia

Religion
- Affiliation: Tibetan Buddhism
- Sect: Red Hat sect

Location
- Location: Sainshand, Dornogovi, Mongolia
- Country: Mongolia
- Coordinates: 44°35′49.98″N 110°16′24.53″E

Architecture
- Style: Chinese, Mongol and Tibetan influences
- Founder: Danzanravjaa
- Established: 1820

Khamar Monastery (Mongolian: Хамарын хийд, romanized: Khamar khiid) is a Tibetan Buddhist monastery belonging to the Red Hat sect, located in Sainshand, Dornogovi Province, Mongolia. Founded in 1820, the Khamar Monastery was an important Red Hat sect Buddhist monastic, cultural, and education center in Mongolia's Gobi Desert region until its destruction in 1937. It was rebuilt in 1990. At its height, the monastery reportedly accommodated over 80 temples and some 500 monks.

== History ==
Khamar Monastery was founded in 1821 by Dulduityn Danzanravjaa, a charismatic 17-year-old monk of the Nyingma red hat school of Buddhism. Danzanravjaa chose the site of the monastery believing the surrounding area radiated with a spiritual energy fostered by the Gobi desert. To the north of the monastery lie a series of caves where monks would retreat and practice high levels of meditation for 108 continuous days (108 being a sacred number in Buddhism).

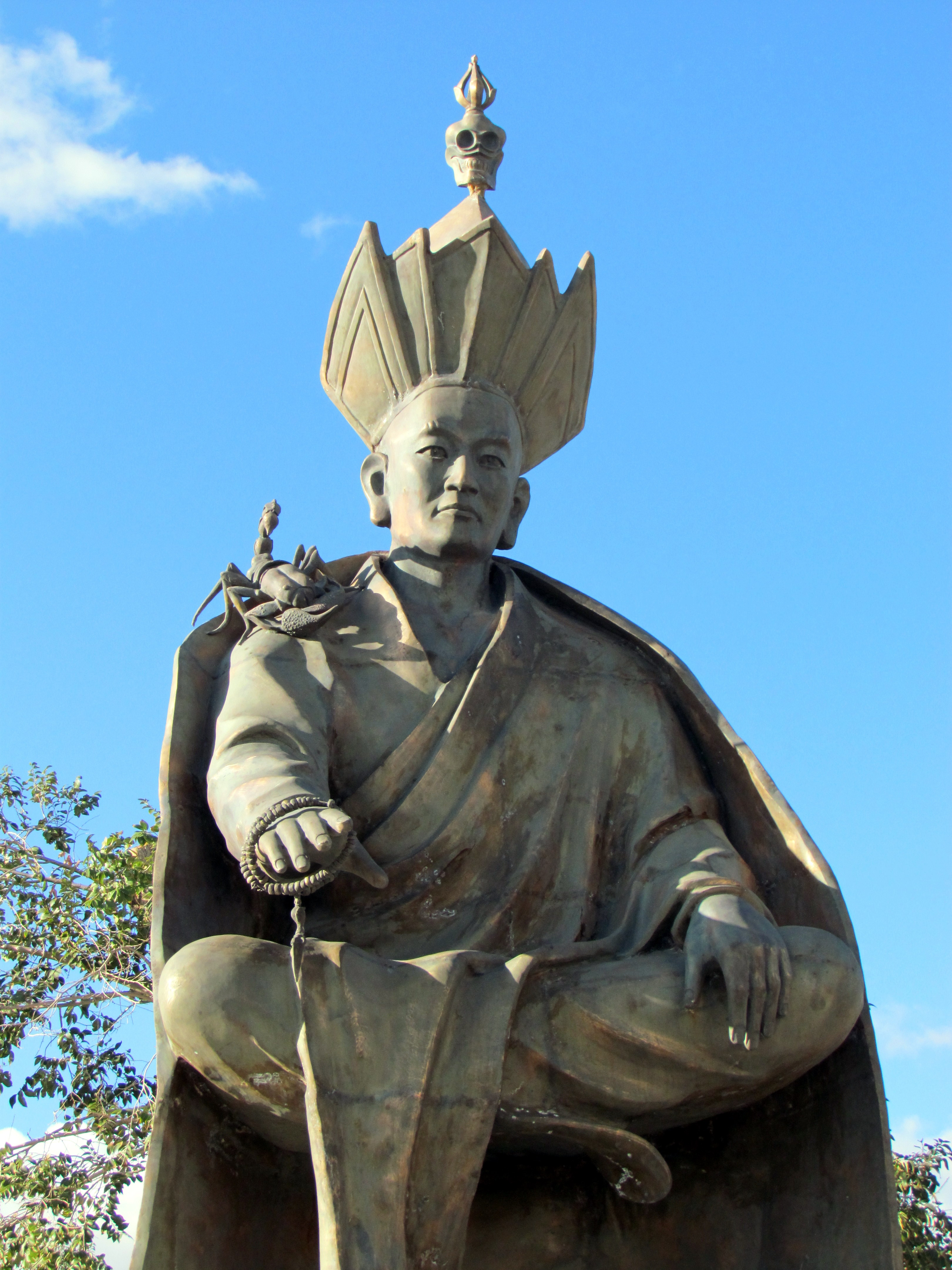
Statue of Danzanravjaa

Often referred to as "the Terrible Noble Saint of the Gobi", Danzanravjaa was an educator, poet, and harsh critic of Mongolian society. He supported the idea of public education and respect for women and he founded the monastery in the desert to serve as a model of a more enlightened society. The monastery was deeply engaged with the surrounding community and contained a public library, a museum, and a poetry recital hall. It was also home to Mongolia's first ever professional public theater, the Namtar Duulakh Datsan ("story singing college") which sponsored a touring company of some 300 artists that performed throughout the Gobi region. By the 1830s the Khamar Monastery included a school for children, the Khuukhdiin Datsan that provided a non-religious education in Mongolian and Tibetan literature, mathematics, natural science, and history.

In 1937 the monastery's lamas were driven from the grounds and the complex completely burned to the ground as part of Khorloogiin Choibalsan's Stalinist purges. Many of the lamas were executed while others were forcibly laicized.

The current monastery was built after the 1990 Democratic Revolution in Mongolia and restoration efforts continue.

== Gallery ==
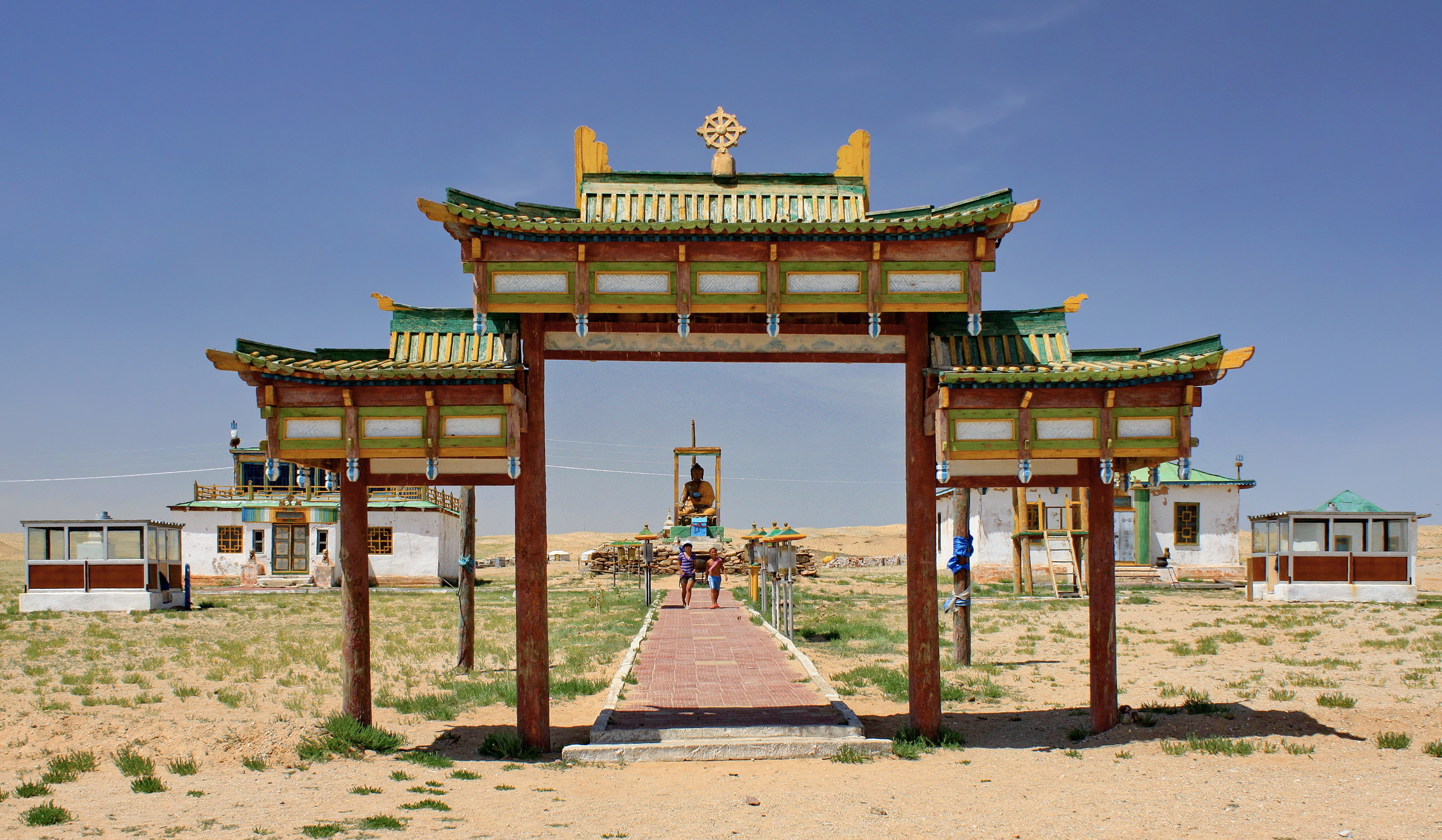
The entrance gate

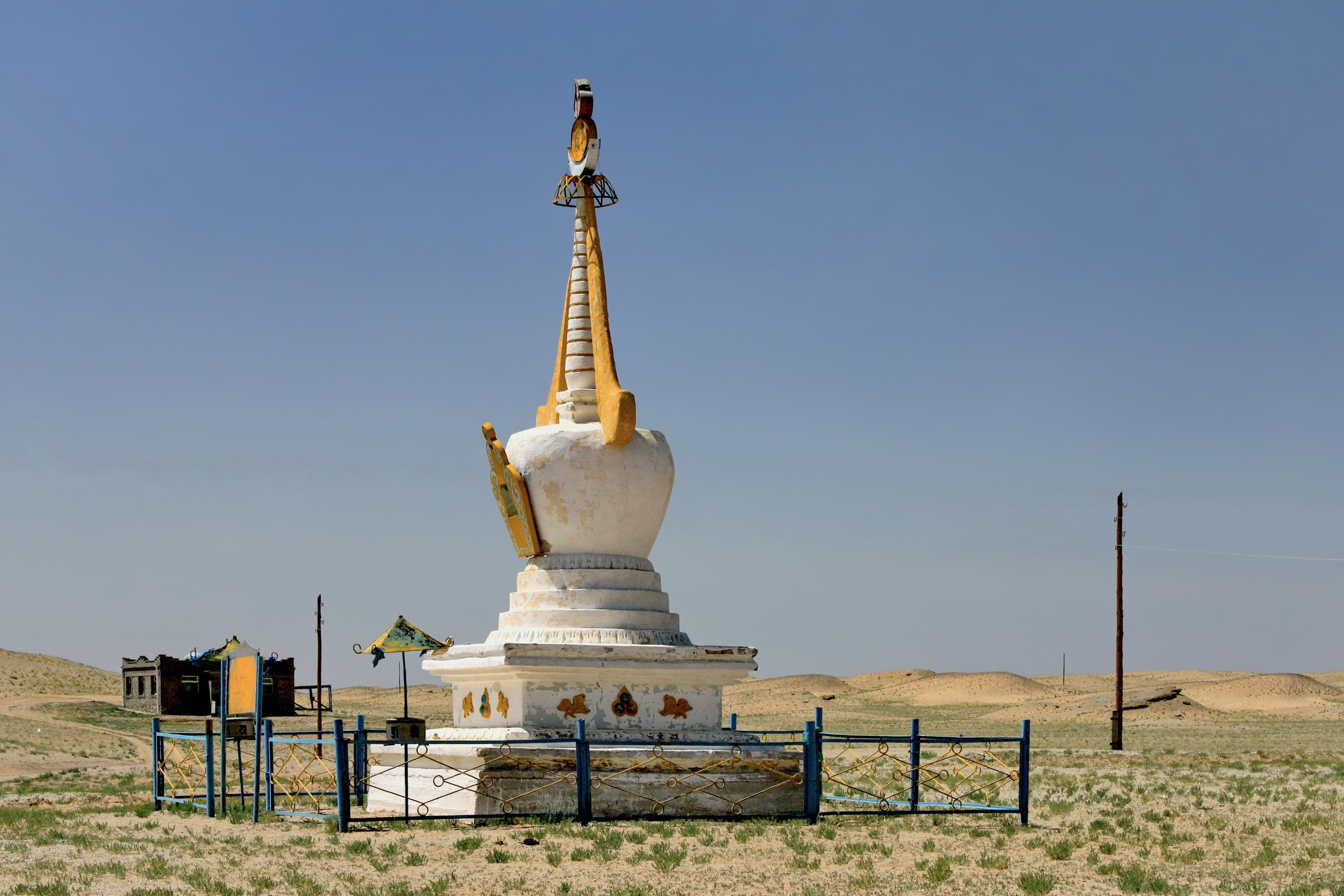
The main stupa

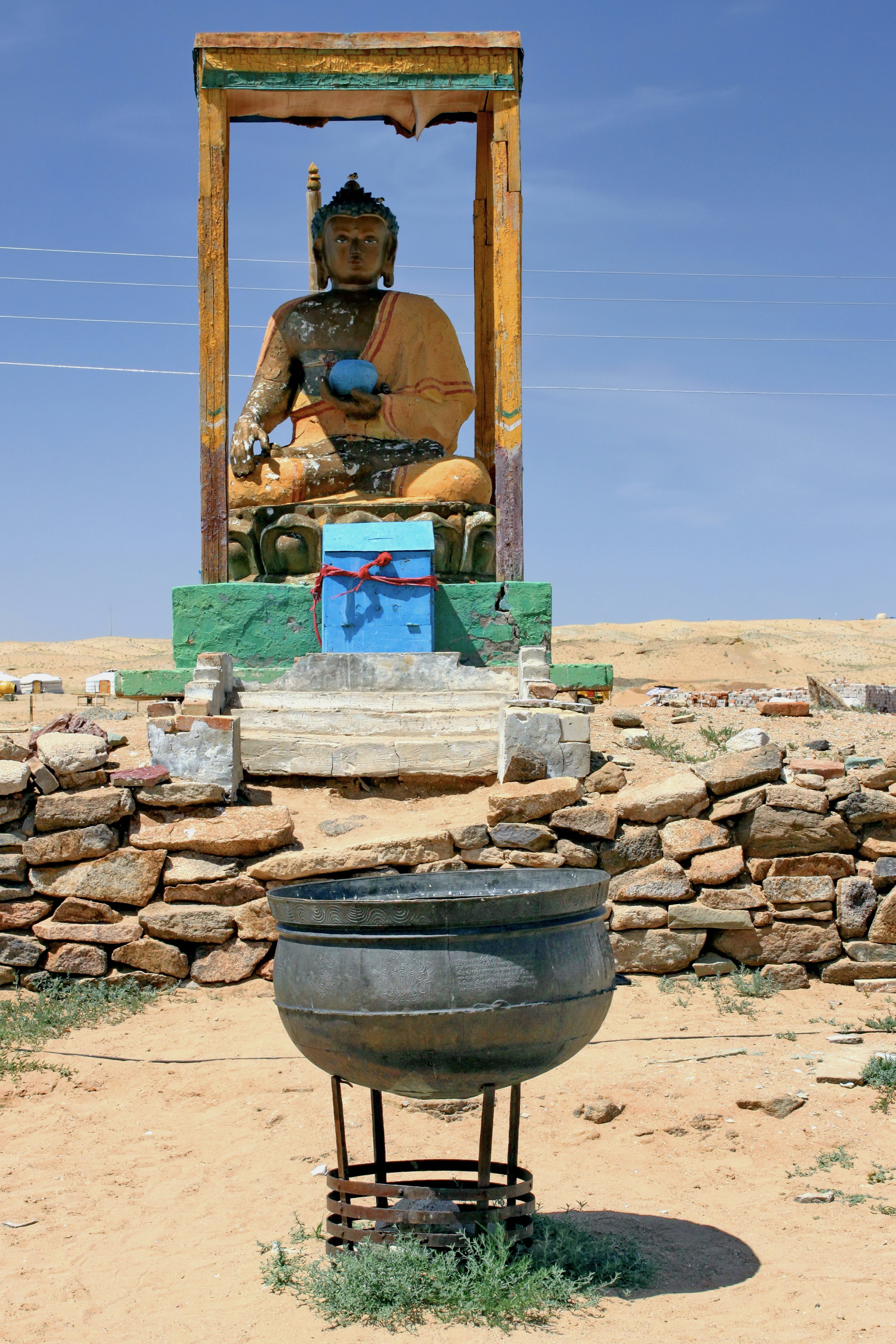
Statue of Buddha

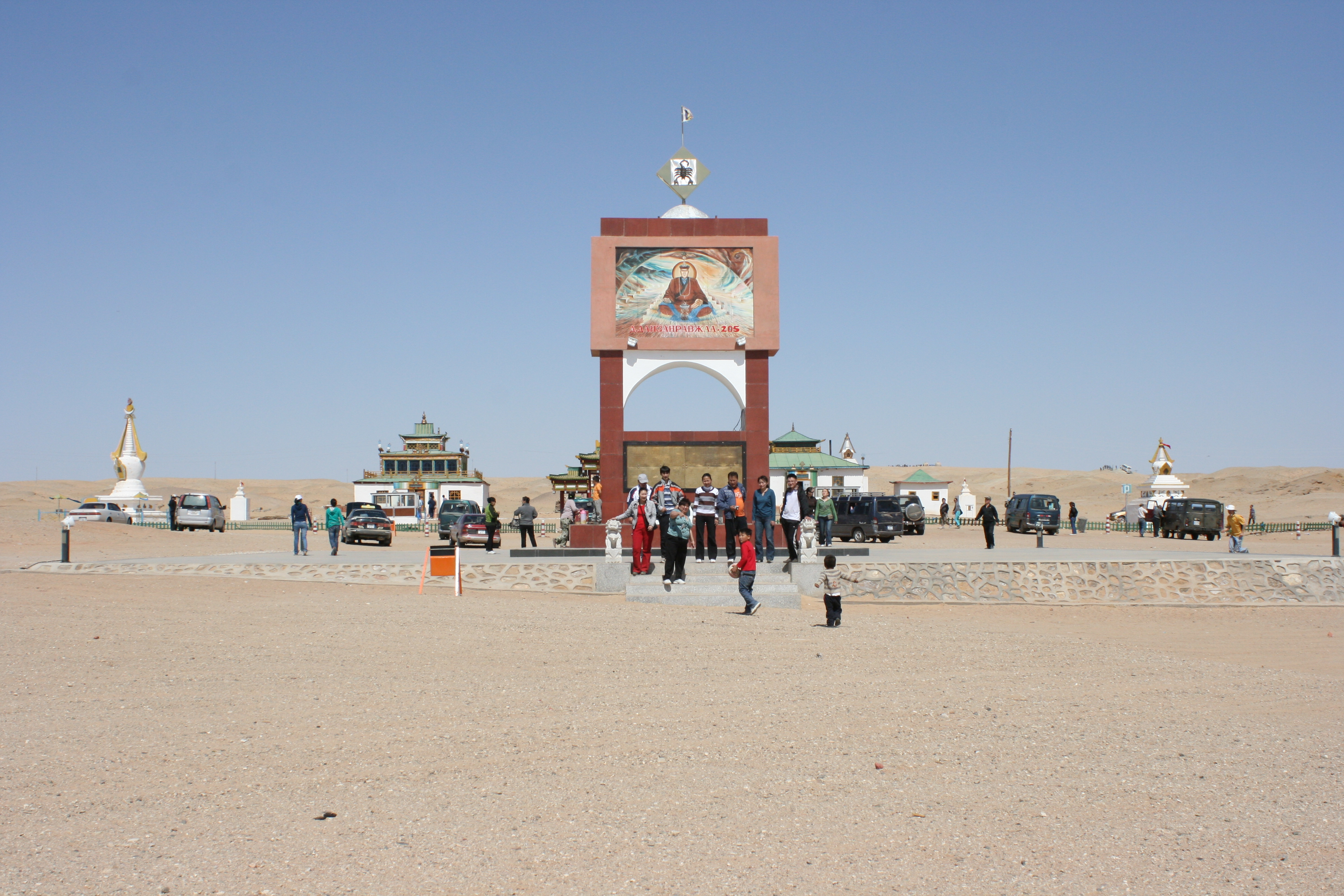
The monastery

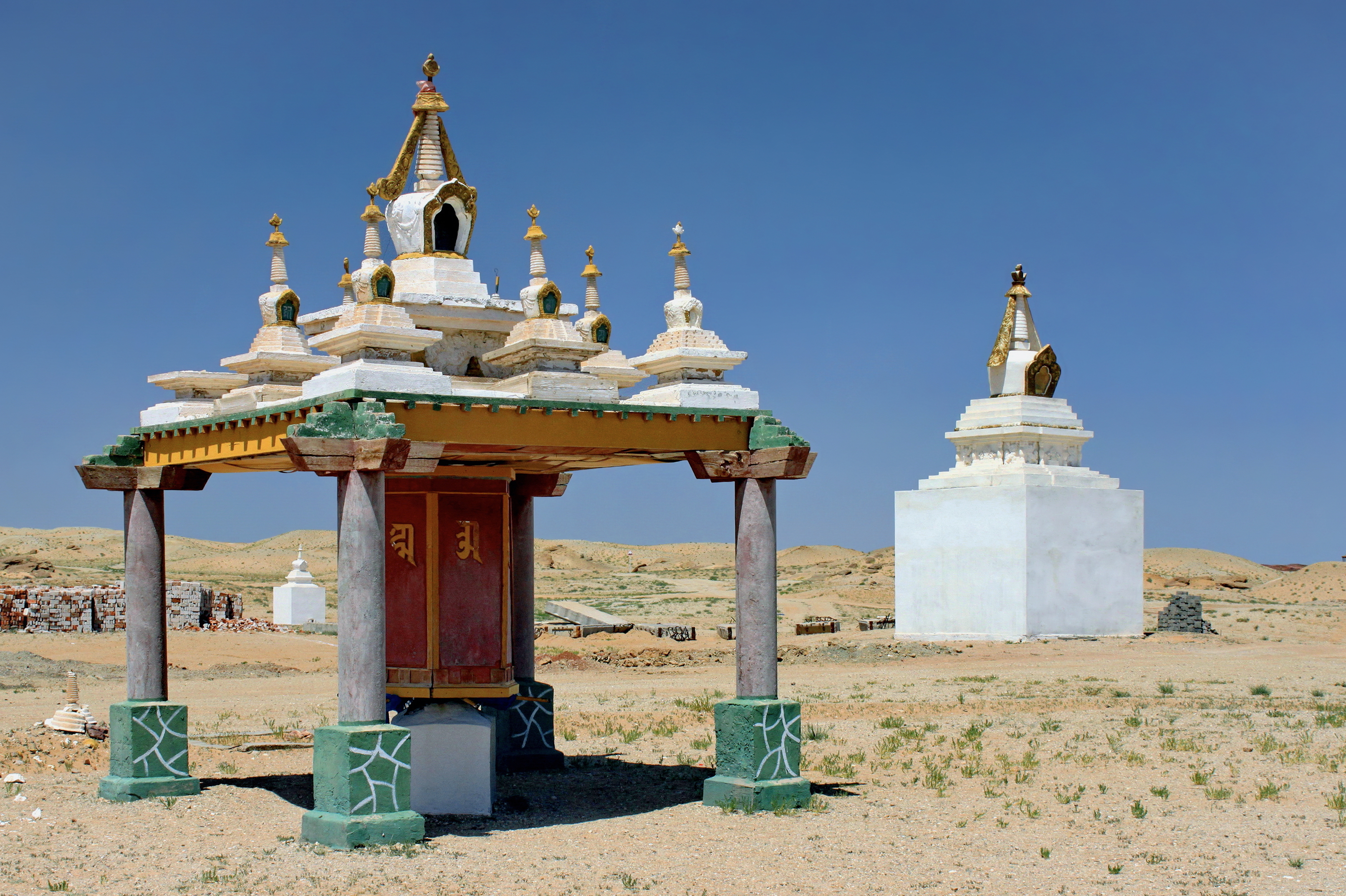
Prayer wheel and stupas
