= Red Hat sect =

School of Tibetan Buddhism

Red Hat sects is the English language translation of the Tibetic languages term shamar (uchen Tibetan script: ཞྭ་དམར)—"red hat" or "red hats"—collectively denoting the three oldest of the four primary sects of Tibetan Buddhism. These sects are termed "Red Hat" for the colour of their monks' hats as worn during formal occasions. The Red Hat sects are the Nyingma, Sakya and Kagyu schools of Tibetan Buddhism.

The fourth school is Gelug and is known as the Yellow Hat sect.

A minority considers the eldest school, the Nyingma school, to be the sole Red Hat sect.
