= Khövsgöl, Dornogovi =

District in Dornogovi Province, Mongolia

Coordinates: 43°36′30″N 109°38′33″E

Khövsgöl District Хөвсгөл сум ᠬᠥᠪᠰᠦᠭᠦᠯᠰᠤᠮᠤ
- District
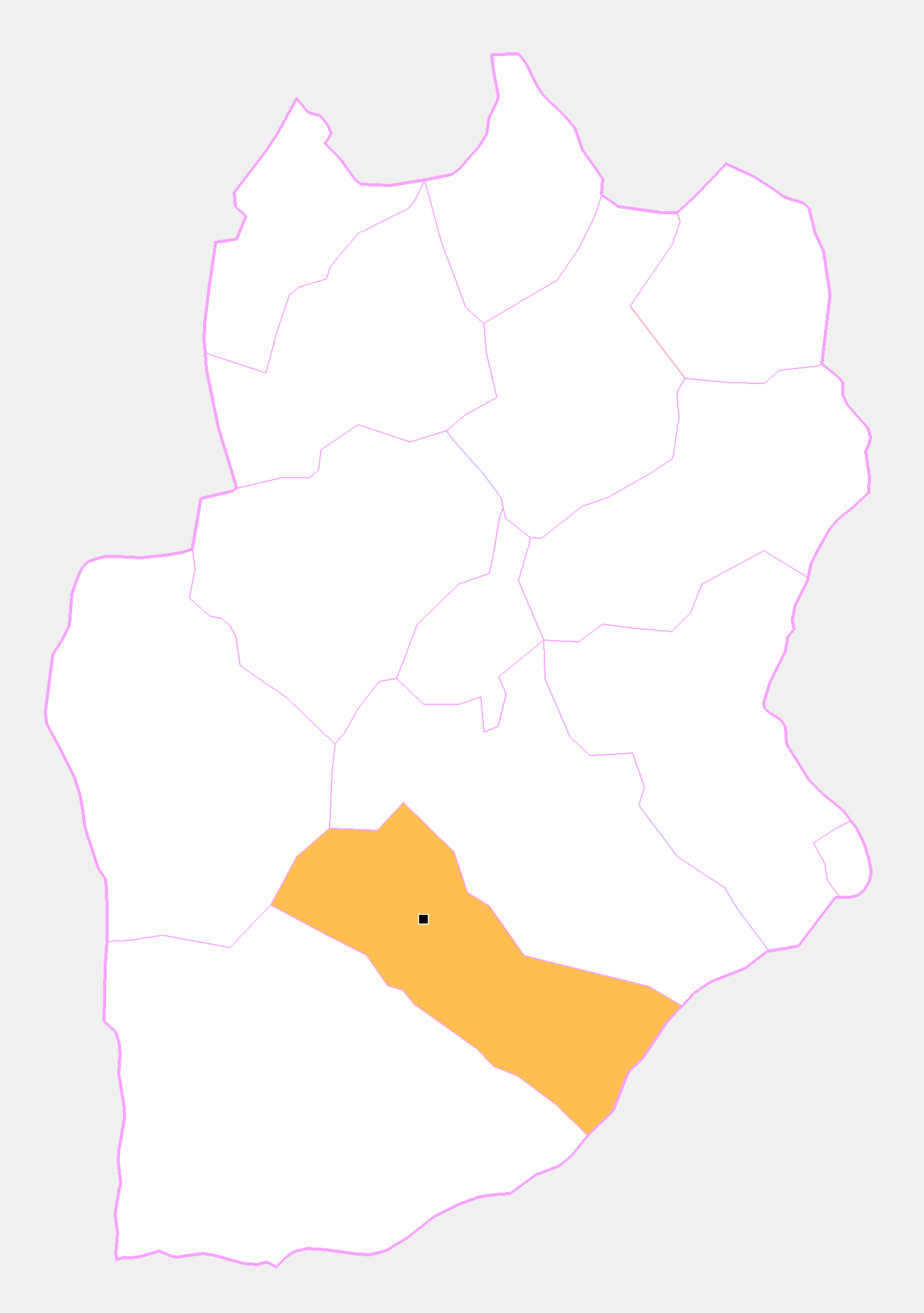
- Khövsgöl District in Dornogovi Province
- Country: Mongolia
- Province: Dornogovi Province

Area
  - Total: 8,376.96 km^{2} (3,234.36 sq mi)
- Time zone: UTC+8 (UTC + 8)

Khövsgöl (Mongolian: Хөвсгөл) is a sum (district) of Dornogovi Province in south-eastern Mongolia. It is named for Gurvan Khuvsgul Mountain. In 2009, its population was 1,531.

== Administrative divisions ==
The district is divided into four bags, which are:

- Chuluut
- Elst
- Javkhlant
- Khuvsgul

== Notable residents ==
- Batmunkh Luvsandash, Goldman Environmental Prize recipient
