= Hohhot–Ulaanbaatar through train =

Railway service in China and Mongolia

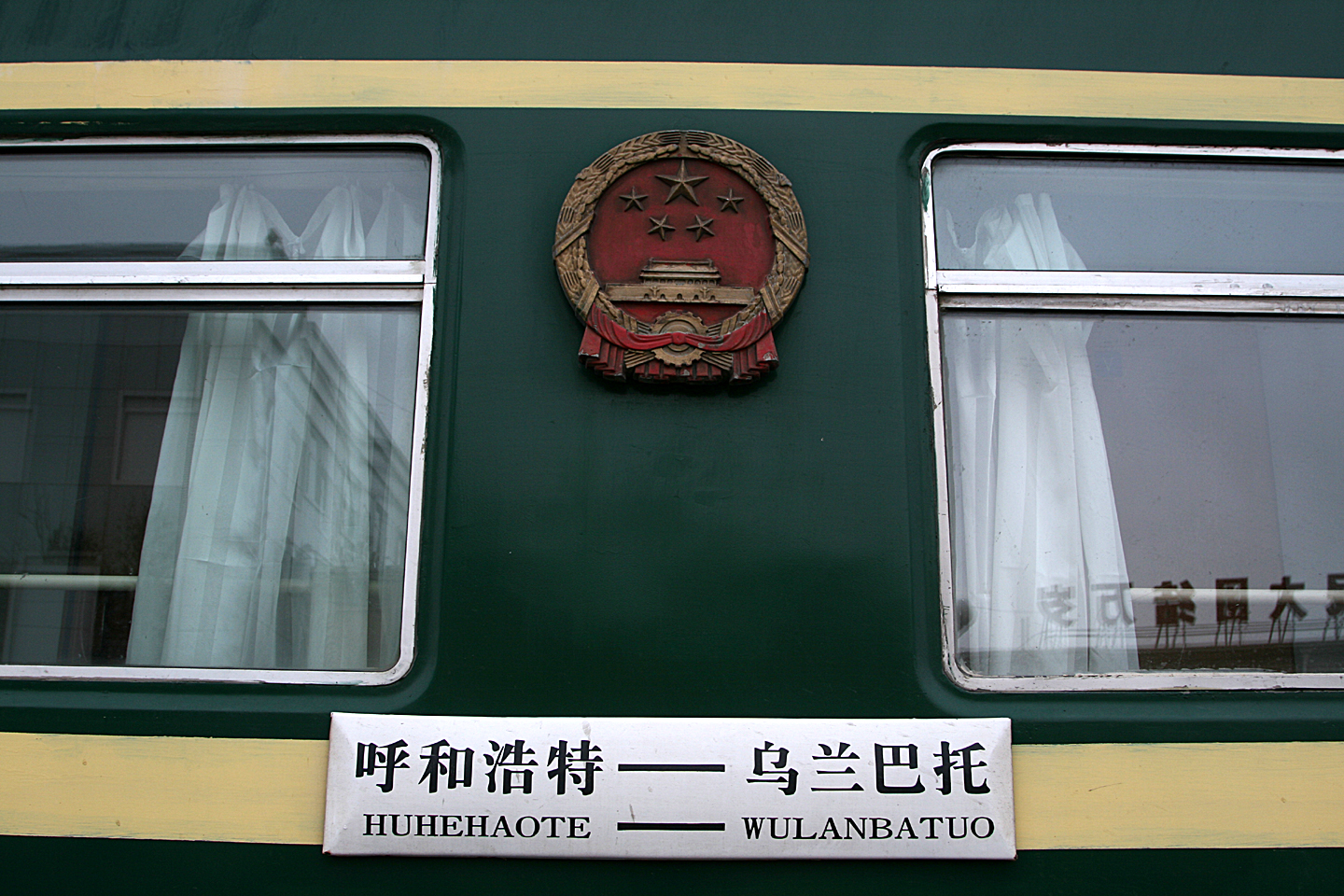

Overview
- Service type: International train
- Current operators: UBTZ; CR Hohhot

Route
- Termini: Hohhot; Ulaanbaatar
- Stops: Zhurihe; Erenhot; Zamin Uud; Choir
- Average journey time: 23 h 38 min（034） 35 h 15 min（033）
- Lines used: Trans-Mongolian; Jining-Erenhot

On-board services
- Classes: Hard sleeper Hard seat
- Sleeping arrangements: Yes

Technical
- Rolling stock: Type 25K; Type 25Z
- Track gauge: 1,435 mm (4 ft 8 1/2 in); 1,524 mm (5 ft)（Russian gauge）
- Electrification: 25kv 50HZ（Hohhot-Jining South）

Train 033/034, designated as 4652/4653 and 4654/4651 within China, is a jointly operated international passenger service run by Mongolian Railways and China Railway. It connects Ulaanbaatar, the capital of Mongolia, with Hohhot, the capital of the Inner Mongolia Autonomous Region in China. Launched on May 31, 1990, this was the first international passenger train service between Inner Mongolia (China) and Outer Mongolia (Mongolia).

The train runs along the Beijing–Baotou Railway, the Jining–Erlian Railway, and the Mongolian north–south main line, traversing Mongolia’s Dornogovi Province, Govisümber Province, Töv Province, and the city of Ulaanbaatar. The entire route covers approximately 1,210 kilometers.

The Mongolian-operated service departs Ulaanbaatar Station every Friday, taking 24 hours and 54 minutes to reach Hohhot on Saturday. The return service departs Hohhot every Monday and takes 36 hours and 6 minutes to reach Ulaanbaatar on Wednesday.

The China Railway-operated train began service on April 28, 1991. It departs Hohhot every Friday and arrives in Ulaanbaatar on Sunday. The return trip leaves Ulaanbaatar on Monday and arrives in Hohhot on Tuesday. The travel times and schedules are consistent with those of the Mongolian-operated service.

== History ==
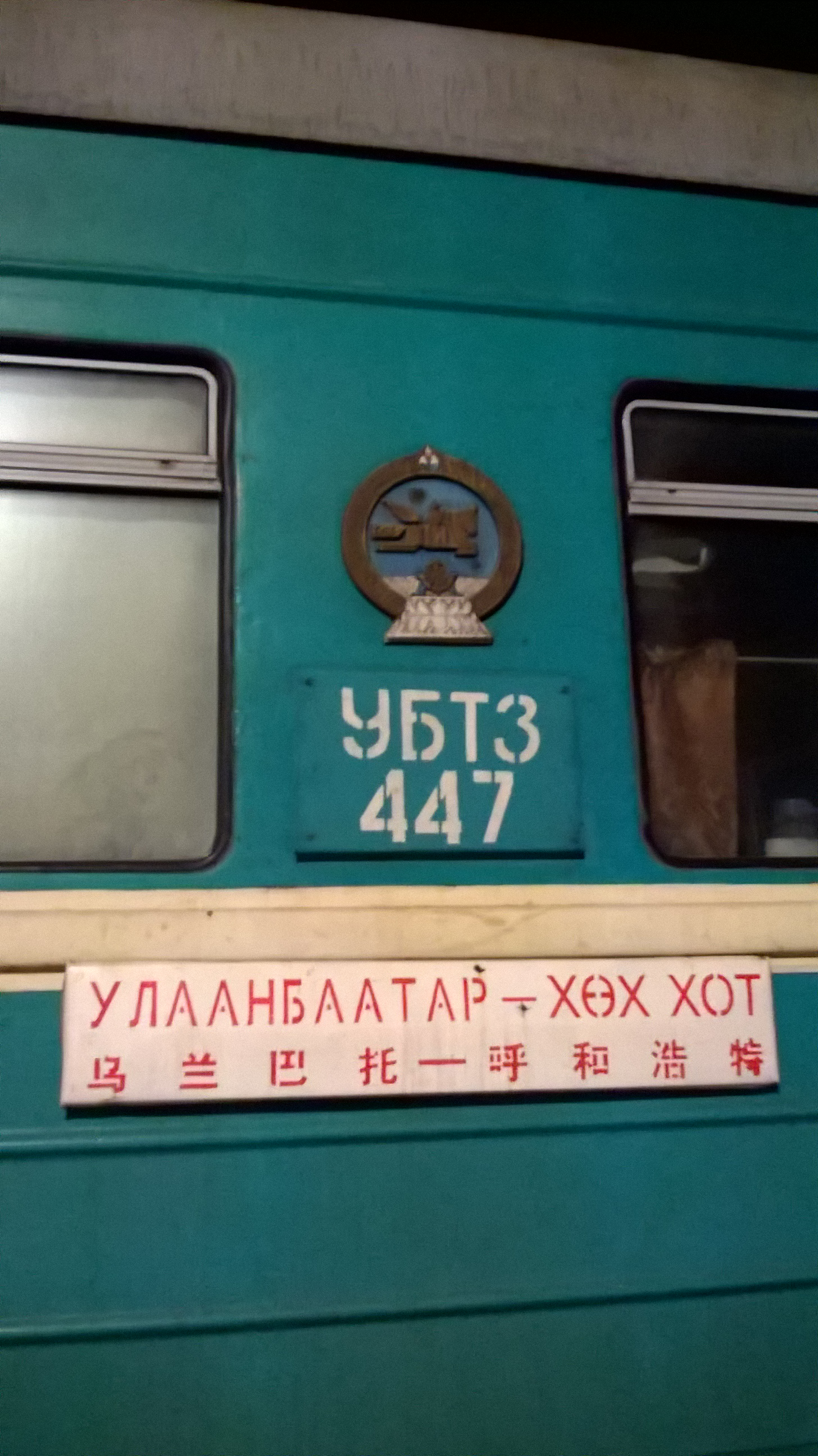
UBTZ train for Ulaanbaatar-Hohhot

On March 15, 1990, a China–Mongolia expert meeting on passenger rail service was held in Ulaanbaatar. At the meeting, both sides agreed to launch a direct passenger train between Ulaanbaatar and Hohhot during the summer season (from May 31 to September 27, 1990). The train was to be operated by Mongolian Railways, which would provide the rolling stock and crew. The service officially began on May 31, operating once a week. It used train numbers 215/216 within Mongolia and 601/602 within China.

On October 7, a multilateral conference on international passenger train scheduling was held in Novosibirsk, with representatives from China, North Korea, Mongolia, and the Soviet Union. During the meeting, it was agreed that both China Railway and Mongolian Railways would share the operation of the direct Hohhot–Ulaanbaatar service.

Subsequently, on December 17, representatives from the Hohhot Railway Bureau (China) and the Ulaanbaatar Railway Bureau (Mongolia) met in Hohhot and reached a formal agreement to launch a year-round direct passenger service between Hohhot and Ulaanbaatar starting in 1991. Each railway would operate one round-trip per week. The agreement also covered the timetable, service dates, ticketing, financial settlement, and technical standards for the train.

On April 28, 1991, China Railway officially launched its own international direct passenger train between Hohhot and Ulaanbaatar, providing both rolling stock and crew. This marked the first year-round international train service operated by China Railway to a foreign capital outside of Beijing.

Due to COVID-19, train services suspended from 14 February 2024. Services resumed from 15 March 2024.

From 31 October 2025, due to technichal reasons, CR coaches between Hohhot and Ulaanbaatar are suspended, however UBTZ Ulaanbaatar-Hohhot service remains operational.

Due to low ridership, trains from Ulaanbaatar to Erenhot departing on Thursday and Sunday 20:22 are suspended from 12 December 2025 to 5 January 2026.

From 9 January 2026, the rolling stock was upgraded to air-conditioned Type 25K and 25Z coaches, Type 25B and Type 18 coaches retired from service and rescheduling the departure time. All outbound and inbound passengers must change trains in Erenhot.

== Train composition ==
=== Hohhot – Erenhot Section ===
The Hohhot–Erenhot section operates with a mixed consist of China Railway 25K Passenger Car and China Railway 25Z Passenger Car coaches assigned to the Baotou Passenger Car Depot of the Hohhot Railway Bureau. Between Hohhot and Erenhot, the train is formed of 11 cars, including four hard-sleeper coaches, four hard-seat coaches, two soft-sleeper coaches, one dining car, and one air-conditioning power generator car. Cars No. 1 and No. 2 are designated for international through passengers. The hard-seat coaches are 25Z-type passenger cars marked with 25K livery.

Section	Hohhot↔Erenhot					
Coach	A1	1-2	3-5	6	7-10	11
Type	YW25K Hard Sleeper	RW25K Soft Sleeper	YW25K Hard Sleeper	CA25K Canteen	YZ25K Hard Seat	KD25K Air Con
Operator	CR Hohhot					

=== Ulaanbaatar – Erenhot Section ===
On the Ulaanbaatar–Erenhot section, the train uses rolling stock operated by Mongolian Railway. The consist is formed of Russian-style passenger coaches of Mongolian Railways manufactured in Germany. The carriage bodies are marked with “-36” (Russian: мест, pronounced /mʲest/, meaning “capacity: 36 persons”).

The train formation includes seven hard-sleeper coaches, one dining car, and one baggage car. Cars No. 1 and No. 2 are reserved for passengers traveling beyond Erenhot Station, and their destination boards display the Mongolian-language route “Hohhot–Ulaanbaatar.” The remaining coaches are intended for passengers boarding or alighting at Erenhot Station, with destination boards displaying “Erenhot–Ulaanbaatar” in Mongolian.

Car No. 0 and the dining car are coupled and uncoupled at Zamyn-Üüd Station, and do not enter China together with the passenger coaches.

Section	Erenhot↔Ulaanbaatar		Zamyn Uud↔Ulaanbaatar	
Coach	Nil	1-6	0	Nil
Type	МЕСТ БАГАЖНЫИ Baggage	МЕСТ-36 Kupe	МЕСТ-36 Kupe	МЕСТ РЕСТОРАН Restaurant
Operator	UBTZ			

=== Former composition ===
Train 4652/4653 and 4654/4651 operates using CR25B-type coaches assigned to the Baotou Coach Depot of the Hohhot Railway Bureau. On the Hohhot–Erlian segment, the train is composed of five coaches: three hard sleeper cars and two hard seat cars. For the international leg between Hohhot and Ulaanbaatar, the formation includes two additional through coaches.

On the Mongolian side, the train departing Ulaanbaatar every Friday and returning from Hohhot every Monday uses a Russian-style coach manufactured in Germany. This car is marked МЕСТ-36 (pronounced /mʲest/, meaning "36 berths") and serves as a hard sleeper coach.

On the Chinese side, the train departing Hohhot every Friday and returning from Ulaanbaatar every Monday includes two cars: one soft sleeper and one hard sleeper coach, both of which are Type 18 coaches from China Railway.

At Erenhot Station (二连站), the train is coupled with or separated from train 683/684, which operates between Erenhot and Ulaanbaatar. Additionally, the train undergoes a reversal (change of direction) at Jining South Station (集宁南站).

The Mongolian crew is provided by the UBTZ, while the Chinese crew is assigned from the CR Hohhot.

Because Mongolia uses the Russian broad gauge (1520 mm) and China uses the standard gauge (1435 mm), bogie exchange is necessary at Erenhot whenever the train crosses the border. The entire train is lifted using special hoisting equipment, the original bogies are rolled out, and new ones of the appropriate gauge are rolled in and mounted. This process, along with border inspections, typically requires a stop of about three hours at Erenhot.

Passengers may choose to stay on the train to observe the bogie-changing operation or disembark and rest inside the station building.

==== Hohhot-Erenhot section ====
Section	Hohhot↔Erenhot	Hohhot↔Ulaanbaatar（UBTZ / CR）			Hohhot↔Erenhot	
Coach	3	A1-2	1	2	4-5	6-7
Type	YW25B Hard sleeper	МЕСТ-36 Kupe	RW18 Soft sleeper	YW18 Hard sleeper	YW25B; Hard sleeper	YZ25B Hard seat
Operator	CR Hohhot	UBTZ	CR Hohhot		CR Hohhot	

==== Erenhot-Ulaanbaatar section ====
Section	Hohhot↔Ulaanbaatar	Erenhot↔Ulaanbaatar
Coach	1-2	3-6
Type	МЕСТ-36 Kupe	МЕСТ-36 Kupe
Operator	UBTZ	

== Loco shift ==
Within China, Train 4652/4653 and 4654/4651 is operated by locomotives provided by CR Hohhot. The locomotive assignment is as follows:

- From Hohhot to Jining South: The train is hauled by an HXD3C electric locomotive, with crew from CR Hohhot.
- From Jining South to Erenhot (Erlian): The train switches to a DF4D (Dongfeng 4D) diesel locomotive, operated by CR Hohhot.

These locomotive changes reflect the electrification status and operational requirements along the route.

Section	Hohhot ↔ Jining South	Jinning South ↔ Erenhot	Erenhot↔ Zamin Uud	Zamin Uud ↔ Ulaanbaatar
Loco Operator Shift	HXD3C CR Hohhot Hohhot	DF4D CR Hohhot Jining	CKD4B UBTZ UBTZ shift	2M62MM 2TE116UM UBTZ UBTZ shift

== Timetable ==
- No time difference between China and Mongolia, statistics updated to 9 January 2026

034/684/4654、4651				Stops	4652、4653/683/033			
Train no.	Day	Arrival	Departure	Stops	Arrival	Departure	Day	Train no.
034	Day 1	—	20:22	Ulaanbaatar	10:05	—	Day 3	033
034	Day 1	↓	↓	Amgalan	09:48	09:53	Day 3	033
034	Day 2	00:42	01:00	Choir	05:19	05:49	Day 3	033
034	Day 2	04:23	04:54	Sainshand	01:10	01:50	Day 3	033
034/684	Day 2	08:30	10:00	Zamin Uud	17:35	21:35	Day 2	683/033
↑ Mongolia（MST UTC+08:00） / China（CST UTC+08:00） ↓
684/4654	Day 2	10:25	12:45	Erenhot	06:50	17:10	Day 2	4653/683
4654	Day 2	10:25	12:45	Erenhot	06:50	17:10	Day 2	4653
4654	Day 2	14:22	14:31	Saikhan Tal	05:02	05:10	Day 2	4653
4654	Day 2	15:07	15:11	Zhurihe	↑	↑	Day 2	4653
4654	Day 2	16:08	16:11	Tumurtai	↑	↑	Day 2	4653
4654	Day 2	16:35	16:48	Ulaan Khata	↑	↑	Day 2	4653
4654	Day 2	17:07	17:10	Bayan Tsagaan	01:52	01:55	Day 2	4653
4654/4651	Day 2	18:10	18:26	Jining South	00:36	00:59	Day 1	4652/4653
4651	Day 2	20:00	—	Hohhot	—	22:50	Day 1	4652

== See also ==
- China Railway K3/4
- China Railway K23/24
- Visa policy of Mongolia
- Trans-Mongolian railway
