= Trans-Mongolian Railway =

International railway line in Mongolia

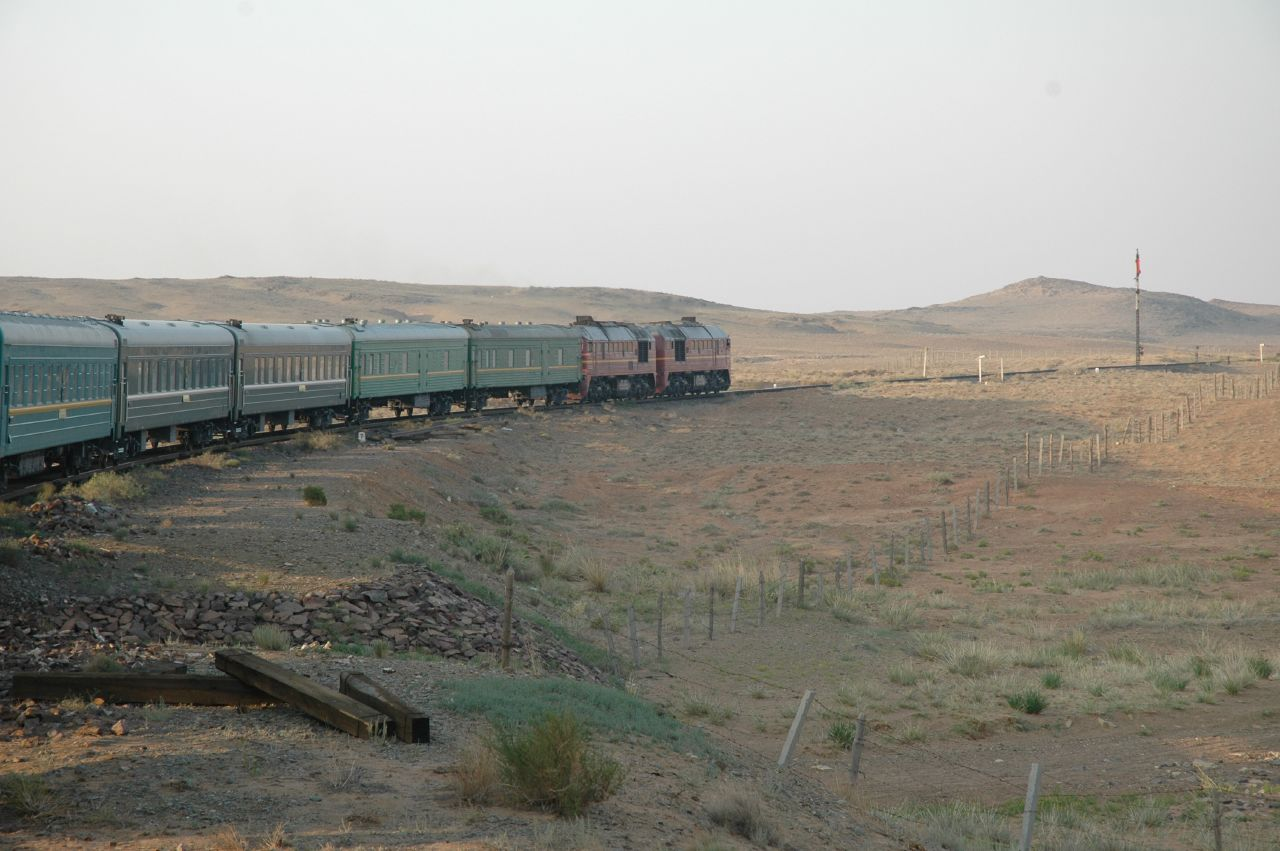
- Trans-Mongolian Railway in the Gobi Desert

Overview
- Locale: North and East Asia
- Termini: Ulan-Ude, Buryatia, Russia; Ulanqab, Inner Mongolia, China
- Stations: 62

Service
- Type: Heavy rail
- Operator(s): Russian Railways, UBTZ, China Railway

History
- Commenced: 1937; 89 years ago
- Opened: 1949; 77 years ago (Russia–Ulaanbaatar); 1956; 70 years ago (Ulaanbaatar–China)

Technical
- Line length: 2,215 km (1,376 mi)
- Number of tracks: Mostly single, significant sections of double
- Character: International rail link
- Track gauge: 1,520 mm (4 ft 11 27/32 in) (Russia–Mongolia); 1,435 mm (4 ft 8 1/2 in) (China)
- Electrification: None, plans to electrify at 25 kV AC
- Operating speed: 100 km/h (62 mph)

The Trans-Mongolian Railway (Mongolian: Транс-Монголын төмөр зам, romanized: Trans-Mongoliin tömör zam, pronounced [tʰr̥áns‿mɔɴɢɞ̆ɮíŋ tʰɵ́mɵ̆r̥ t͡sam]) connects Ulan-Ude on the Trans-Siberian Railway in Buryatia, Russia, with Ulanchab in Inner Mongolia, China, via Ulaanbaatar, Mongolia. It was completed in 1956, and runs from northwest to southeast with major stations at Naushki/Sükhbaatar on the Russian border, Darkhan, Züünkharaa, Choir, Sainshand, and Zamyn-Üüd/Erenhot on the Chinese border, where the railway changes from single-track to double-track and its gauge changes from 1,520 mm Russian gauge to 1,435 mm standard gauge. The railway also has important branch lines to Erdenet and Baganuur.

== History ==
Map of Mongolia's rail network

Railway development came late to Mongolia. In 1937, a line was built from Ulan-Ude in the Soviet Union to Naushki on the border with Mongolia. In 1939, a paved road was extended to Ulaanbaatar, the country's capital. Construction of a rail line from Naushki to Ulaanbaatar was delayed by World War II, and completed in November 1949. The Soviet Union, Mongolia, and the People's Republic of China agreed to extend the line from Ulaanbaatar to the Chinese border. In Mongolia, the railway was built by the Soviet 505th Penal Unit, made up of soldiers mainly imprisoned for surrendering during the war. The railway was opened by Inner Mongolian leader Ulanhu on 1 January 1956.

In 1958, the railway switched to diesel engines and automated switching. Branches were built to the coal mines at Sharyngol in 1963 (63 km (39 mi)) and at Baganuur in 1982 (85 km (53 mi)), the copper mine at Erdenet in 1975 (164 km (102 mi)), the fluorspar mine at Bor-Öndör in 1987 (60 km (37 mi)), and the oil refinery at Züünbayan (63 km (39 mi)). Modernization in the 1990s replaced some old Soviet-made locomotives with more powerful American models, and installed fiber-optic trackside cables for communications and signaling. In 2022, lines opened linking the branch at Züünbayan with Khangi on the Chinese border, and the coal mines at Tavan Tolgoi with Gashuun Sukhait on the border. A new line linking Züünbayan with Tavan Tolgoi is under construction.

== Operation ==
The 1,110 kilometres (690 mi) of the railway in Mongolia (as of 2017) are managed by UBTZ (the Ulaanbaatar Railway Company), a 50/50 Russian–Mongolian joint-stock company. Rail transport in Mongolia, which also includes the unconnected Choibalsan–Borzya line built in 1938–39, in 1998 carried 96 percent of the country's freight transportation and 55 percent of passenger traffic. In Mongolia it is mostly single-tracked, with some 60 stations and double-tracked passing sidings.

At Erenhot station in Inner Mongolia, the railway's 1,520 mm (4 ft 11 27/32 in) Russian gauge track meets with China's 1,435 mm (4 ft 8 1/2 in) standard gauge. There are trans-shipping facilities and rolling-stock equipment for bogie exchange. As of 2000, the railway had nine container terminals, the largest at Zamyn-Üüd, and UBTZ operated 60 locomotives, 300 passenger cars, and 2,400 freight wagons, including 140 container wagons. The primary international service on the railway is the China Railway K3/4 train, which began service in 1959 and connects Beijing with Moscow.

=== Services ===
- International services:
  - 003/004 (Beijing–Moscow)
  - 033/034 (Ulaanbaatar–Erenhot–Hohhot)
  - 023/024 (Ulaanbaatar–Beijing)
  - 305/306 (Ulaanbaatar–Irkutsk)
- Domestic services:
  - 275/276 (Ulaanbaatar–Zamin Uud)
  - 271/272, 263/264 (Ulaanbaatar–Darkhan–Sukhbaatar)
  - 285/286 (Ulaanbaatar–Sainshand)
  - 311/312 (Ulaanbaatar–Erdenet)

== Proposed lines ==
A 2010 Mongolian government plan proposed 5,683.5 kilometres (3,531.6 mi) of new track, for the primary purpose of connecting Dalanzadgad and Choibalsan, to be built in three stages:

- the first stage, totaling 1,100 kilometres (680 mi) and linking Dalanzadgad–Tavan Tolgoi mine–Tsagaan Suvarga mine–Züünbayan (400 km (250 mi)), Sainshand–Baruun-Urt (350 km (220 mi)), Baruun-Urt–Khööt mine (140 km (87 mi)), and Khööt–Choibalsan (200 km (120 mi));
- the second stage, totaling 900 kilometres (560 mi) and connecting the first stage with the Chinese border, linking Nariin Sukhait mine–Shivee Khüren (45.5 km (28.3 mi)), Tavan Tolgoi–Gashuun Sukhait (267 km (166 mi)), Khööt–Tamsagbulag–Nömrög (380 km (240 mi)), and Khööt–Bichigt (200 km (120 mi)); and
- the third stage, totaling 3,600 kilometres (2,200 mi)) and not described in detail, but including a link with Tsagaannuur on the Russian border and a line from Ulaanbaatar to Kharkhorin.

In 2012, a line connecting Erdenet–Mörön–Ovoot mine–Arts Suuri on the Russian border (547 km (340 mi)) was approved, but never built. In 2014, it was announced that the planned Tavan Tolgoi–Gashuun Sukhait and Khööt–Bichigt lines were to be of Chinese gauge, while the Dalanzadgad–Choibalsan, Khööt–Nömrög, and Erdenet–Artssuuri lines were to be of Russian gauge. In 2016, a line linking Züünbayan to Khangi on the Chinese border (280 km (170 mi)) was approved; it was completed in 2023. A 2017 government plan, greatly reduced in scope from the 2010 one, proposed linking Khööt–Choibalsan, Nariin Sukhait–Shivee Khüren, Khööt–Bichigt, and Züünbayan–Khangi.

== Gallery ==
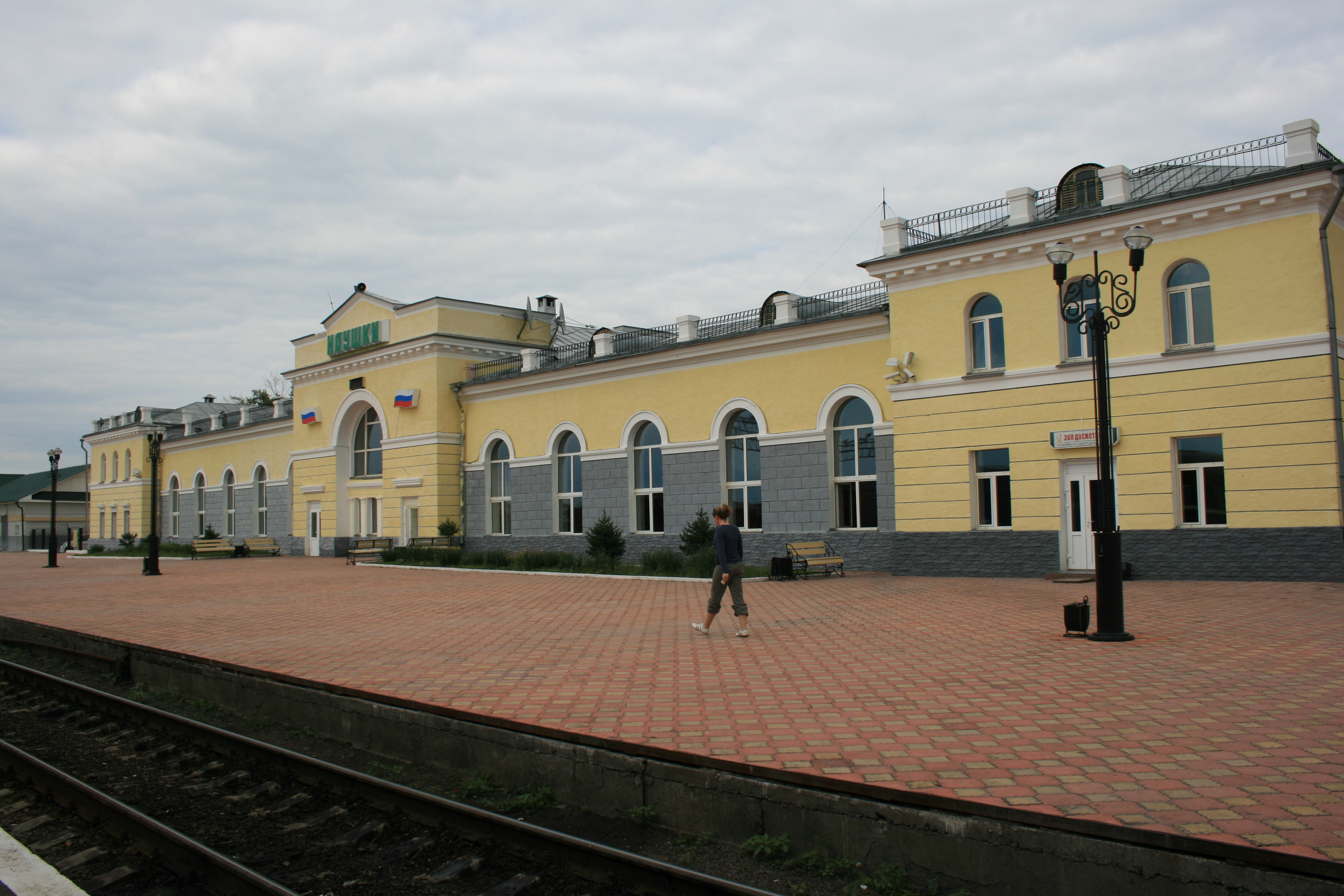
Naushki station on the Russian border, 2009

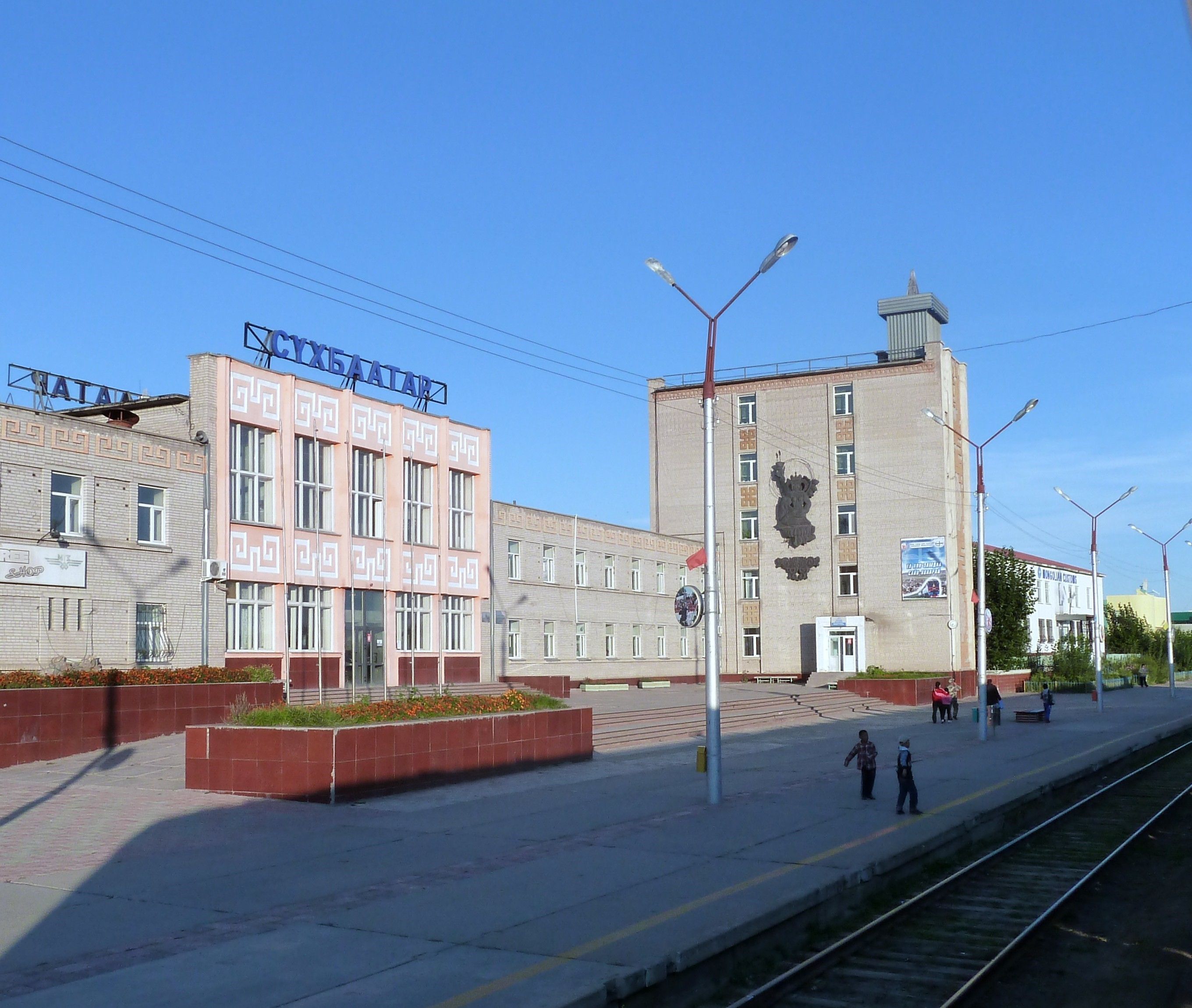
Sükhbaatar station, 2011

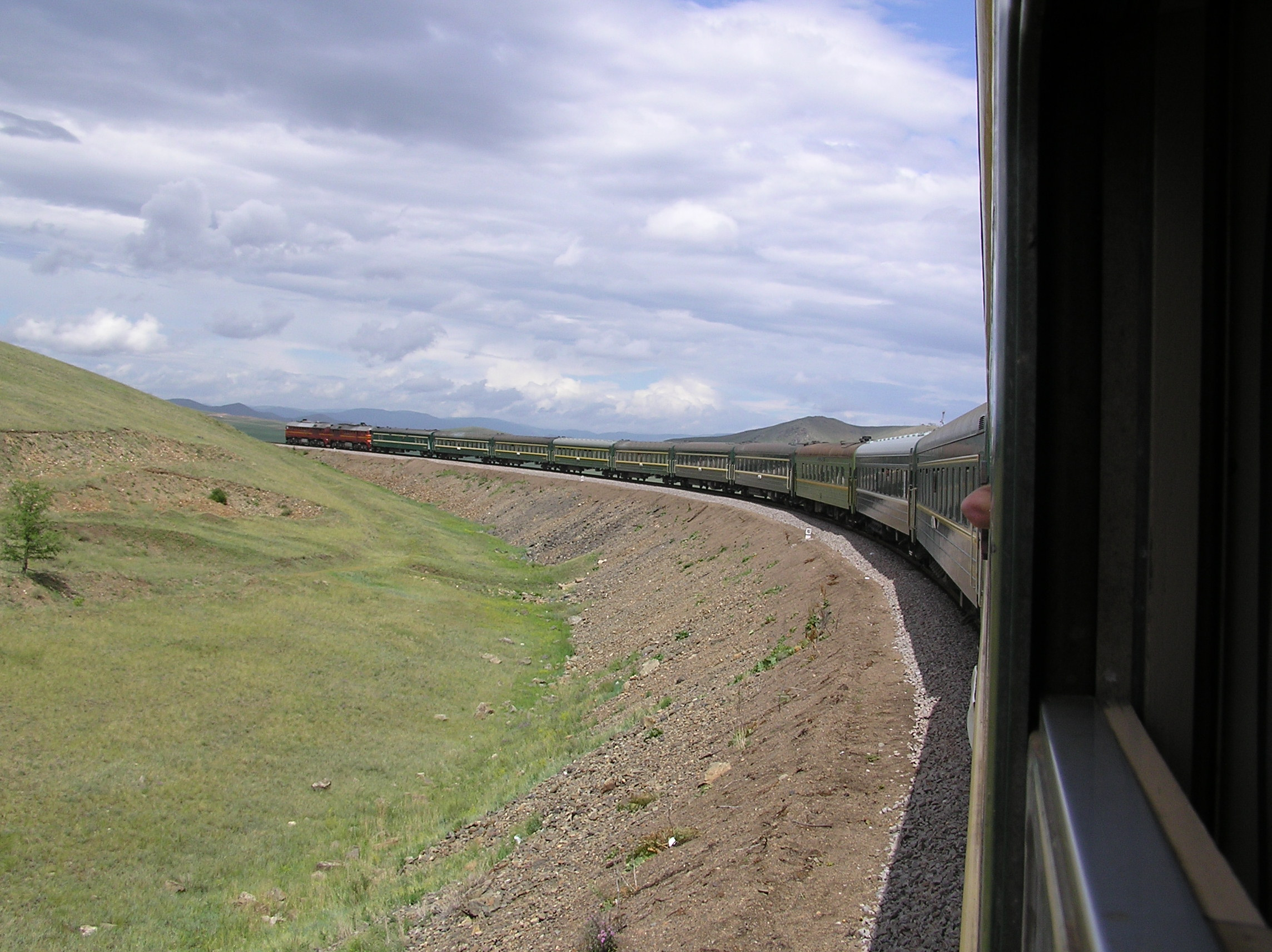
Train on the railway on the Mongolian steppe

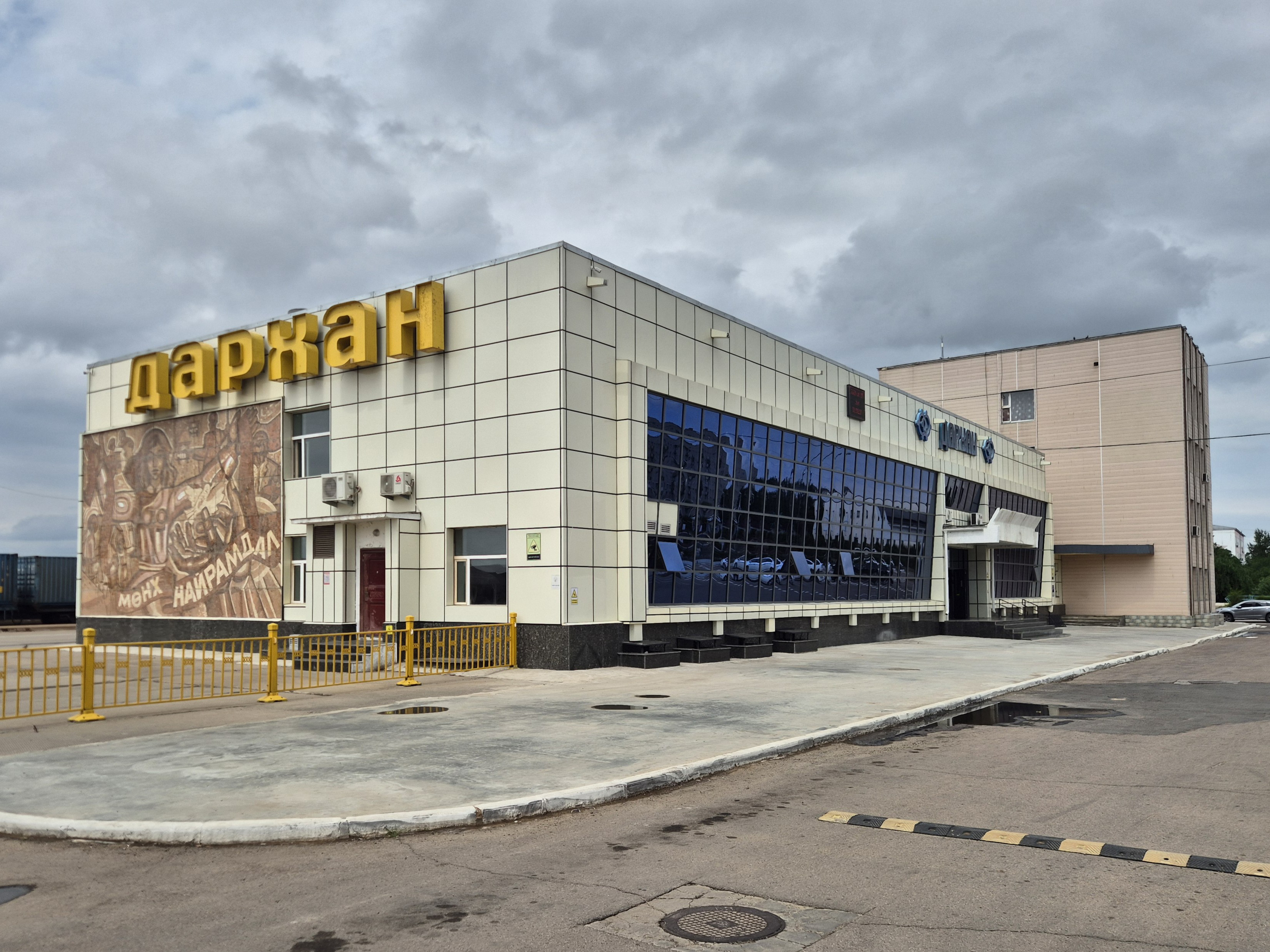
Darkhan station, 2025

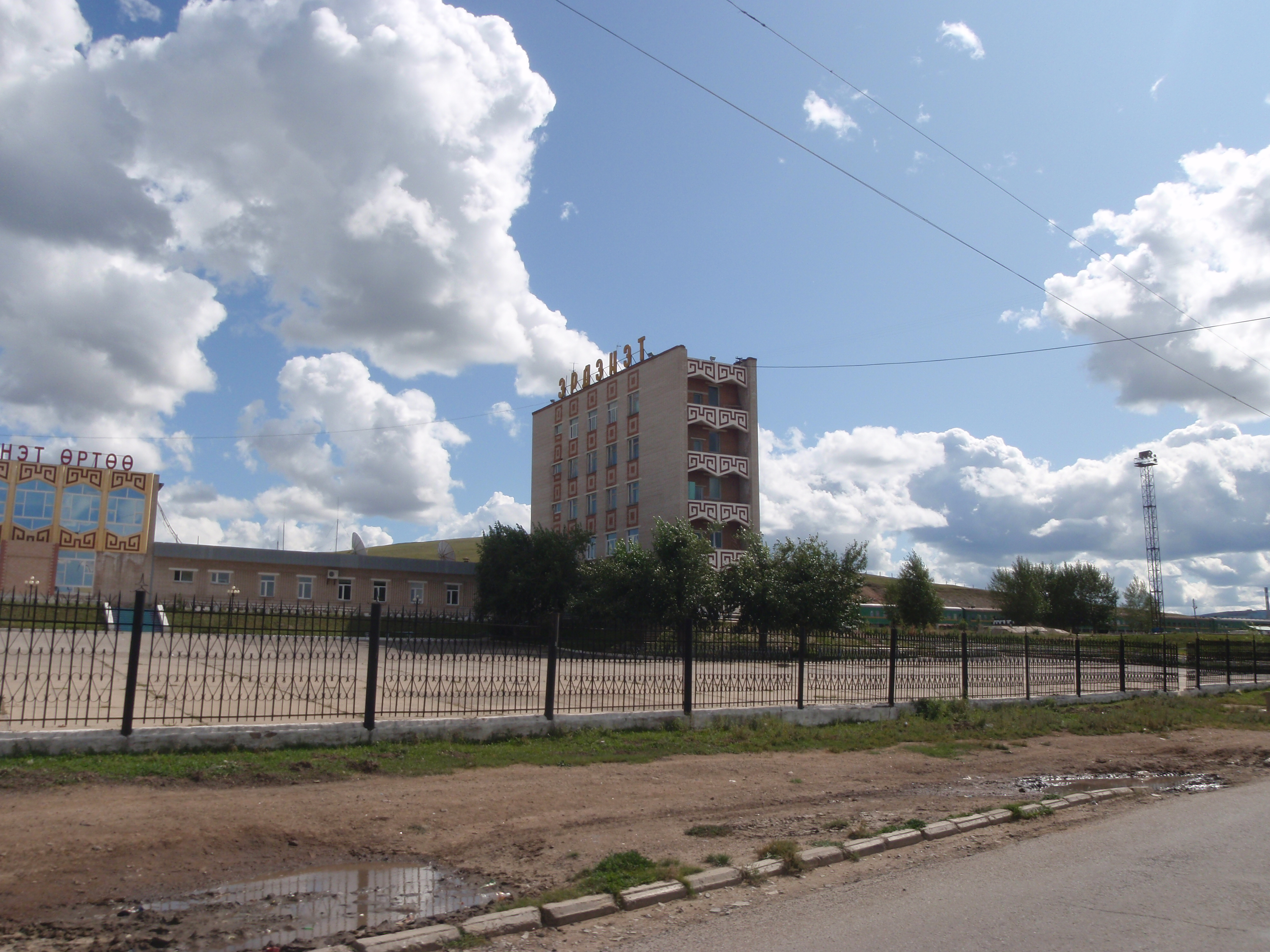
Erdenet branch station, 2009

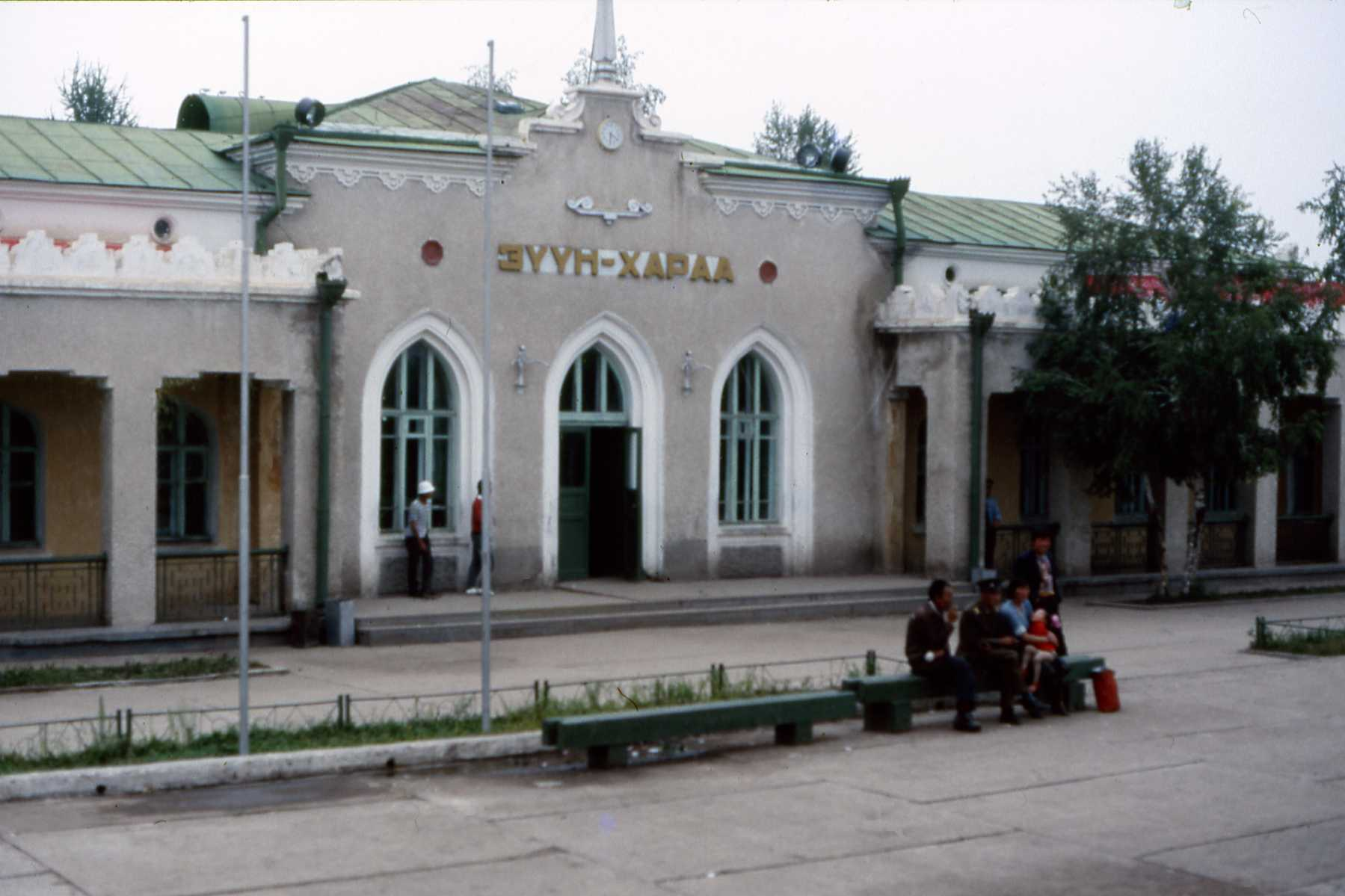
Züünkharaa station, 1985

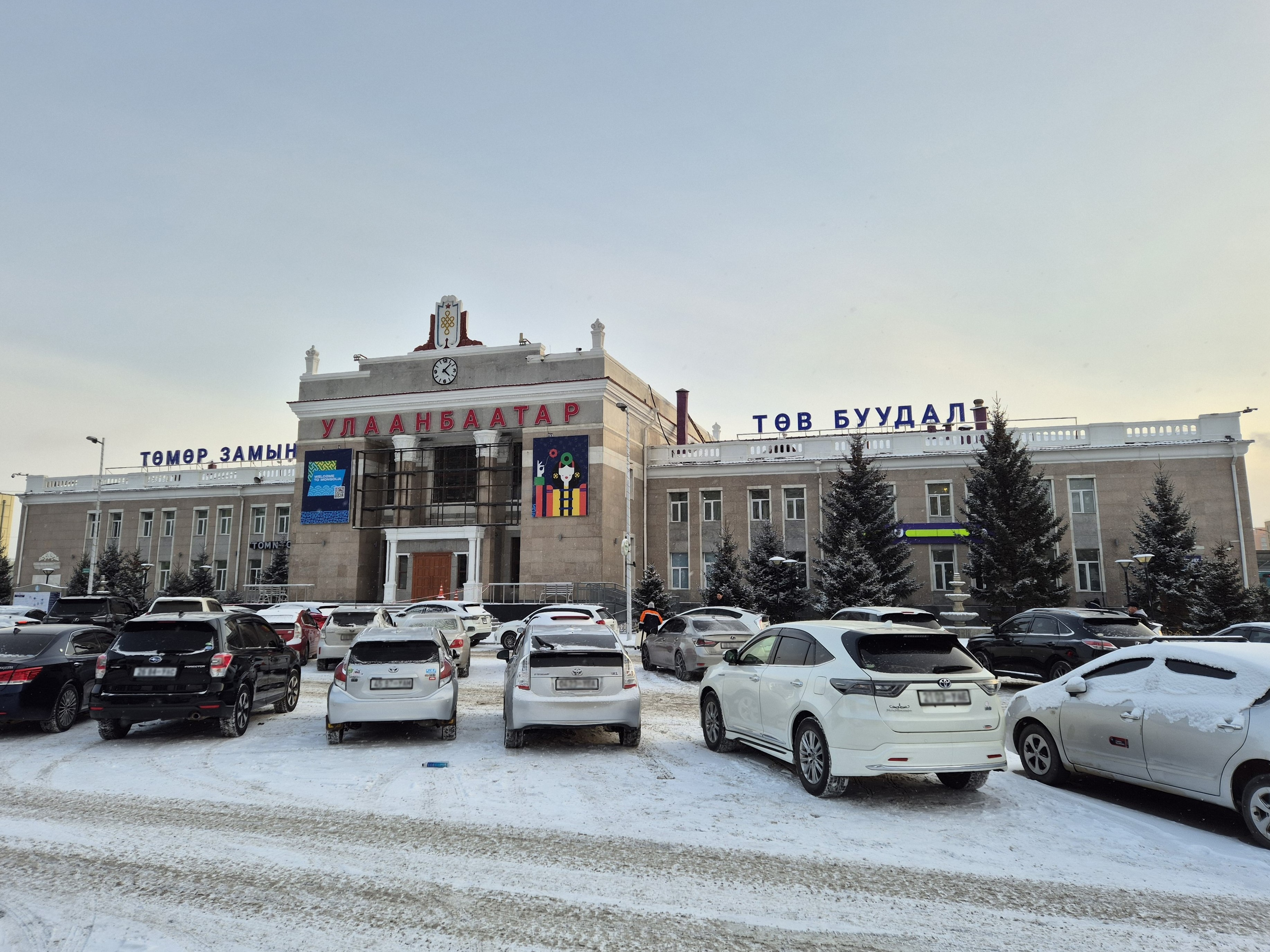
Ulaanbaatar station, 2024

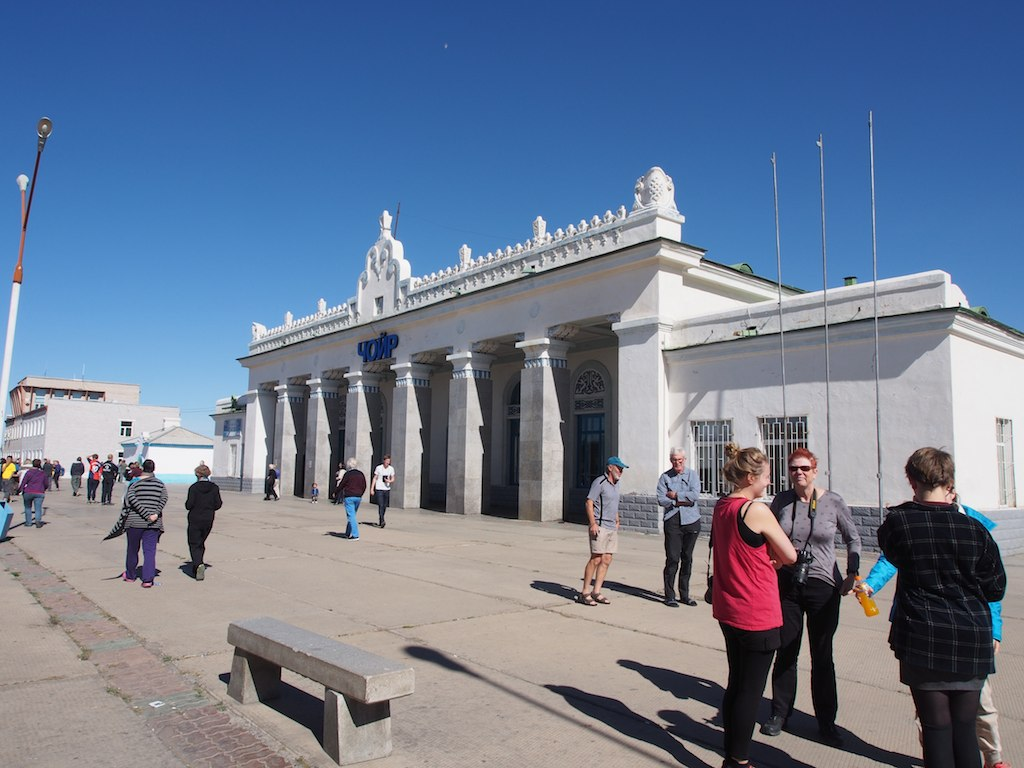
Choir station, 2013

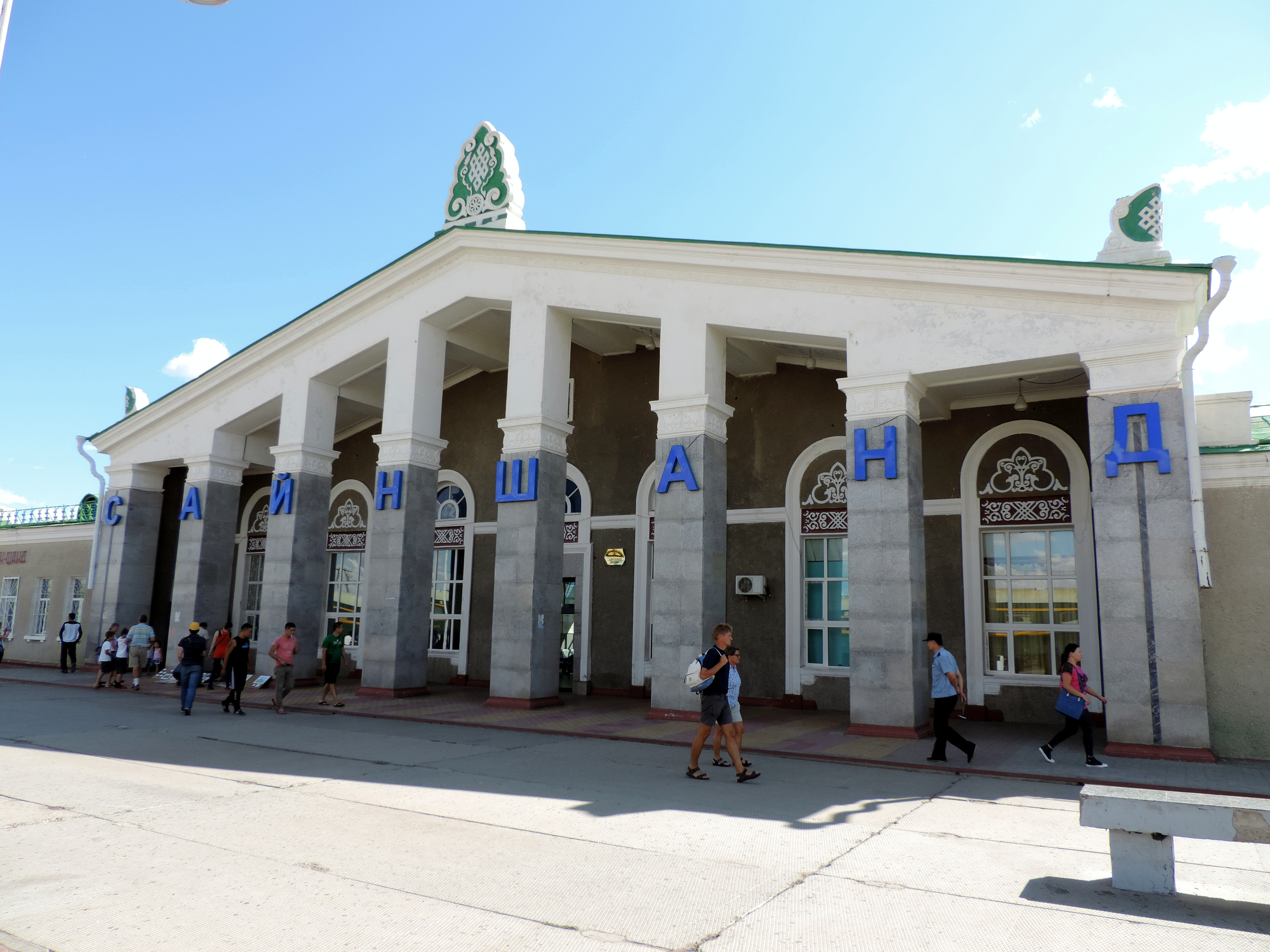
Sainshand station, 2013

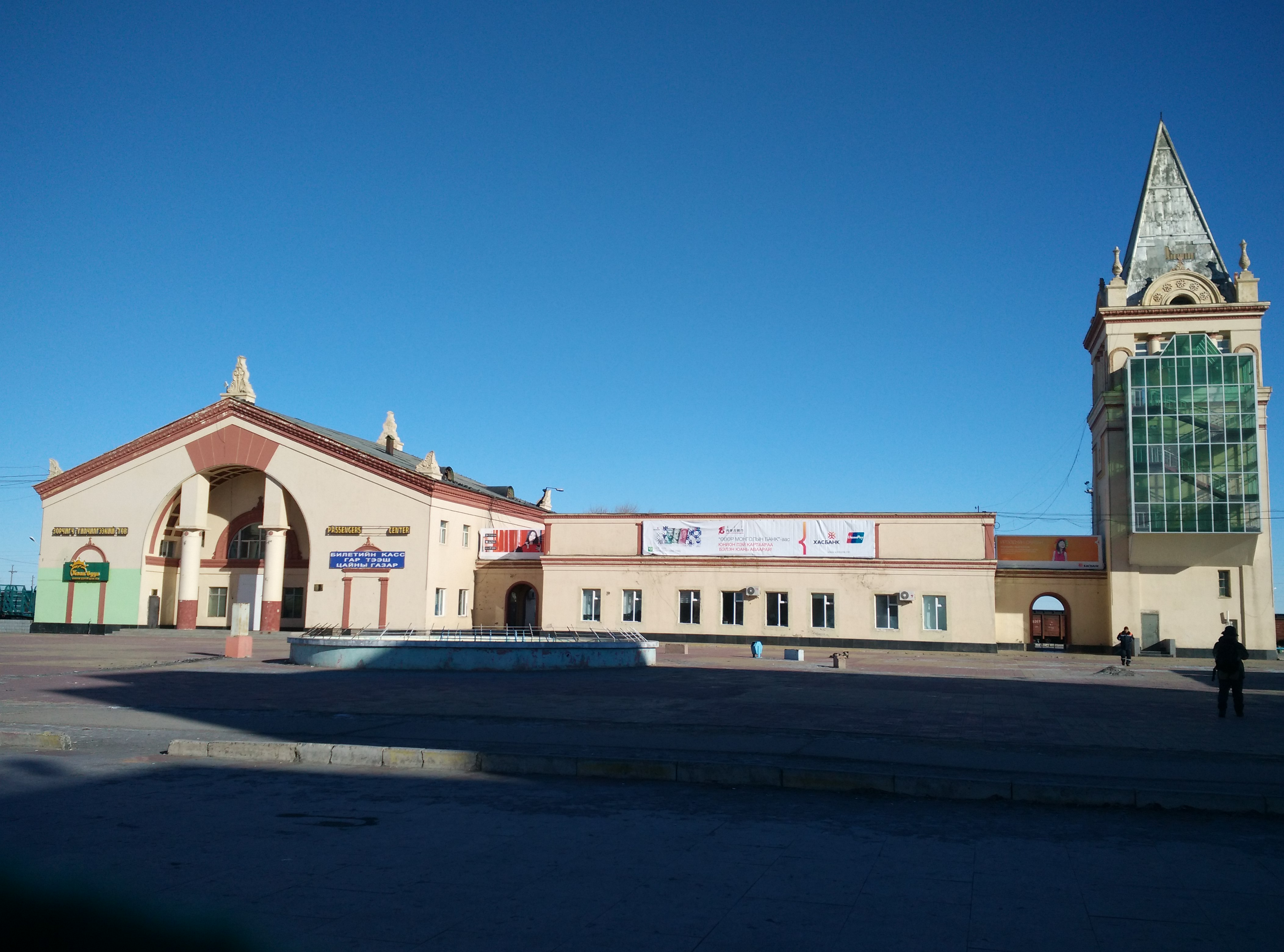
Zamyn-Üüd station, 2016

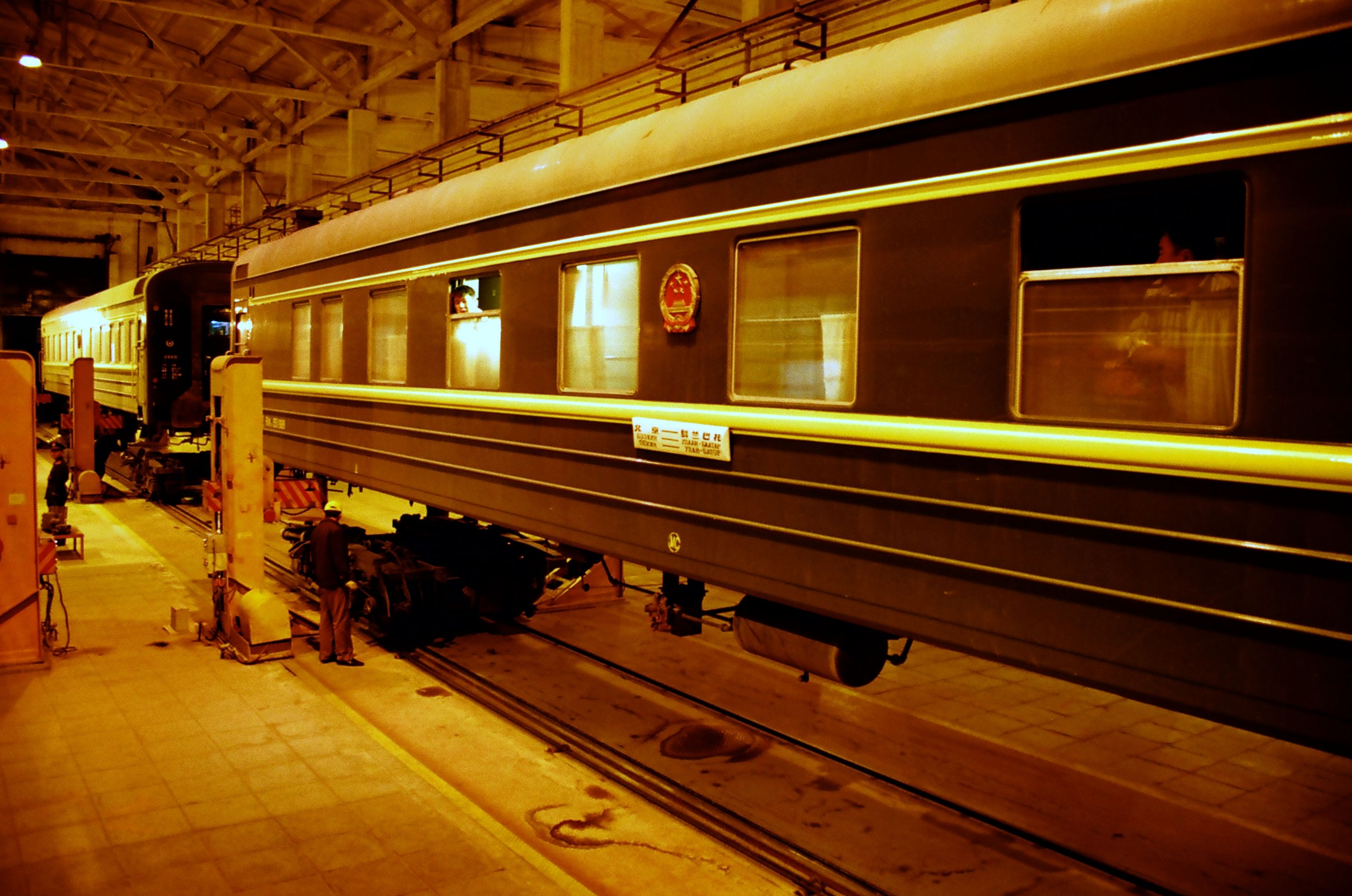
Bogie exchange at Erenhot station on the Chinese border

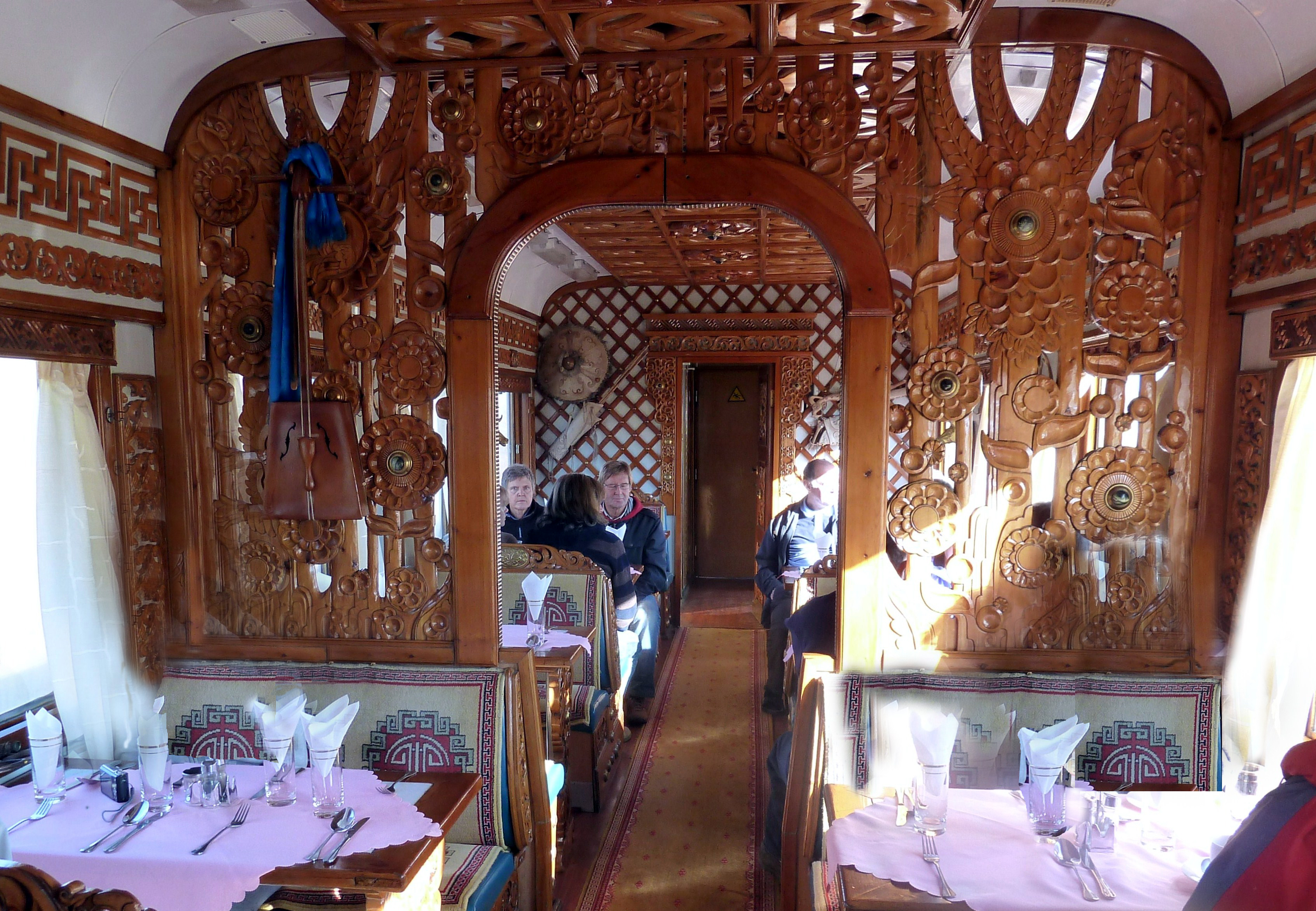
Dining car on a China Railway K3/4 train

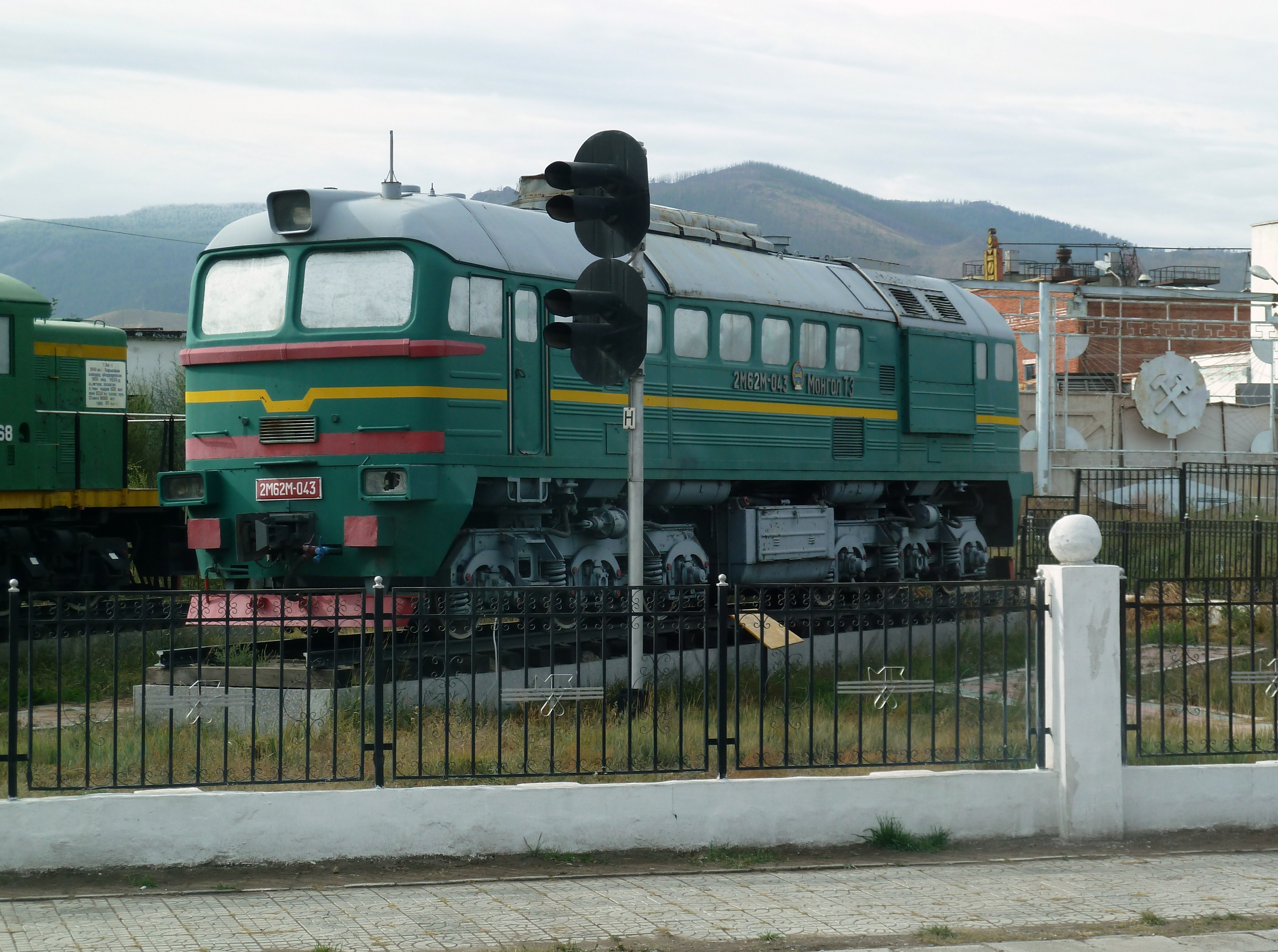
2M62M locomotive

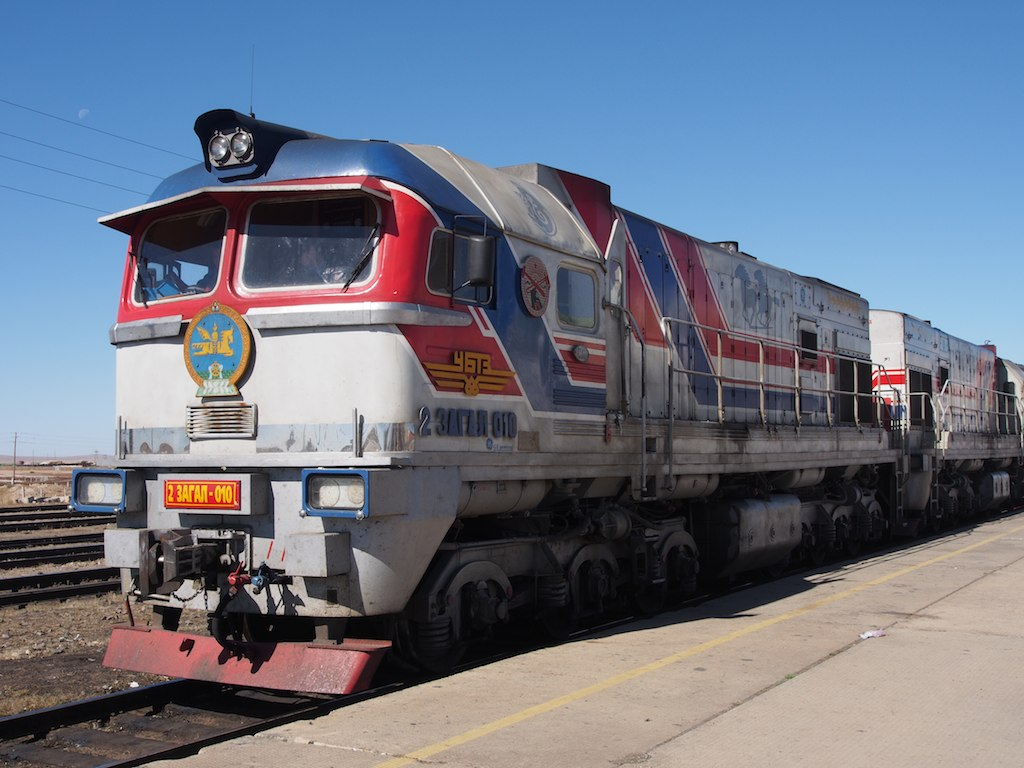
2Zagal locomotive
