= Beijing–Ulaanbaatar through train =

Train service in China and Mongolia

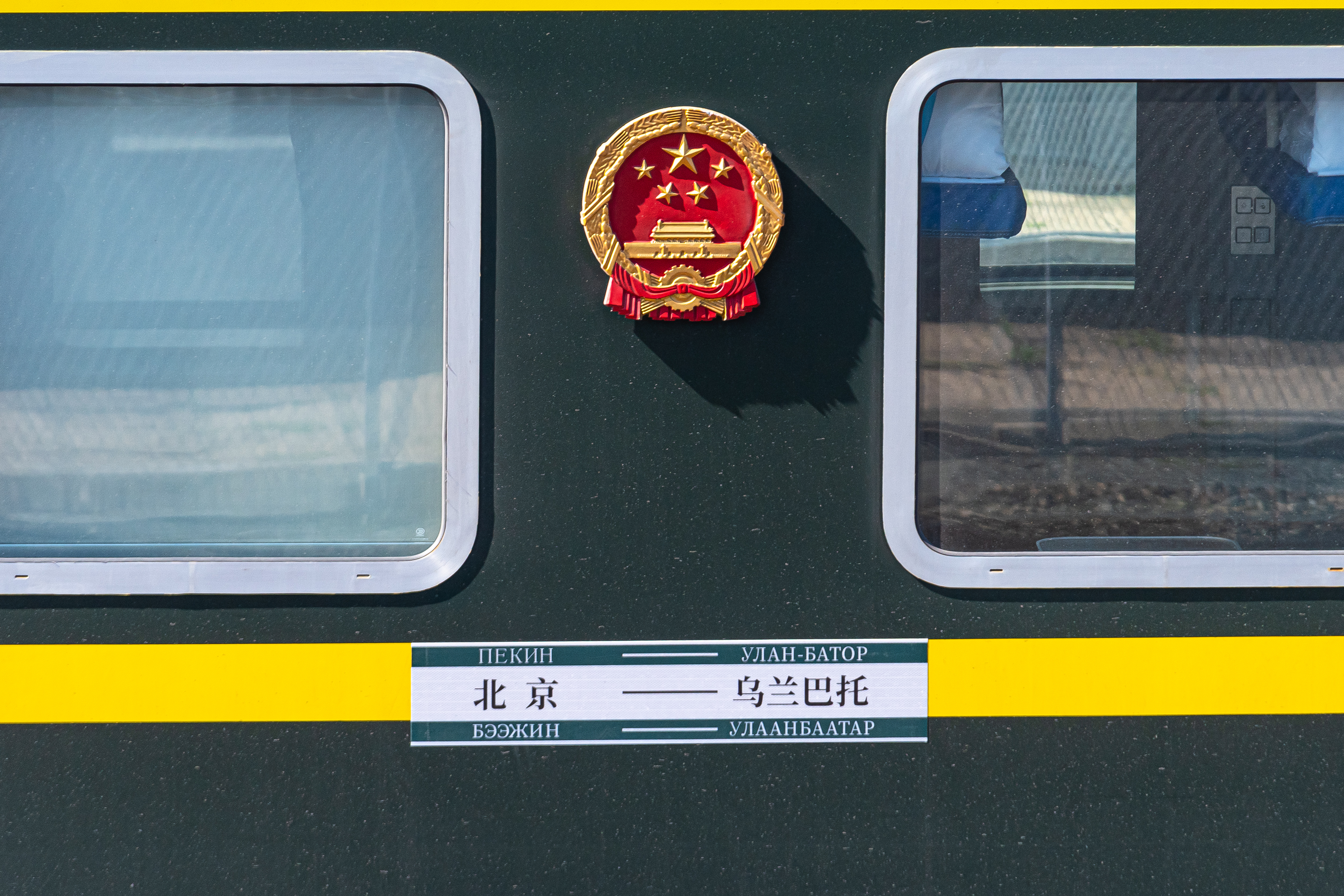
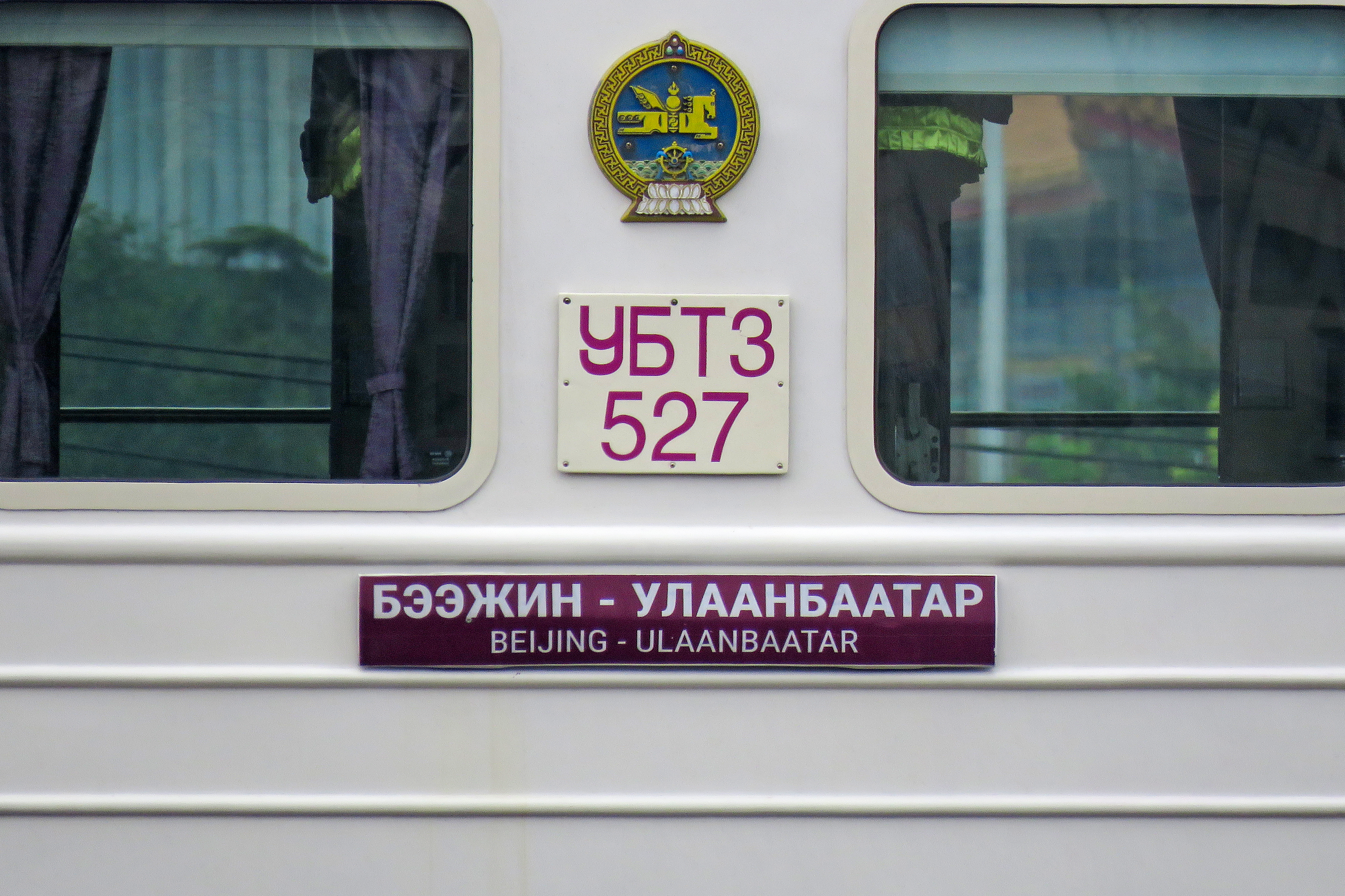
- CR train for K23/24 on the left and UBTZ train for K23/24 on the right

Overview
- Service type: Express (K-train); International train
- Locale: East Asia
- First service: 2 July 1985
- Current operators: CR Beijing; Ulaanbaatar Railways

Route
- Termini: Beijing; Ulaanbaatar
- Stops: 8
- Average journey time: 31 hours, 8 minutes (K23); 31 hours, 17 minutes (K24）
- Service frequency: Beijing：Tues 07:27; Ulaanbaatar：Thurs 07:18
- Train number: K23/24

On-board services
- Classes: Premium sleeper Soft sleeper (1st class, CR trains only） Hard sleeper (2nd class） Canteen
- Sleeping arrangements: Yes
- Catering facilities: Canteen coach (CR Beijing and UBTZ)
- Baggage facilities: Luggage coach

Technical
- Rolling stock: CR 25G coaches MECT coaches
- Track gauge: 1,435 mm (4 ft 8 1/2 in) (China); 1,520 mm (4 ft 11 27/32 in) Russian gauge (Russia and Mongolia）
- Electrification: 25kv 50HZ overhead line（Beijing–Jining South）

Train K23/24, also known as 023/024 in Mongolia, is an international express train (K-train) jointly operated by CR Beijng and Ulaanbaatar Railways. The train commenced operations from 2 July 1985 by CR Beijing, and joined by Mongolian Railways from 5 June 1986.

== History ==
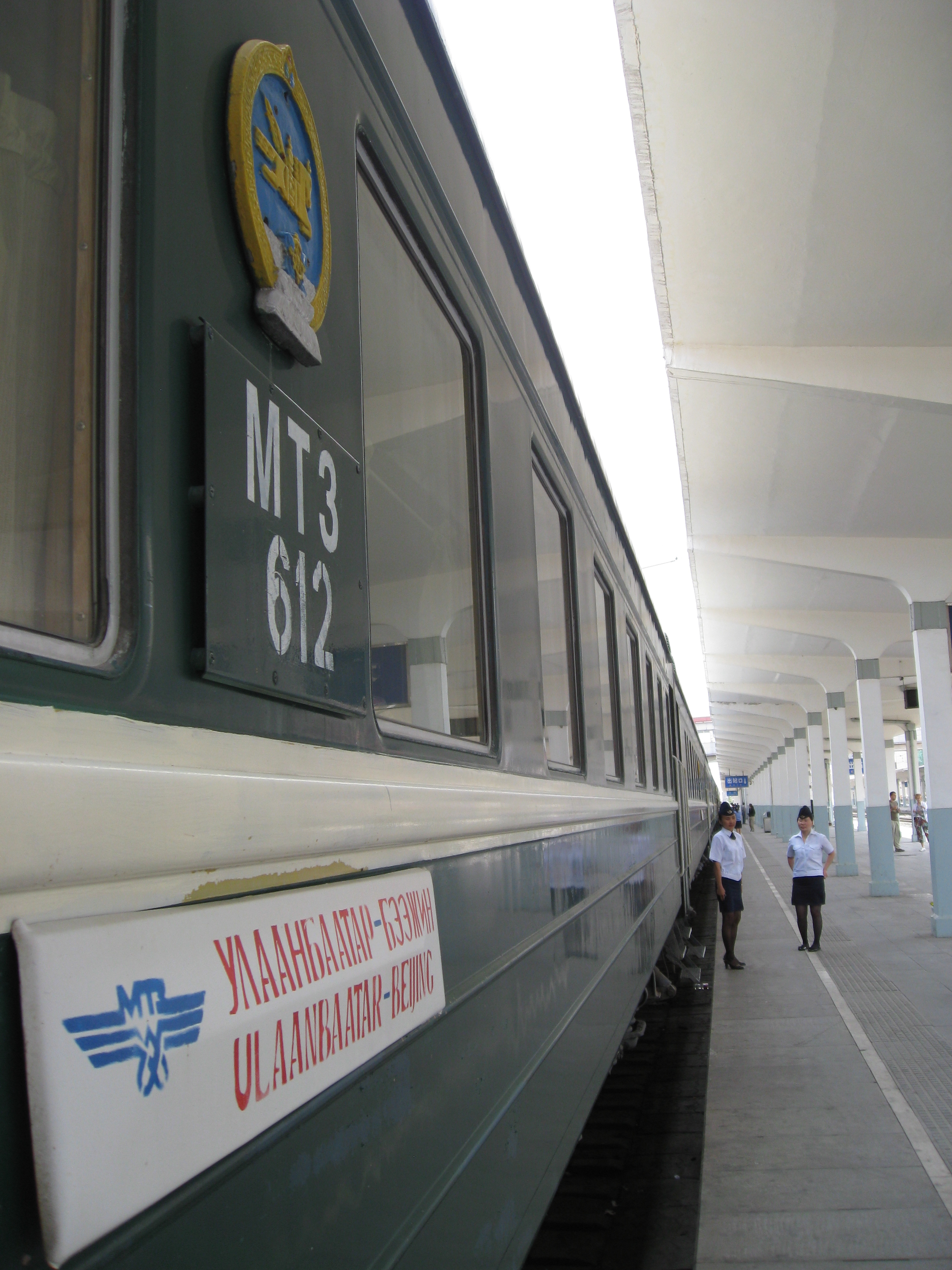
K23/K24 Mongolian train

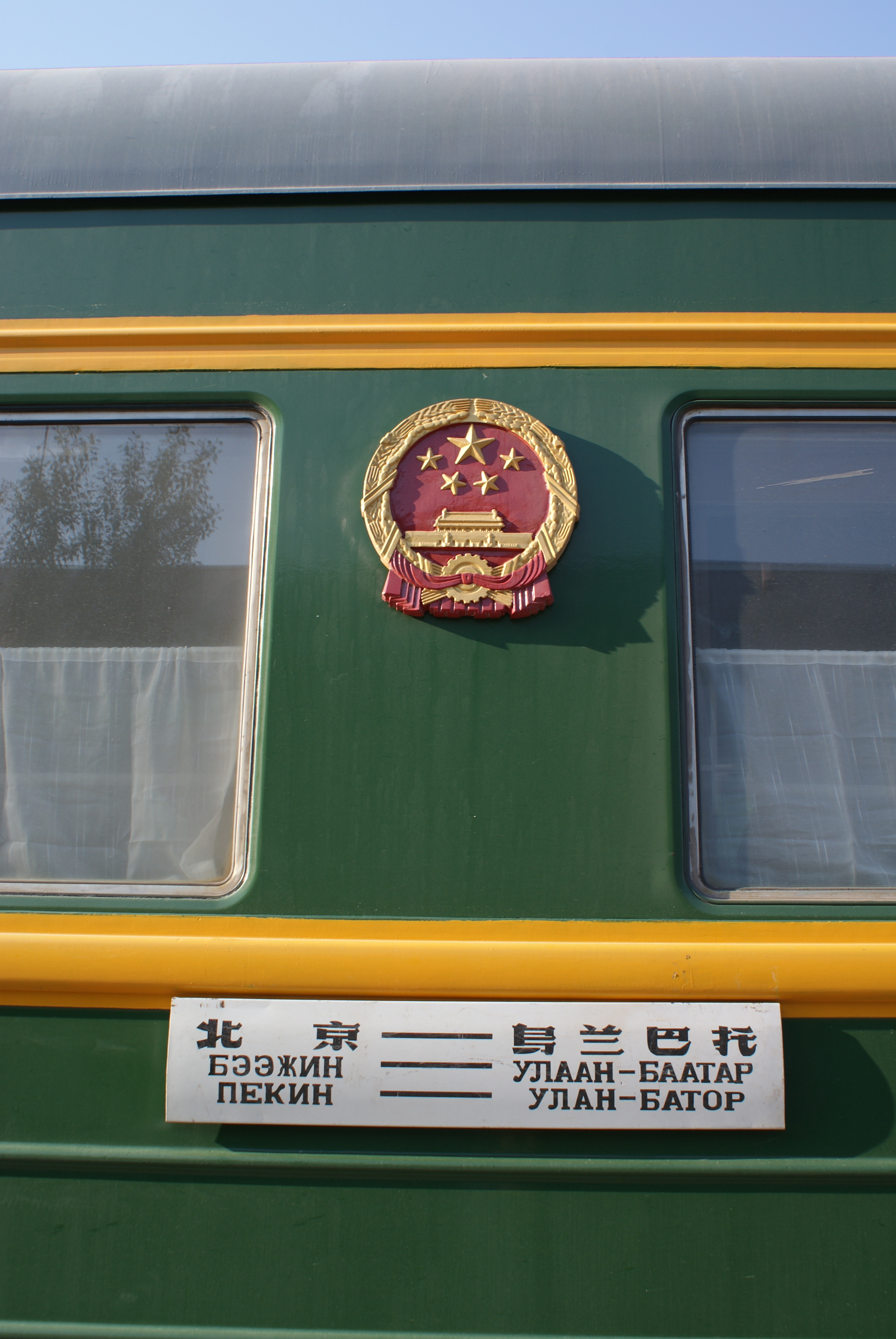
CR train

According to an agreement by China, Mongolia and Soviet Union on 12 December 1955, three countries agreed to laid a section of Russian gauge from Jining to Erenhot and operate trains through the line, thus all trains will change bogies at Jining station. Passenger services commenced on 4 January 1956 with the first departure from Zhengyangmen East Terminus.

On 16 February 1962, additional train for Chinese workers in Mongolia commenced operations by CR. Russian gauge track section laid between Jining and Erenhot was scrapped on 12 October 1965, all bogie changing moved to Erenhot.

From 2 September 1974, the train service is rotated between China and Mongolia. The train number is unified as 89/90 from 15 July 1975.

On 25 March 1985, China and Mongolia agreed to commence train 23/24 and operations shifted between both countries. And train 89/90 is rotated with 23/24 between peak season and non-peak season. UBTZ joined passenger service operations from 5 June 1986.

From October 1994, train 23/24 rescheduled as year-round passenger service, and 89/90 rerouted to domestic train service. Train 23/24 is elevated to K-train (Express) in 2000 during the third speed up campaign. K23/24 is rerouted through Fengtai–Shacheng railway in the sixth speed up campaign in 2007.

From 29 September 2015, all CR Type 18 and Type 19 coaches are replaced by Qingdao Sifang Type 25G coaches without changing composition order, but an air-con generator was added at the back of the locomotive.

Mongolian trains were withdrew from 4 June 2019, thus CR become the sole operator during the period until suspension until COVID-19, which trains suspended from 18 February 2020.

Train service resumed on 3 June 2025 after suspension for five years. The dedicated ticket counter is moved to CITS House in Dongdan.

From 4 June 2026, UBTZ take the rotation shift for the route. Return trip from Beijing departs every Saturday.

== Coaches ==
CR coaches are operated by CR Beijing, the rolling stock is Type 25G international variant. In the Chinese section there will be 18 coaches, with 10 hard sleepers, 3 premium sleepers, and soft sleeper, canteen, luggage and air-con coach 1 each. The CR canteen coach will be removed with 3 hard sleepers at Erenhot and will be joined when return. Thus, from Zamin Üüd to Ulaanbaatar, 1 UBTZ canteen coach and hard sleeper will be attached to the CR train, which there will be 15 coaches in Mongolia.

| Section | Beijing↔Ulaanbaatar | | | | | | | Beijing↔Erenhot | | | Zamin Uud↔Ulaanbaatar | |
| Coach no. | Nil | Nil | 1-3 | 4-6 | 7 | 8 | 9-11 | Nil | 0 | A1-A2 | Nil | 0 |
| CR Coaches | KD25G Air-con power | XL25G Luggage | YW25G Hard Sleeper | RW25G Premium Sleeper | YW25G Hard Sleeper | RW25G Soft Sleeper | YW25G Hard Sleeper | CA25G Canteen | YW25G Hard Sleeper | YW25G Hard Sleeper | МЕСТ; РЕСТОРАН Canteen | МЕСТ-36 36 pax Hard Sleeper |
| Operator | CR Beijing | | | | | | | CR Beijing | | | UBTZ | |

UBTZ coaches used the modified Tangshan Type 25G МЕСТ Russian-styled coaches, in the Mongolian section there will be 16 coaches, with 10 hard sleepers, 3 premium sleepers, canteen, luggage and air-con coaches 1 each. When the train arrives at Zamin Uud, the canteen coach and a hard sleeper coach will be removed, then will be attached with 3 hard sleepers and a canteen coach from Erlian to Beijing, thus there will be 18 coaches in the Chinese section.

| Section | Ulaanbaatar↔Beijing | | | | | Ulaanbaatar↔Zamin Uud | | Erenhot↔Beijing | | |
| Coach no. | 1-4 | 5-7 | 8-12 | Nil | Nil | Nil | 0 | A2-A1 | 0 | Nil |
| UBTZ Coaches | МЕСТ-36 36 Pax Hard sleeper | МЕСТ-20 20 Pax Premium sleeper | МЕСТ-36 36 Pax Hard sleeper | МЕСТ; БАГАЖНЫИ Luggage | МЕСТ-02 2 Pax Air-con | МЕСТ-40 40 Pax РЕСТОРАН Canteen | МЕСТ-36 36 Pax Hard sleeper | YW18 Hard sleeper | YW18 Hard sleeper | CA18 Canteen |
| Operator | UBTZ | | | | | UBTZ | | CR Beijing | | |

Due to gauge differences, all trains must change bogies at Erenhot station, and with time for immigration process included, the wait time in Erenhot will be 5 hours.

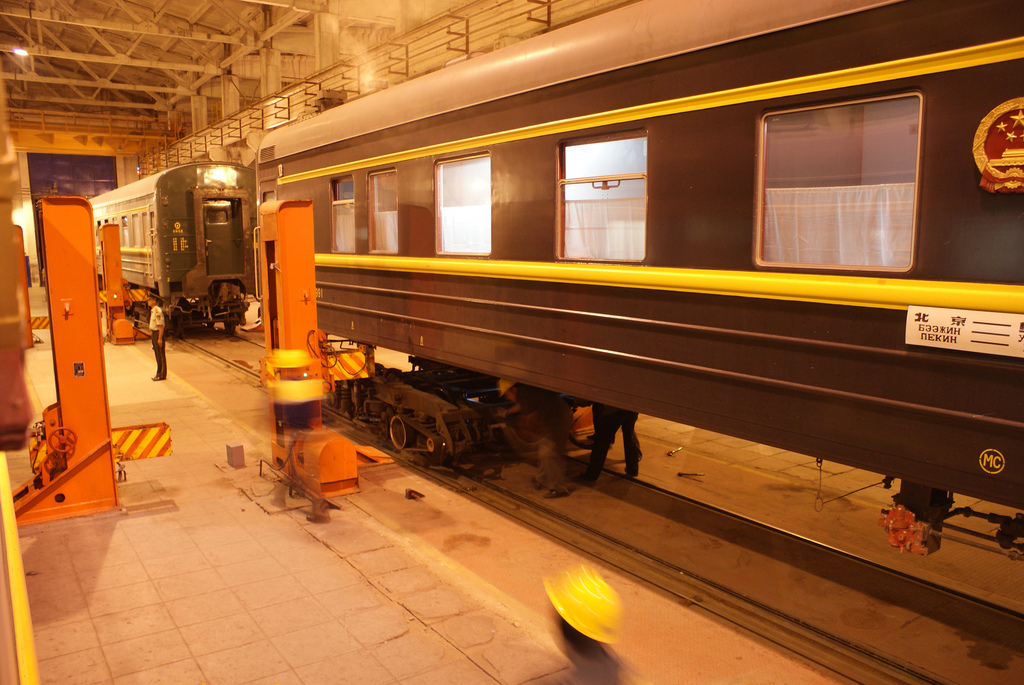
K23/24 change bogies at Erenhot

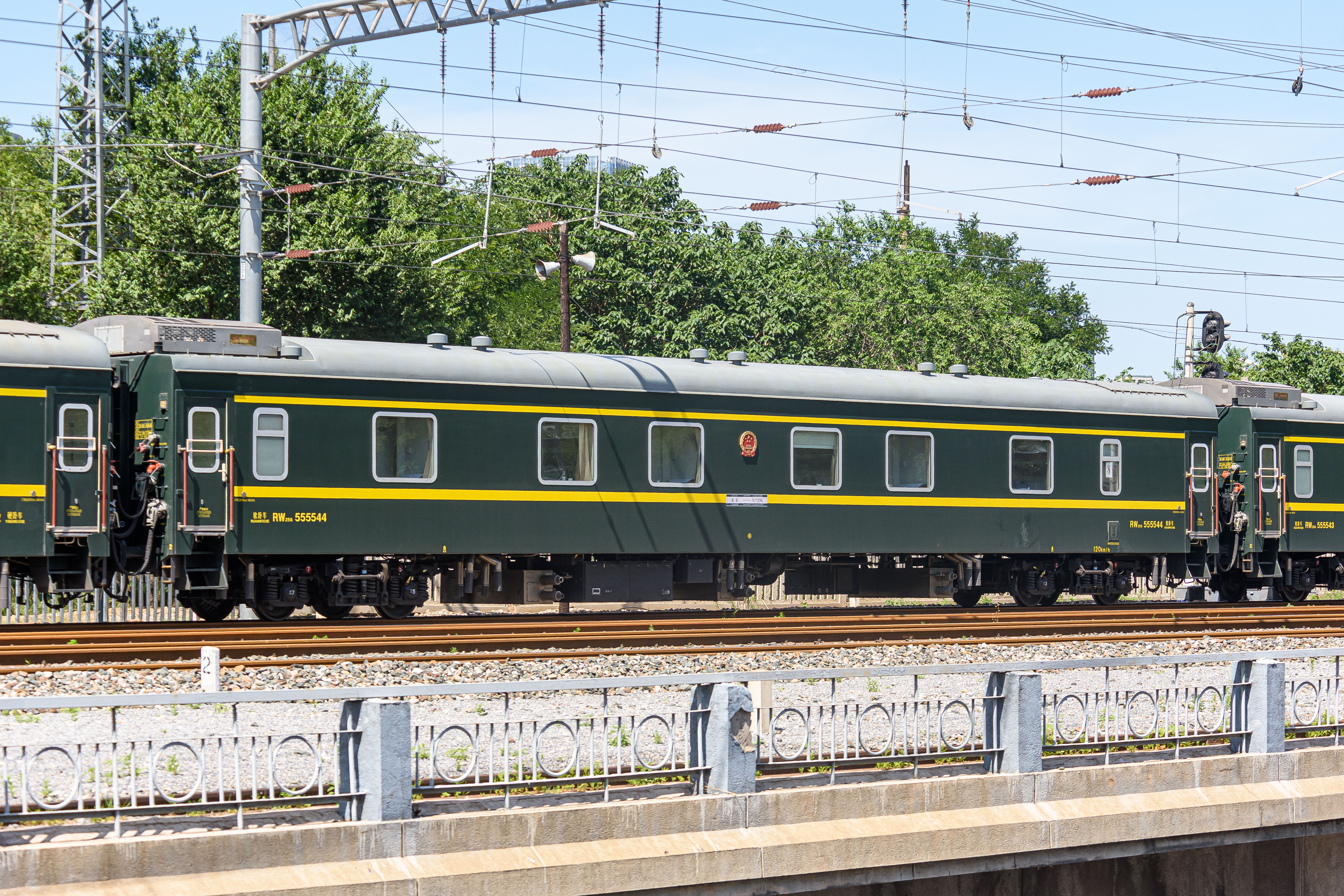
CR Premium sleeper coach attached to K24

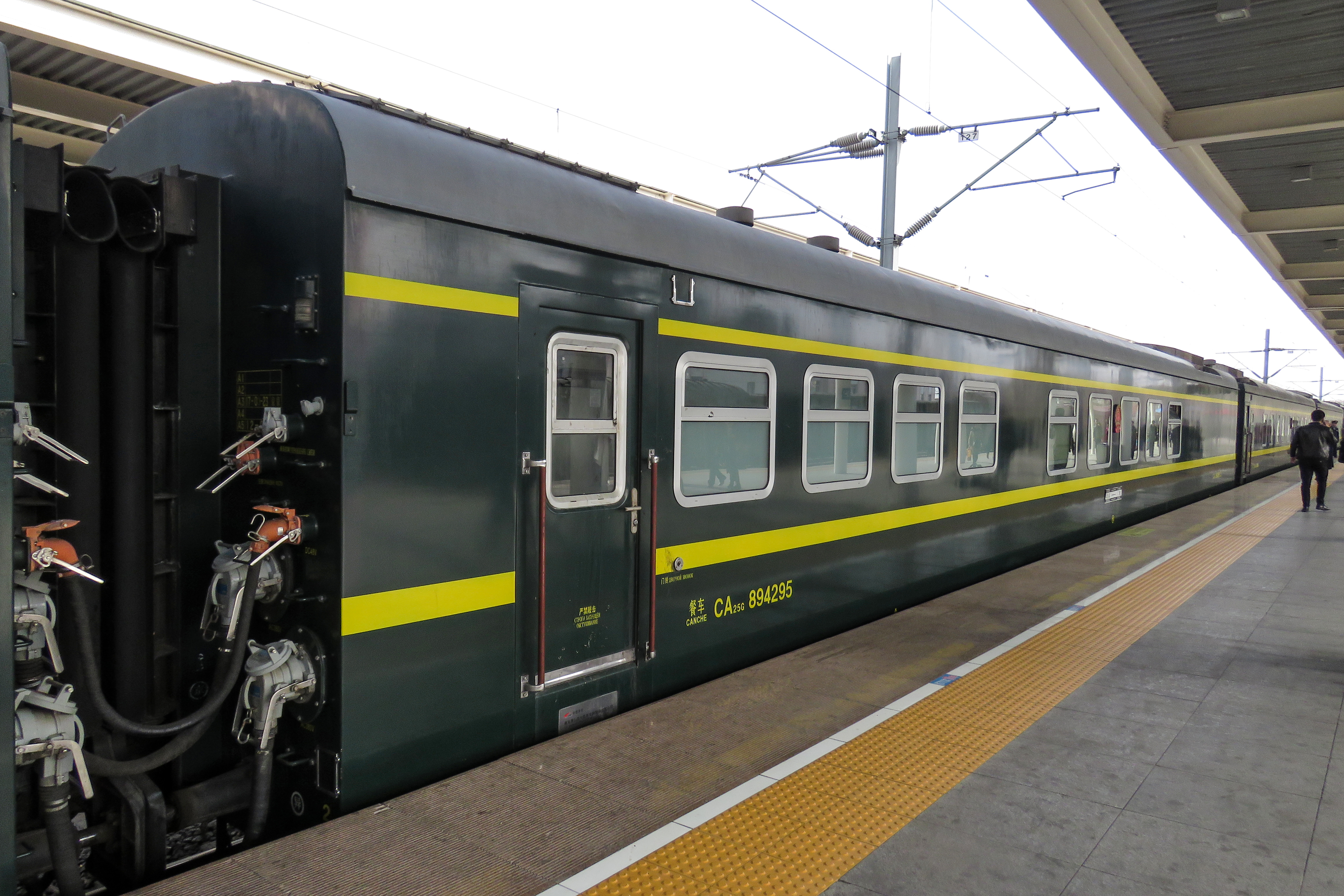
CR Canteen coach attached to K23 at Jining South station

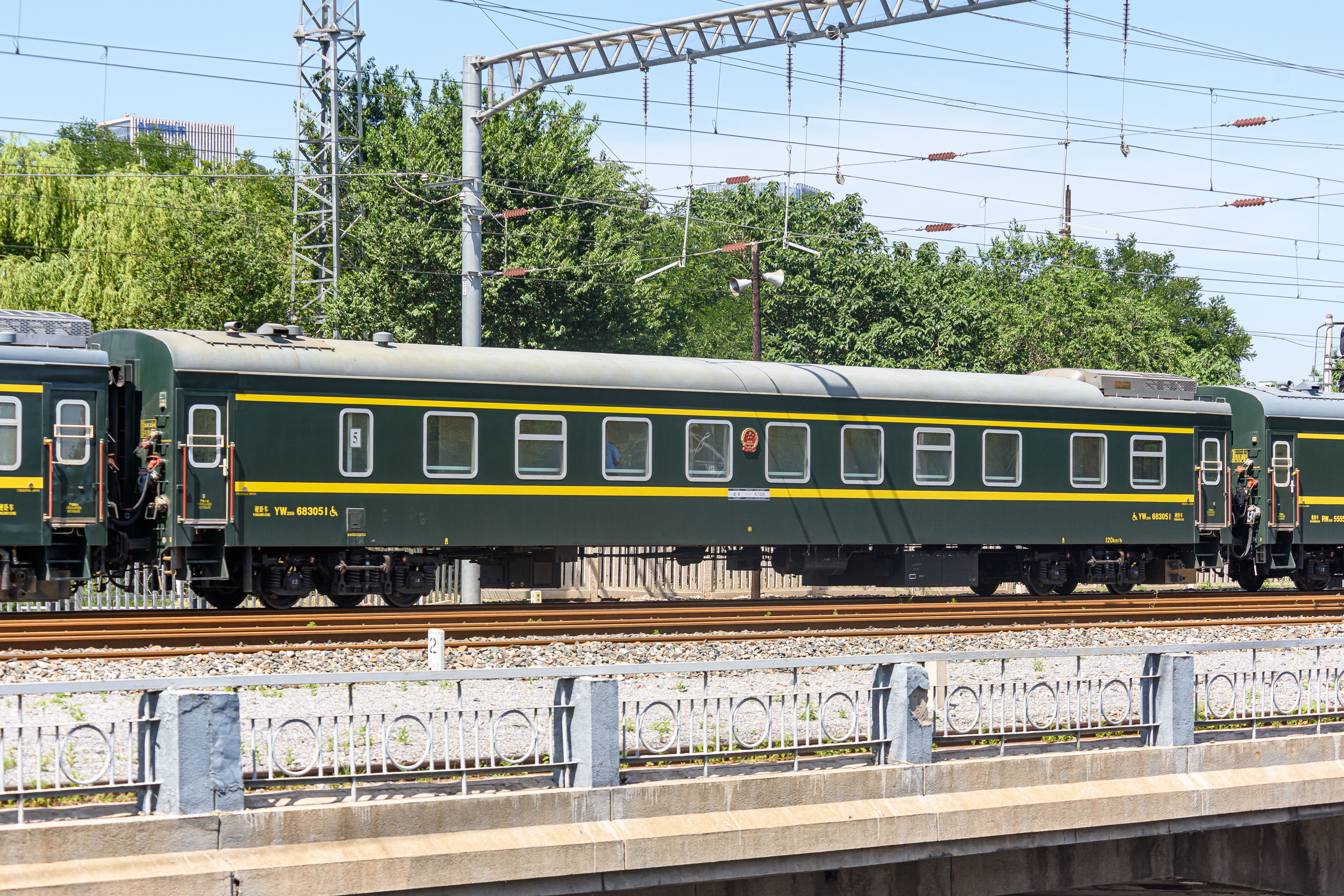
CR Accessible Hard sleeper coach attached to K24

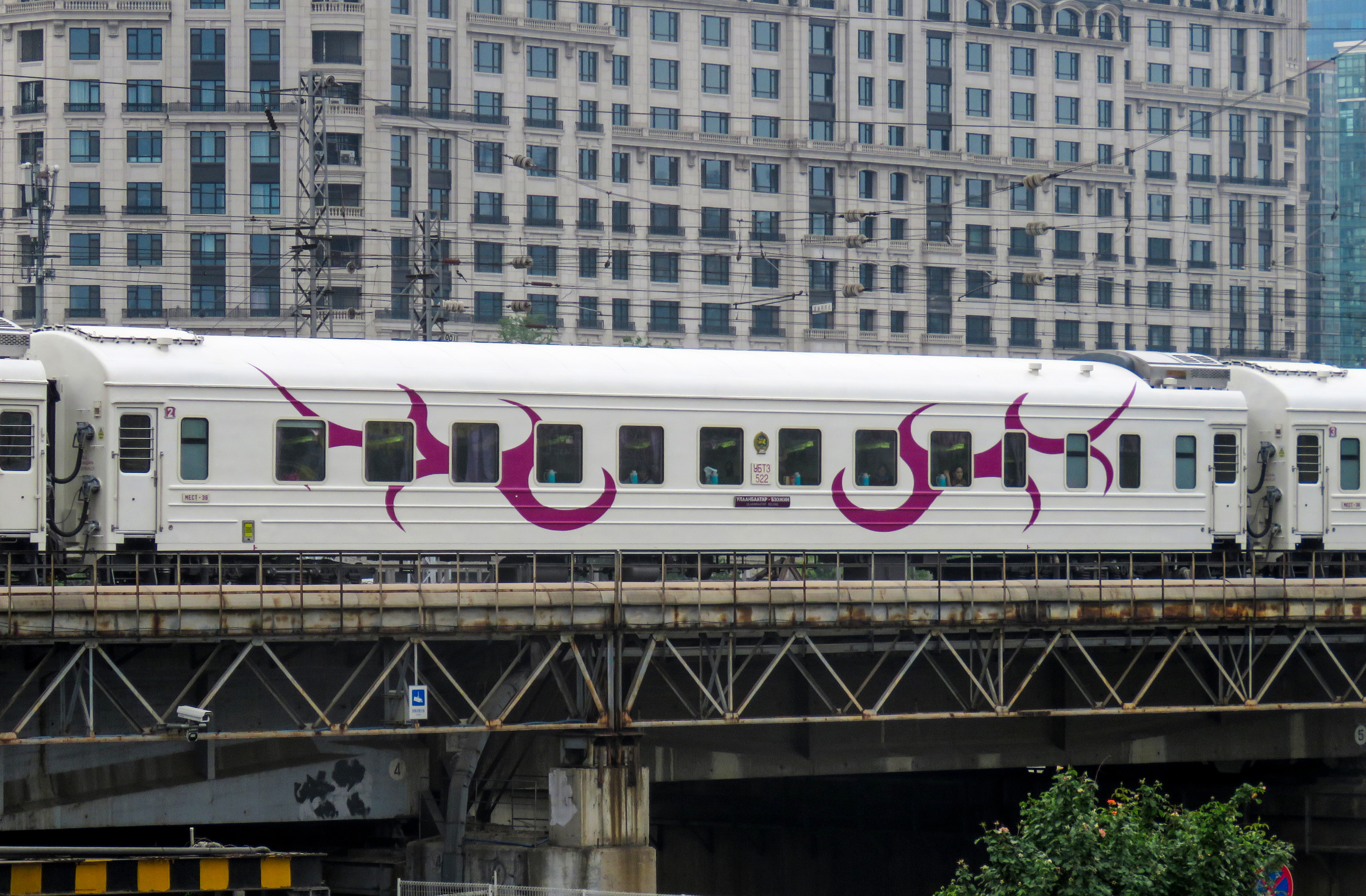
UBTZ hard sleeper coach attached to K24 arriving at Beijing Station

== Locomotive ==
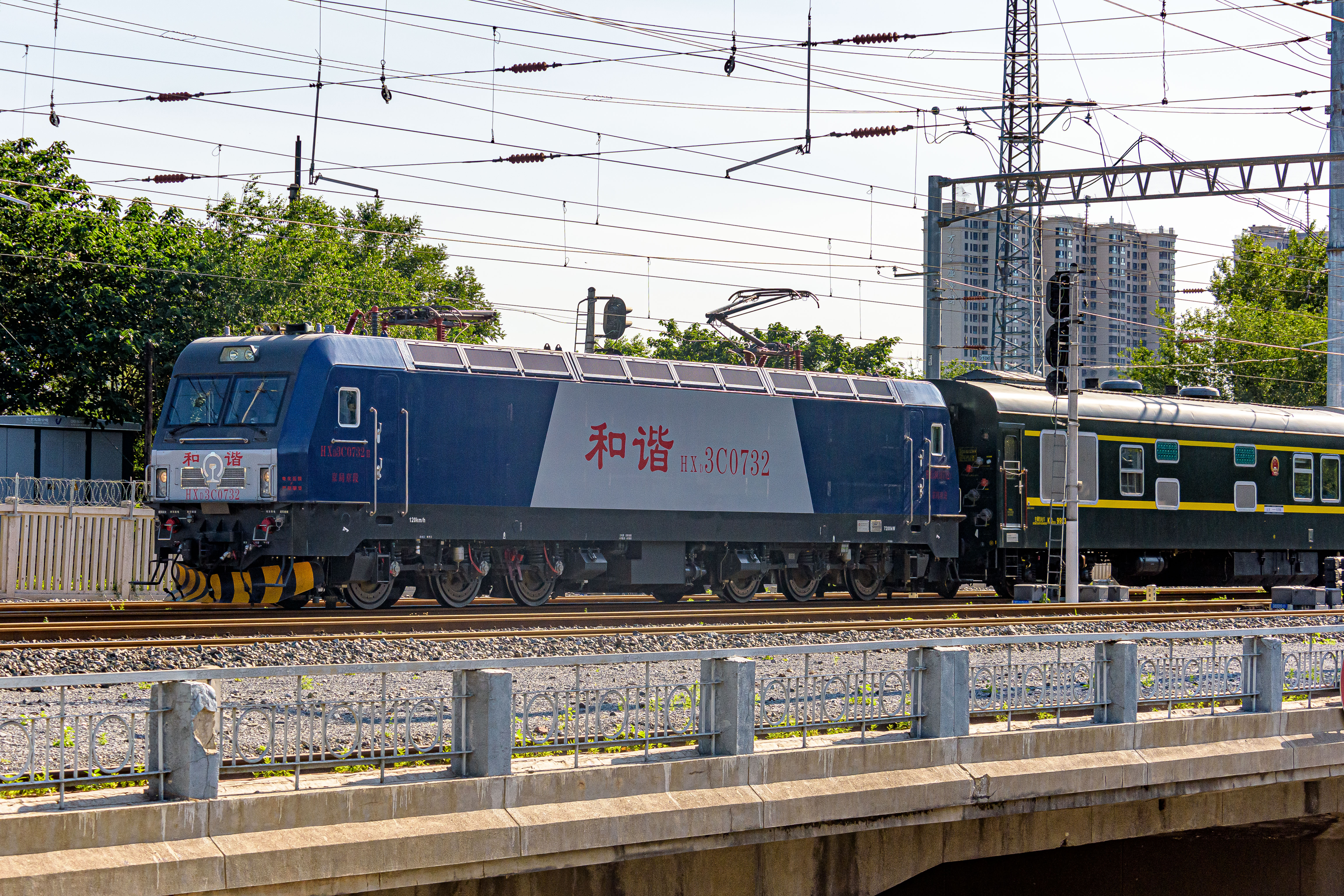
HXD3C loco pulls the resumed K23 train from Beijing Station（3 June 2025）

K23/24 is hauled by a CR Beijing HXD3C electric loco from Beijing to Jining South, with the driver shift at Datong station, then will be hauled by a CR Hohhot DF4D diesel loco to Erenhot. After clearing immigration at Erenhot, the UBTZ CKD4B diesel loco to Zamin Üüd and will change to 2M62MM or 2TE116 diesel local to Ulaanbaatar.

| Section | Beijing ↔ Jining South | Jining South ↔ Erenhot | Erenhot ↔ Zamin Uud | Zamin Uud ↔ Ulaanbaatar |
| Loco Operator Driver shift | HXD3C CR Beijing Shift at Datong | DF4D CR Hohhot | CKD4B UBTZ | 2M62MM/ 2TE116UM UBTZ |

== Schedule ==
- No time difference between China and Mongolia, statistics up to 1 July 2025.

=== Current schedule ===
| K23/023 | | | | Stops | 024/K24 | | | |
| Train no. | Day | Arrival | Departure | Stops | Arrival | Departure | Day | Train no. |
|---|---|---|---|---|---|---|---|---|
| K23 | Day 1 | — | 07:27 | Beijing | 14:35 | — | Day 2 | K24 |
| K23 | Day 1 | 10:58 | 11:04 | Zhangjiakou | 11:01 | 11:07 | Day 2 | K24 |
| K23 | Day 1 | 15:27 | 15:43 | Jining South | 06:37 | 06:55 | Day 2 | K24 |
| K23 | Day 1 | 18:03 | 18:05 | Zhurihe | 04:07 | 04:09 | Day 2 | K24 |
| K23/023 | Day 1 | 20:18 | 00:59 | Erenhot | 21:00 | 02:00 | Day 1 | 024/K24 |
↑ China（UTC+08:00）Mongolia ↓
| 023 | Day 2 | 01:25 | 02:40 | Zamin Üüd | 18:50 | 20:35 | Day 1 | 024 |
| 023 | Day 2 | 06:15 | 06:50 | Sain-shand | 14:48 | 15:19 | Day 1 | 024 |
| 023 | Day 2 | 10:13 | 10:30 | Choir | 11:16 | 11:31 | Day 1 | 024 |
| 023 | Day 2 | 14:35 | — | Ulaanbaatar | — | 07:18 | Day 1 | 024 |

== Incidents ==
On 3 January 2009, a Mongolian operated K23 train's air-con coach caught fire near Baoziwan Station, Shanxi. Later, the train obtained a replacement air-con coach from another train to continue its journey to Ulaanbaatar.

== See also ==
- China Railway K3/4
- Visa policy of Mongolia
- Ulaanbaatar Railway
