= China Railways HXD3C =

Class of Chinese electric locomotives

HXD3C 和谐3C型电力机车
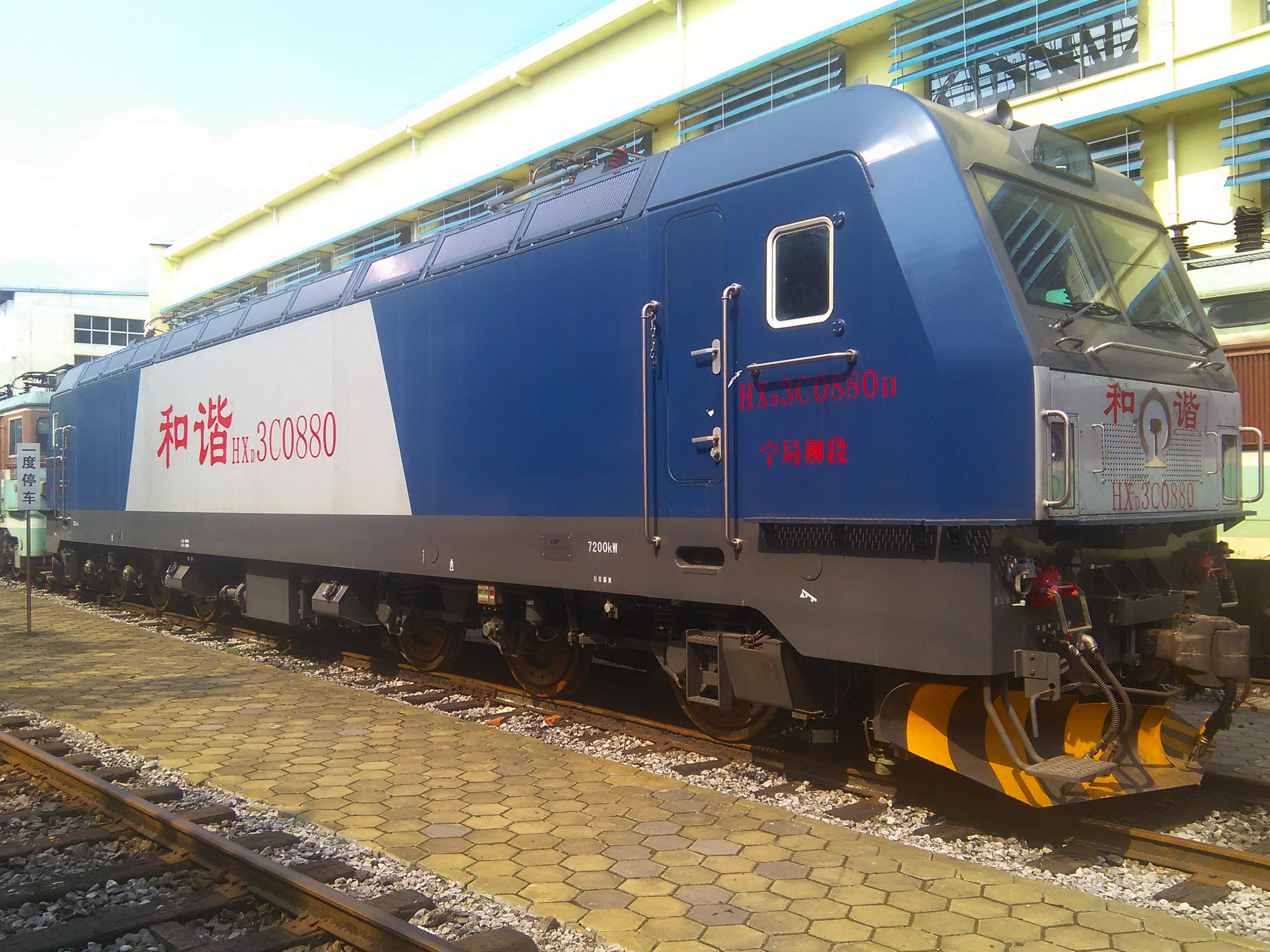
- HXD3C-0880 at Liuzhou Locomotive Depot. The Locomotive was damaged in an accident which happened in Hengyang-Liuzhou Railway in 2014.
Type and origin
- Power type: Electric
- Designer: CNR Dalian
- Builder: CNR Dalian, CNR Beijing Feb. 7th
- Build date: 2010-present
- Total produced: >2000 (including HXD3CA)
Specifications
- Configuration
  - UIC: Co′Co′
- Gauge: 1,435 mm (4 ft 8 1/2 in)
- Axle load: 23 t (22.6 long tons; 25.4 short tons) / 25 t (24.6 long tons; 27.6 short tons)
- Loco weight: 138 t (136 long tons; 152 short tons) / 150 t (150 long tons; 170 short tons)
- Electric system/s: 25 kV 50 Hz AC Catenary
- Current pickup: Pantograph
- Transmission: Voith SET-553
Performance figures
- Maximum speed: 132 km/h (82 mph) (Test); 120 km/h (75 mph) (Service)
- Power output: 7,200 kW (9,700 hp)
- Tractive effort: 520 kN (120,000 lb_{f}) / 570 kN (130,000 lb_{f}) (starting); 370 kN (83,000 lb_{f}) (continuous) @ 70 km/h (43 mph); 370 kN (83,000 lb_{f}) (braking) from 70 km/h (43 mph) to 10 km/h (6.2 mph)
Career
- Locale: People's Republic of China

The HXD3C (Chinese: 和谐3C型电力机车) is an electric locomotive built in Mainland China by CNR Dalian Locomotives. It is also the first 6-axle dual-service AC electric locomotive in China. It has functions of DC600V train power supply (except HXD3CA) and dual pipe air supply.

== Gallery ==
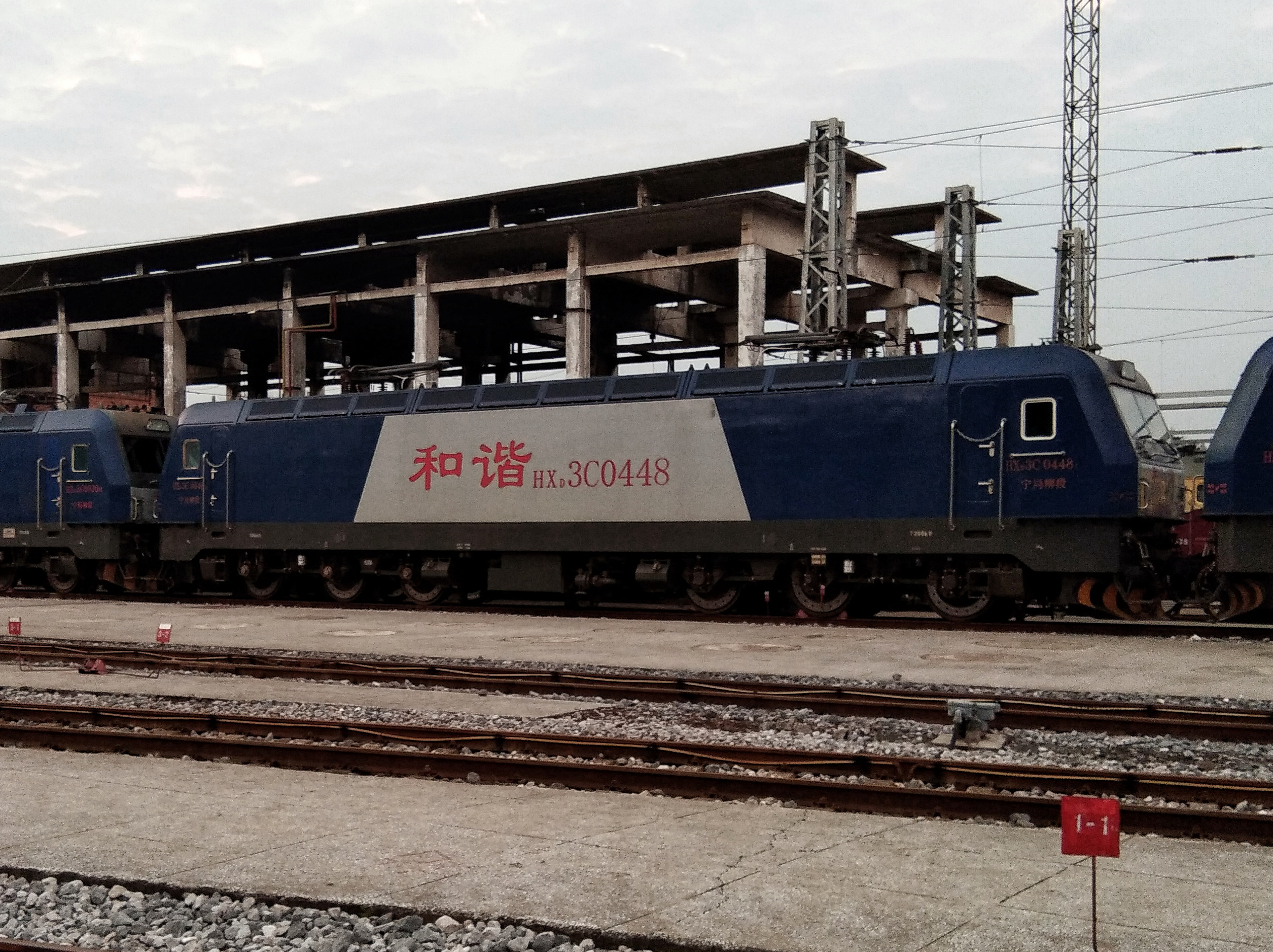
HXD3C-0448 at Guilin Locomotive Area. The Locomotive is the first HXD3C Electric Locomotive made by CRRC Beijing Locomotive Co., Ltd.

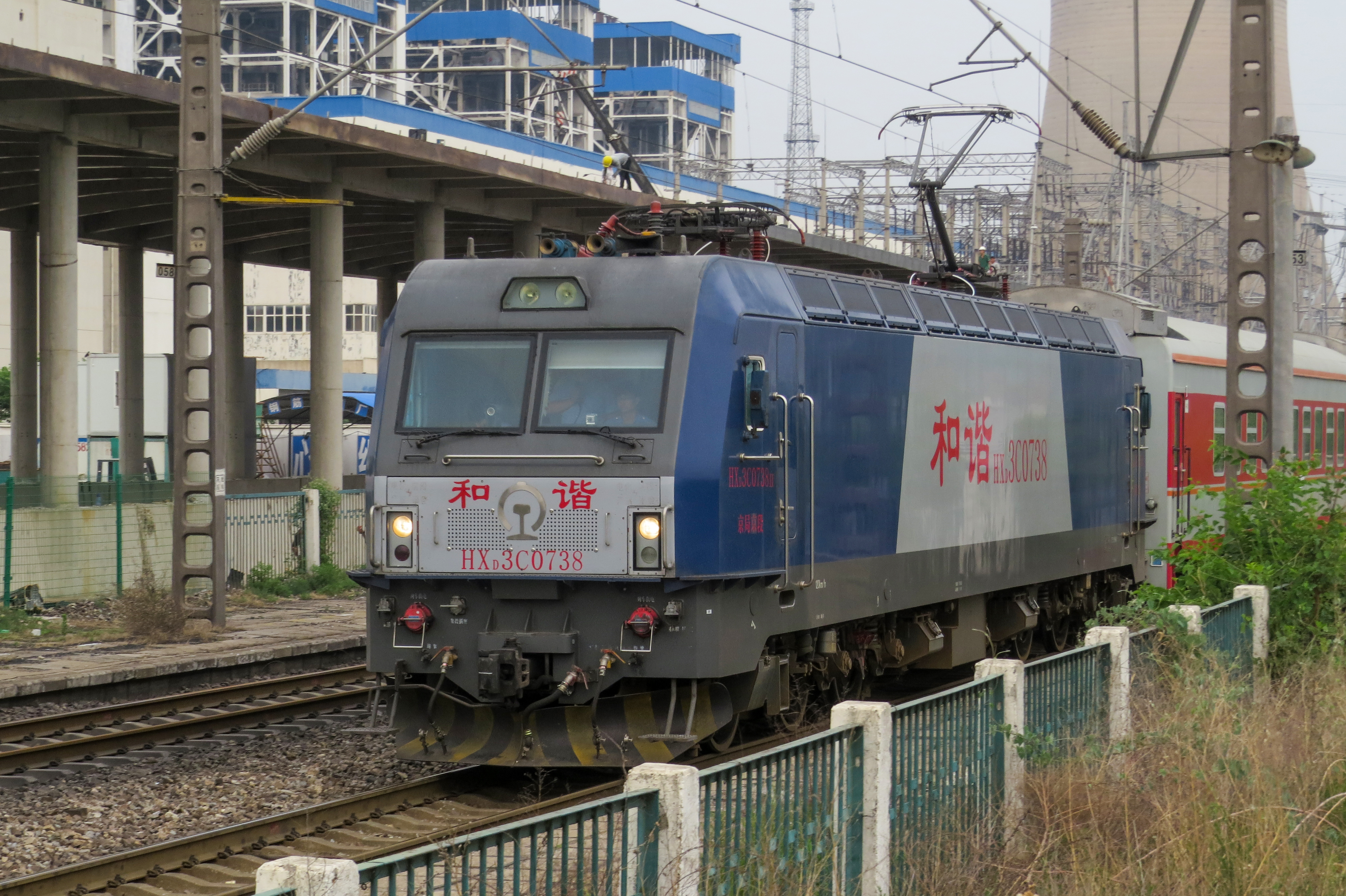
HXD3C-0738 at Yangsan Railway Station, Beijing, June 2017.

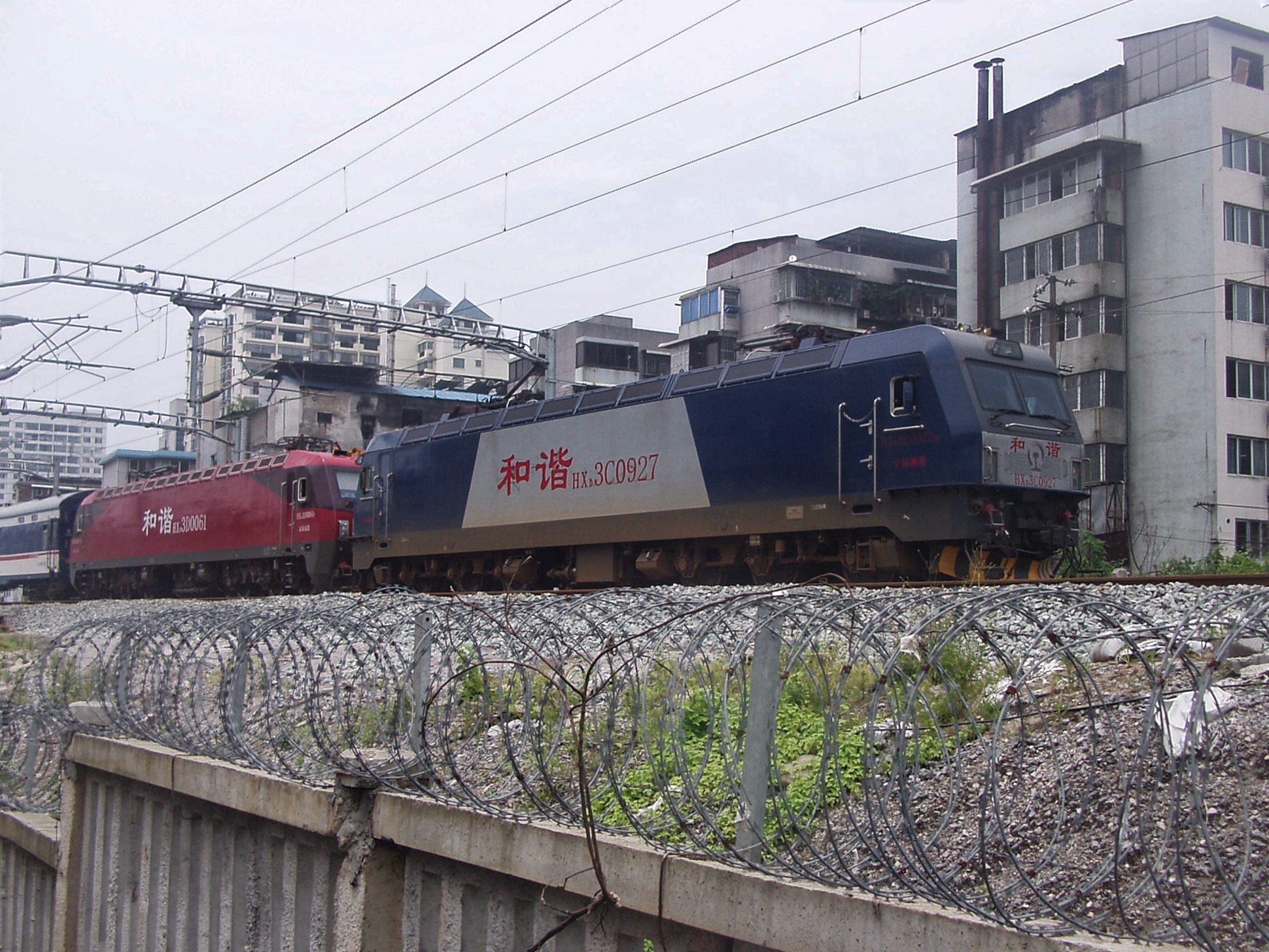
HXD3C-0927 is tracted Beijing-Nanning-Hanoi Through Train with HXD3D-0061 in Guilin.

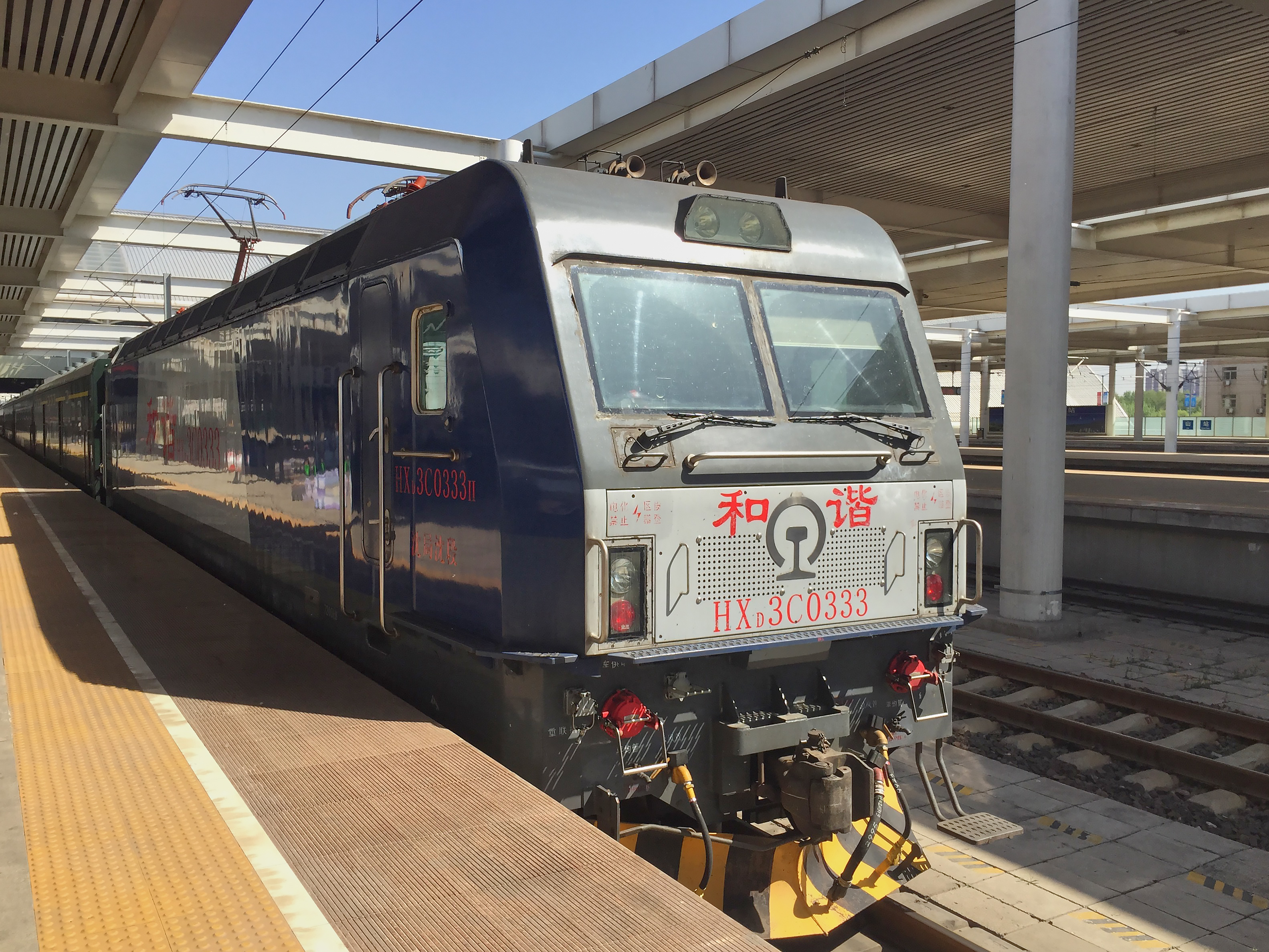
HXD3C-0333 at Tangshan Railway Station.

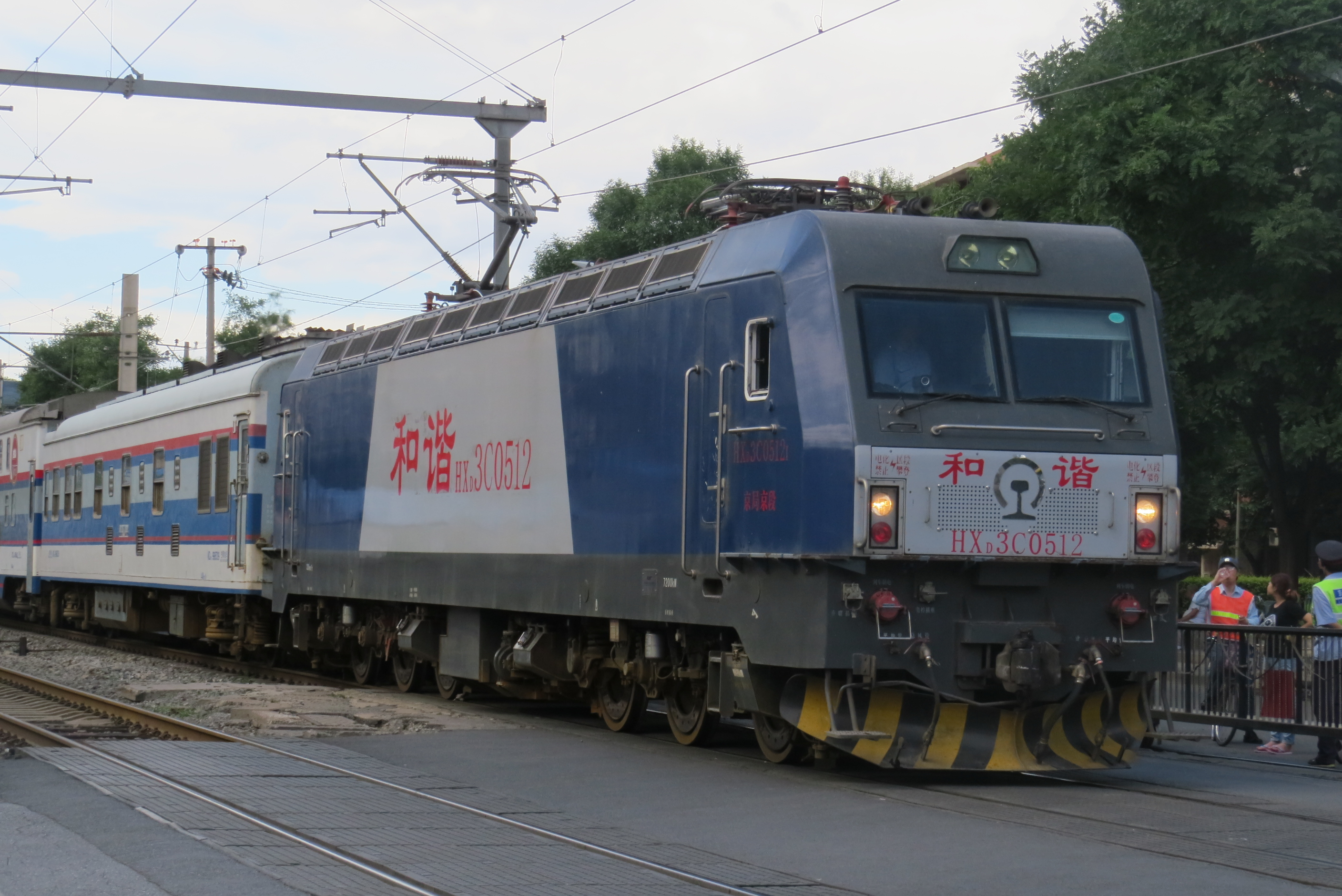
HXD3C-0512 at Nongfusuo Level Crossing, Beijing.

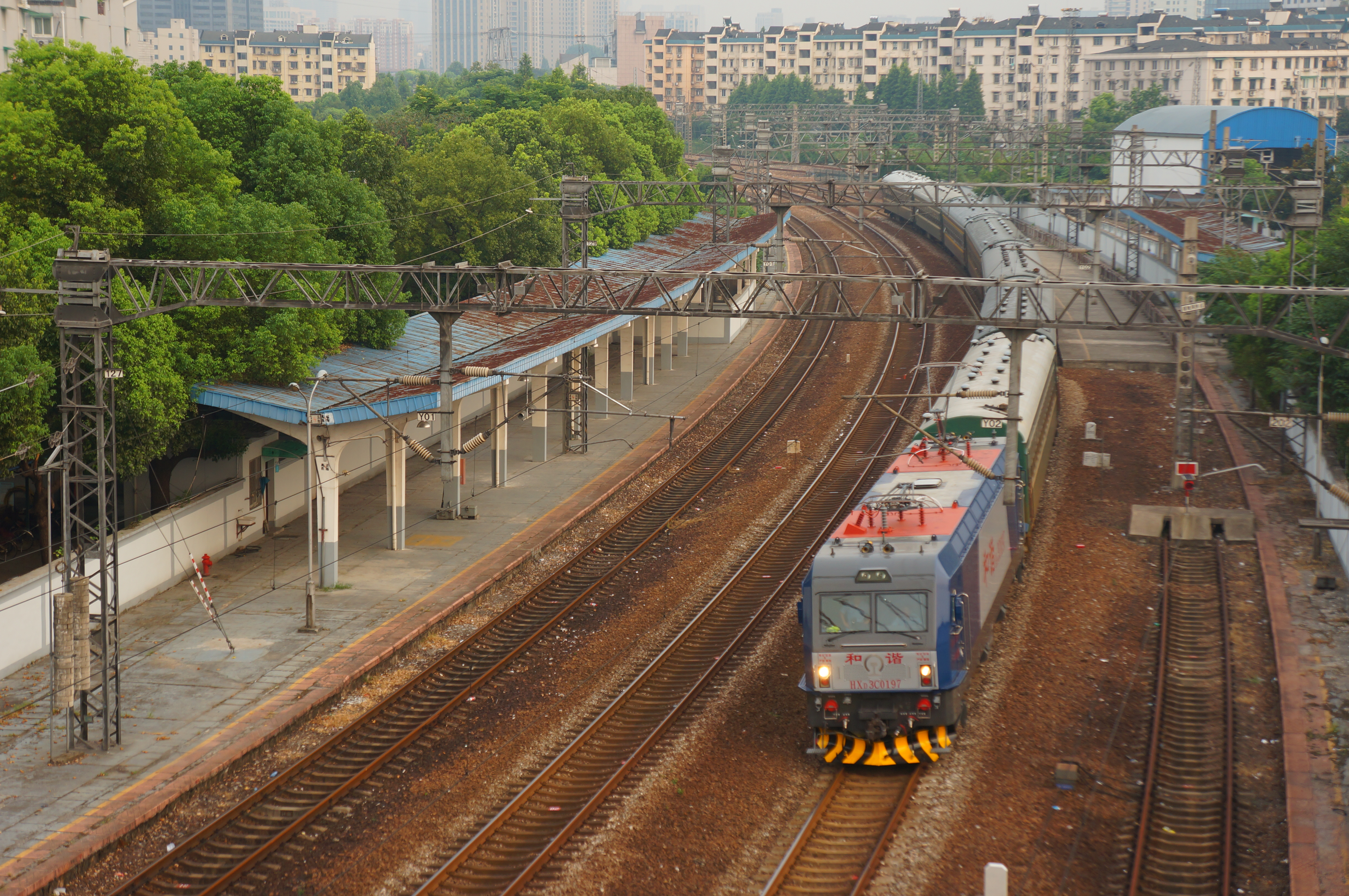
HXD3C-0197 at Genshanmen Railway Station

== See also ==
- China Railways HXD3
- China Railways HXD3A
- China Railways HXD3B
- China Railways HXD3D
- China Railways HXD3E
