= Tomsk–Tayga railway line =

Railway line in Russia

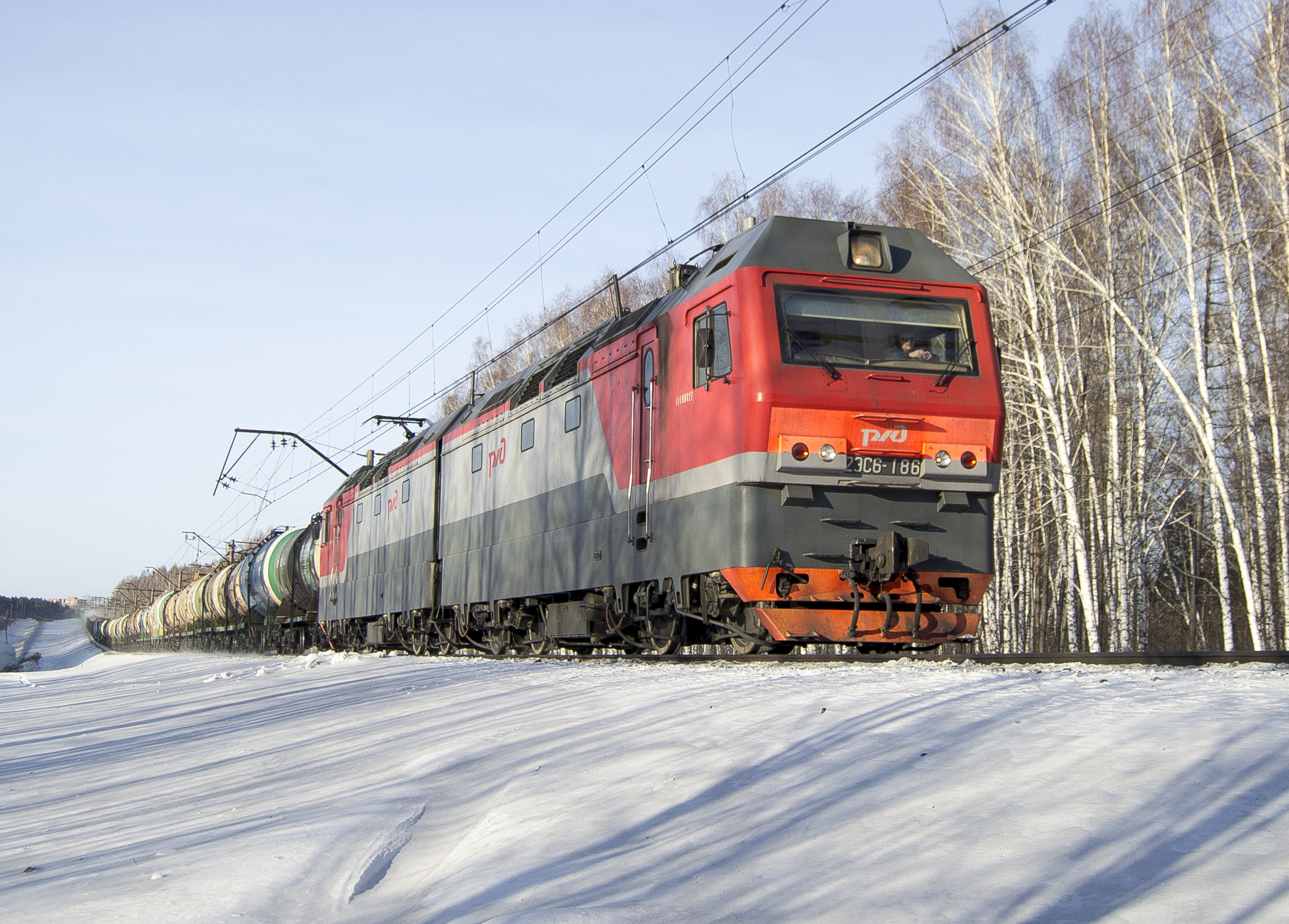
Freight train in Tomsk

The Tomsk–Tayga railway line is the railway branch connecting the Trans-Siberian Railway with Tomsk.

== Main information ==
The line is a single track throughout. Construction started in summer 1895 and completed in the end of 1896. Had at that time a length of 89 miles (95 kilometers). The need for the branches associated with the decision to build the Trans-Siberian Railway to bypass Tomsk, which was adopted in 1893.

The beginning of the branches was a 213-mile (227-th kilometer or about) the Medium-Siberian railway from nameless settlement of the Trans-Siberian Railway. Later the station became known as Tomsk–Tayga, and later Tayga. Now it is 3565-th kilometer of the Trans-Siberian Railway, on which is situated the town of Tayga, Kemerovo Oblast. The first 20 miles from the Tayga line runs along the watershed of the Katata/Cherbak (tributaries Yai) and Togakushi/Vasandani (tributaries Tom River), and then Vasandani and Ushaika Rivers. Station "Tomsk" was located on the 82 mile (87 km), to him from Vela Irkutsk road. The endpoint of the branch was on the Bank of Tom river at the Marina, Ceremonii.

== Second track ==
The need for the construction of the second track was first officially recognized in 1993 after the accident at the Siberian chemical combine. Then, the Russian Government has allocated 10 billion Rubles for the completion of the liquidation of the accident consequences. The Governor of Tomsk Oblast Victor Kress has disposed to spend the money including the construction of a second track between Tomsk-2 and Tayga (87 km). In 1994 has been allocated 200 million Rubles, which were intended Corporation "Transstroy". However, the second tracks were not laid anywhere. Only between stations Tomsk-2 and Tomsk-1 was made mound and delivered the pillars under the electrification of the second track.
