= Omsk railway station =

Railway station in Omsk, Russia

Omsk Омск
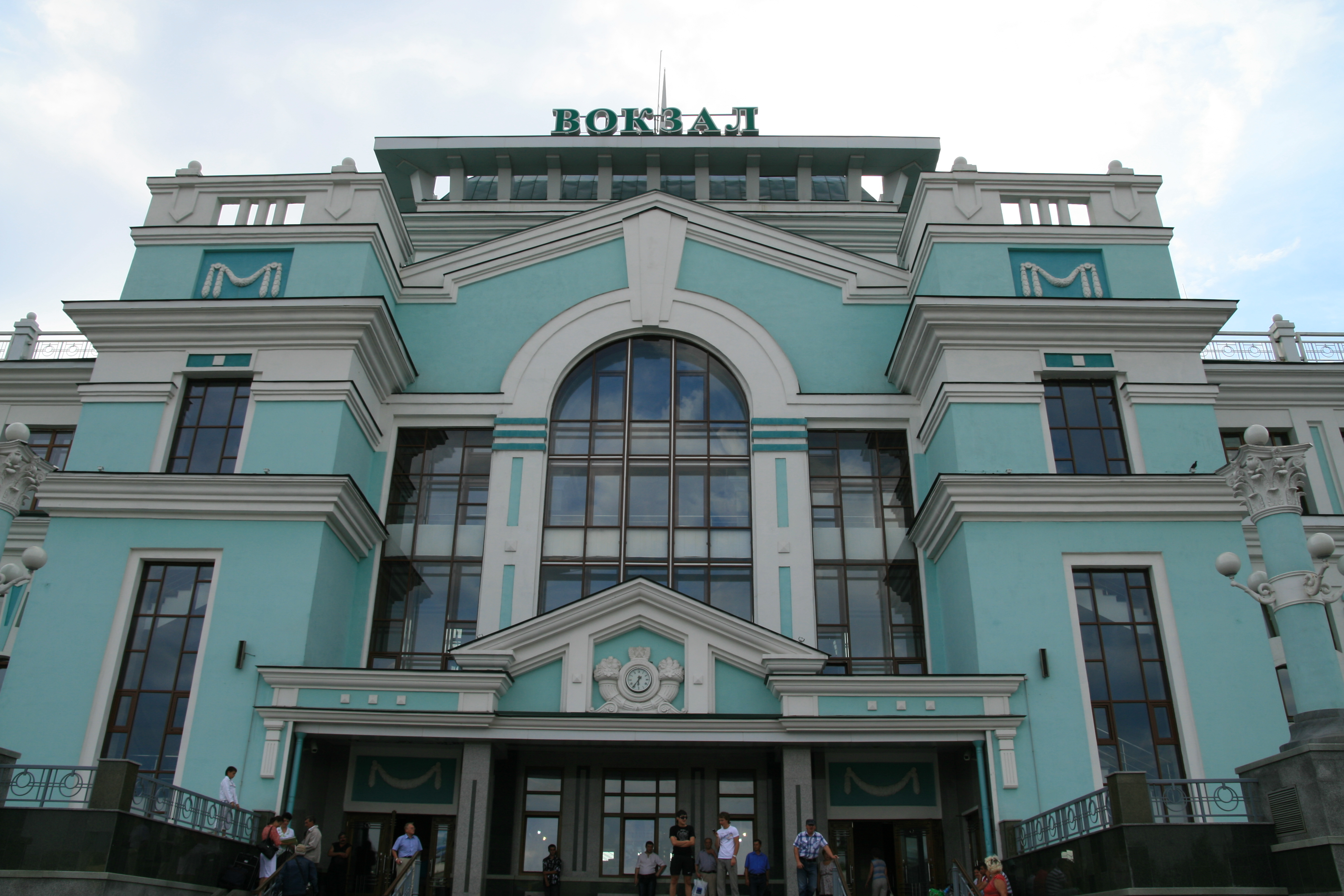
- Omsk railway station

General information
- Location: Russia, Omsk
- Coordinates: 54°55′33.63″N 73°24′2.48″E
- System: West Siberian Railway terminal
- Owner: Russian Railways
- Platforms: 4
- Tracks: 40

Construction
- Parking: yes

Other information
- Station code: 830709
- Fare zone: 0

History
- Opened: 1896

Services
Preceding station	West Siberian Railway	Following station
Location

Omsk–Passazhirsky is the primary passenger railway station for the city of Omsk in Russia, and an important stop along the Trans-Siberian Railway.

== Trains ==
=== Major Domestic ===
- Moscow — Vladivostok
- Chelyabinsk — Omsk
- Omsk — Novosibirsk
- Moscow — Khabarovsk
- Moscow — Barnaul
- Moscow — Ulan Ude
- Adler — Irkutsk
- Adler — Chita

=== International ===
Train number	Train name	Destination	Operated by
001М/002Щ	Rossiya; Россия	(Russia) Moscow (Yaroslavsky) (Russia) Vladivostok (cars: (North Korea) Pyongyang, (North Korea) Tumangang)	(Russia) Russian Railways
003З/004З		(Russia) Moscow (Yaroslavsky) (China) Beijing (Main); Runs through Mongolia	China Railway
005Щ/006Щ		(Russia) Moscow (Yaroslavsky) (Mongolia) Ulaanbaatar (cars: (Mongolia) Erdenet)	(Russia) Russian Railways (Mongolia) Ulaanbataar Railway
019Ч/020Щ	Vostok; Восток	(Russia) Moscow (Yaroslavsky) (China) Beijing (Main)	(Russia) Russian Railways
059Н/059С		(Russia) Kislovodsk (Russia) Novokuznetsk; Runs through Kazakhstan	(Russia) Russian Railways
063Б/064Б		(Belarus) Minsk (cars: (Belarus) Brest) (Russia) Novosibirsk	(Belarus) Belarusian Railways
123Н/124В		(Russia) Belgorod (Russia) Novosibirsk; Runs through Kazakhstan	(Russia) Russian Railways
133Н/133С		(Russia) Anapa (Russia) Tomsk; Runs through Kazakhstan	(Russia) Russian Railways
211Н		(Russia) Chelyabinsk; Runs through Kazakhstan	(Russia) Russian Railways

== Gallery ==
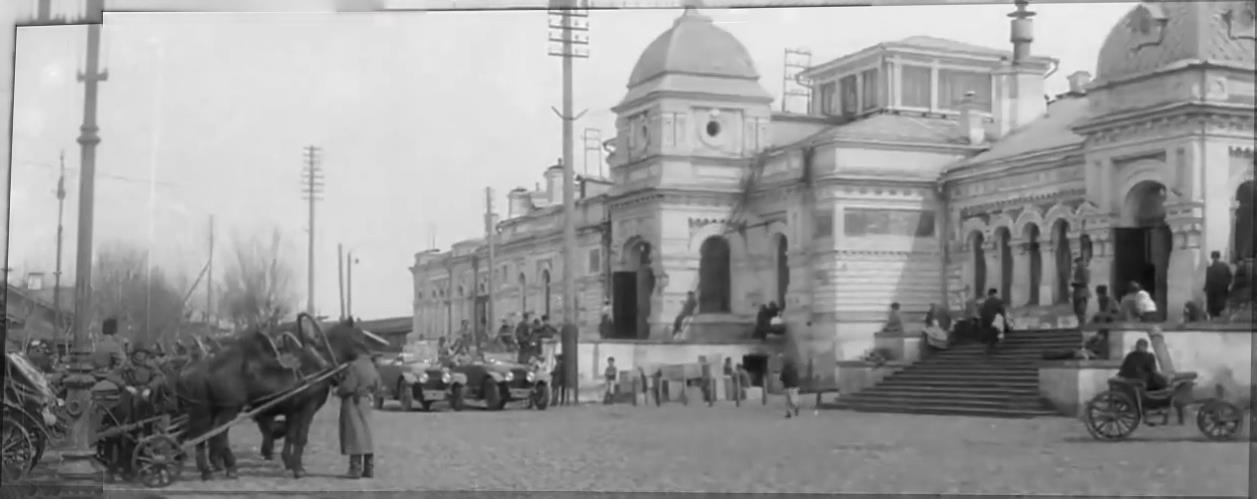
Omsk railway station in 1919

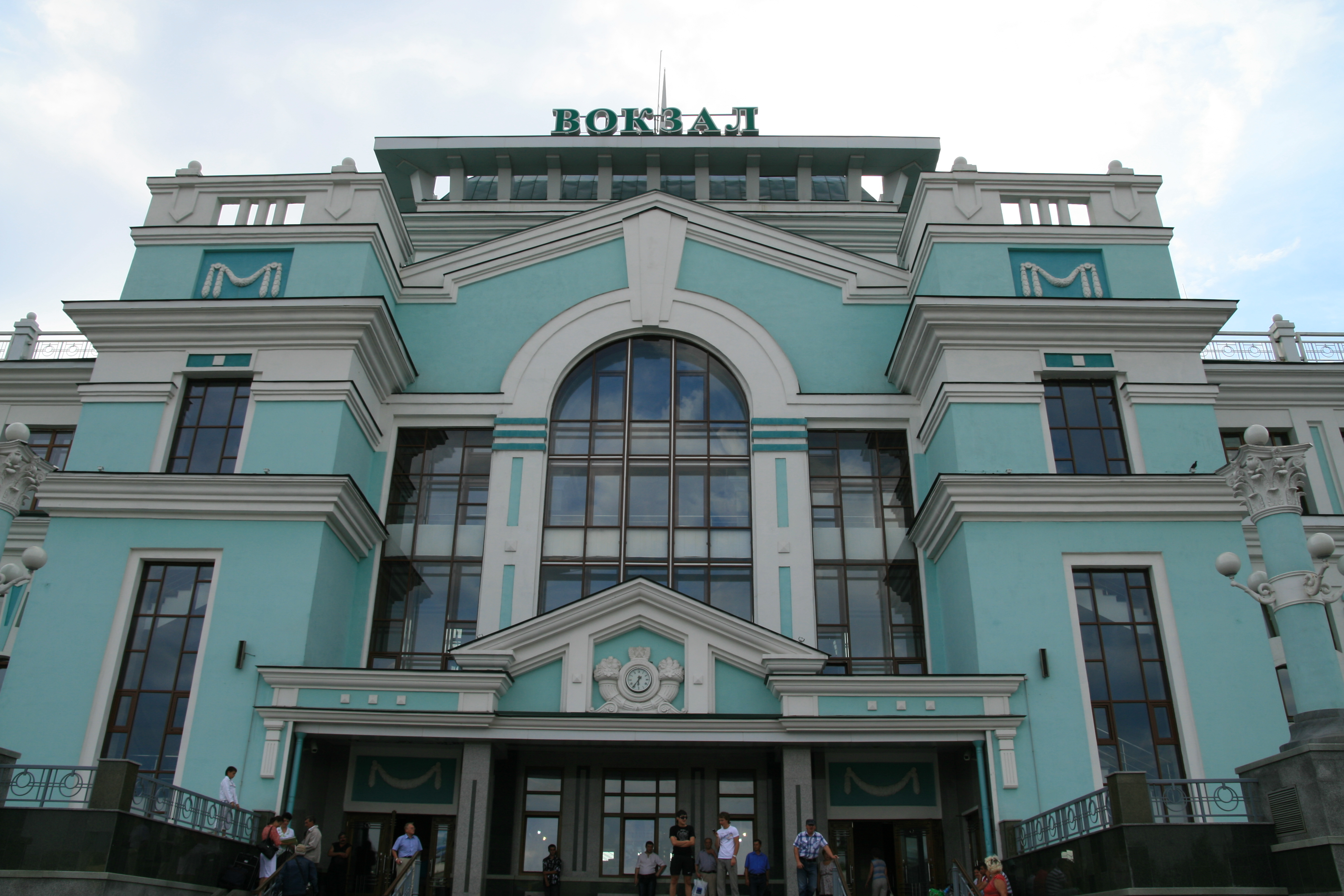
Omsk railway station in 2008

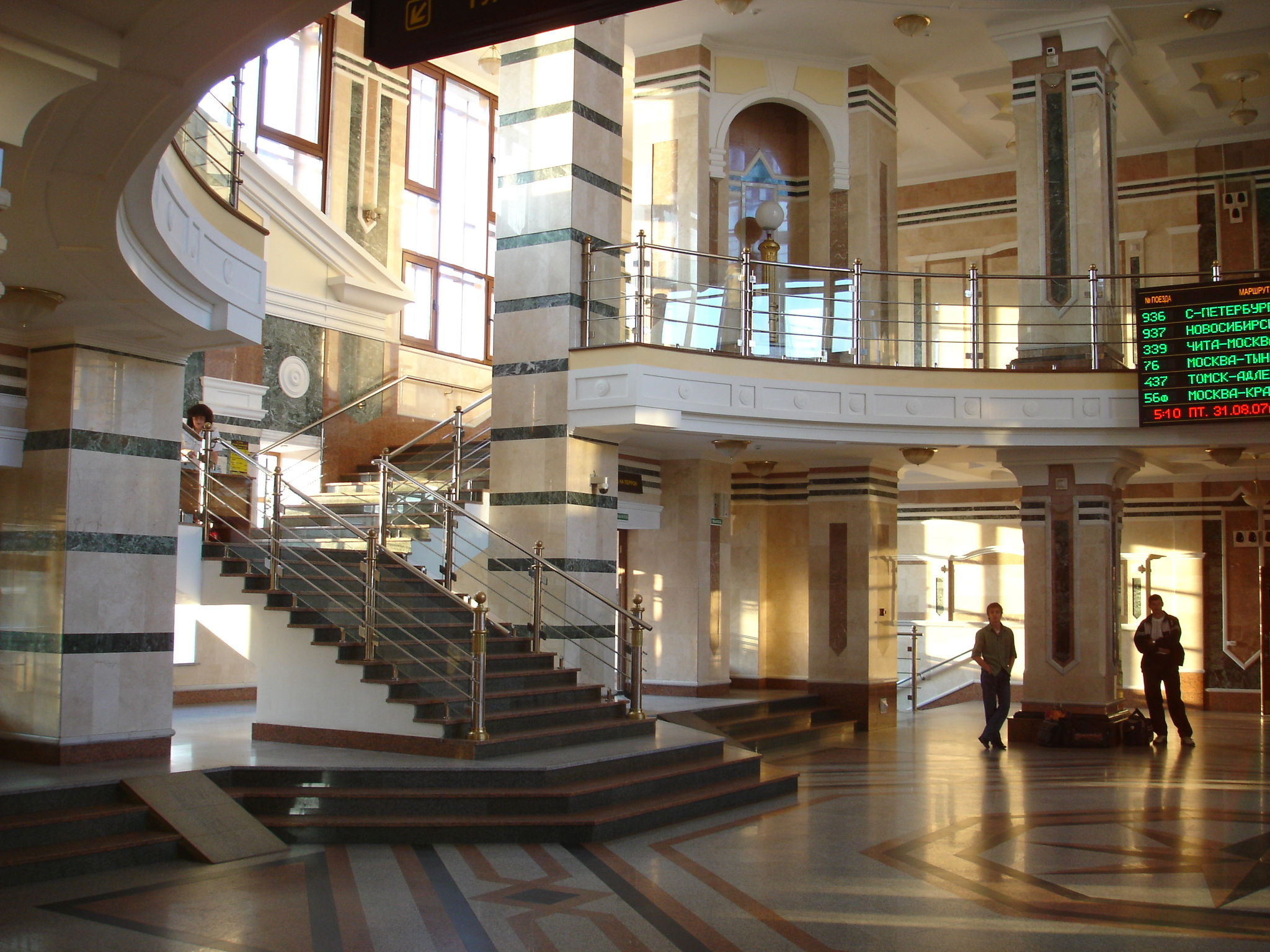
The central hall of the passenger station

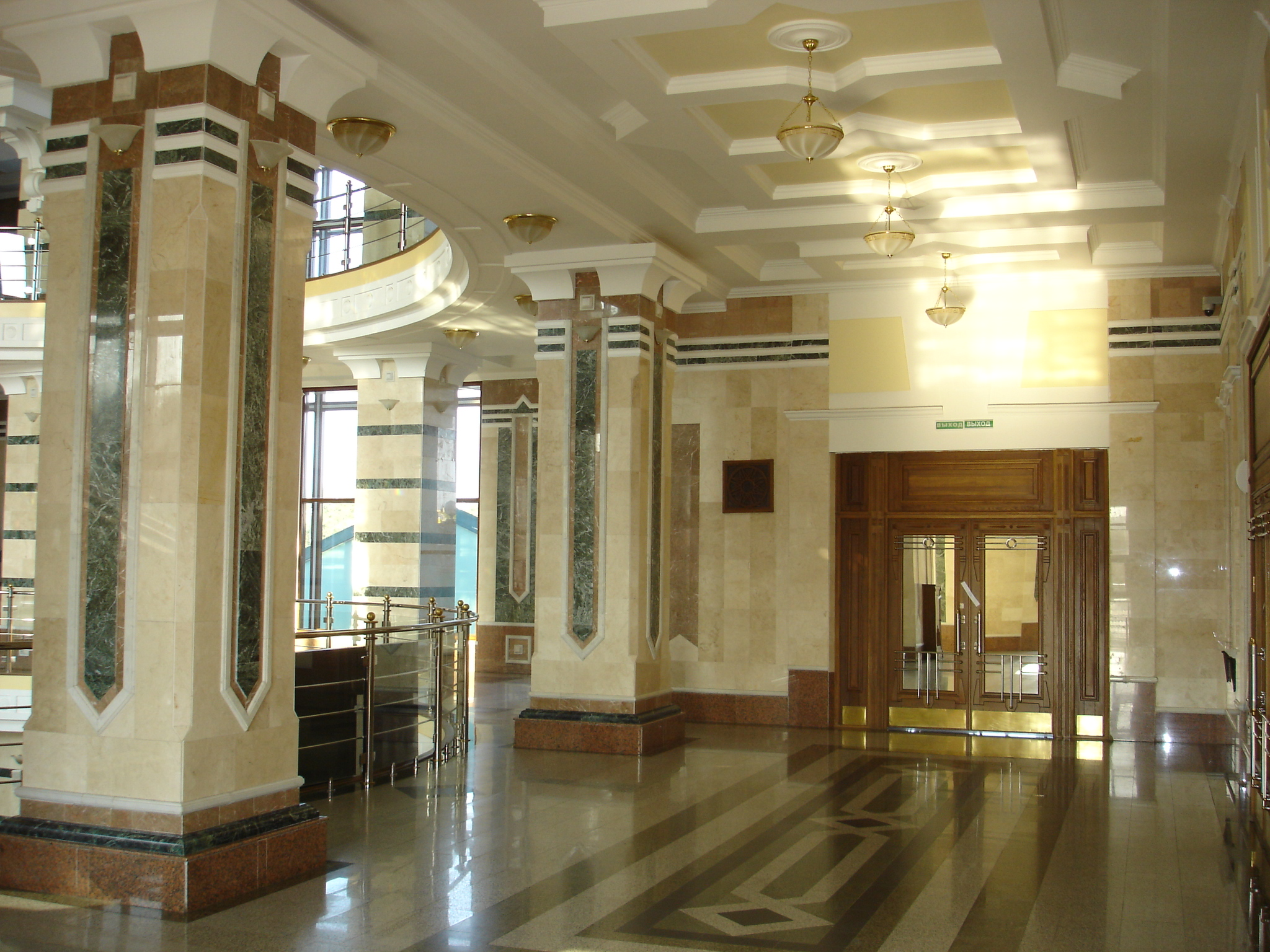
Corner of the central hall of the second floor

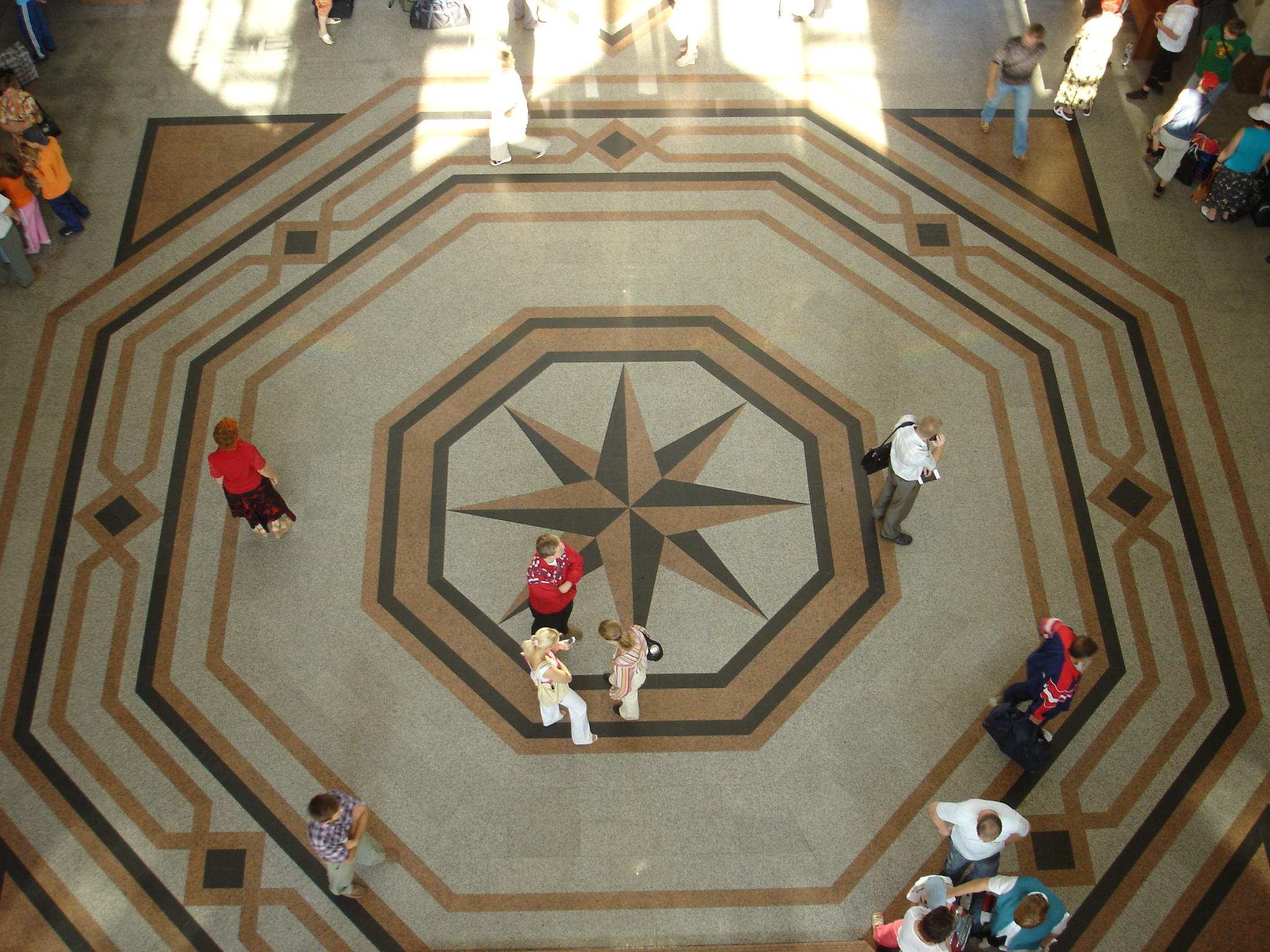
Mosaic floor of the central hall

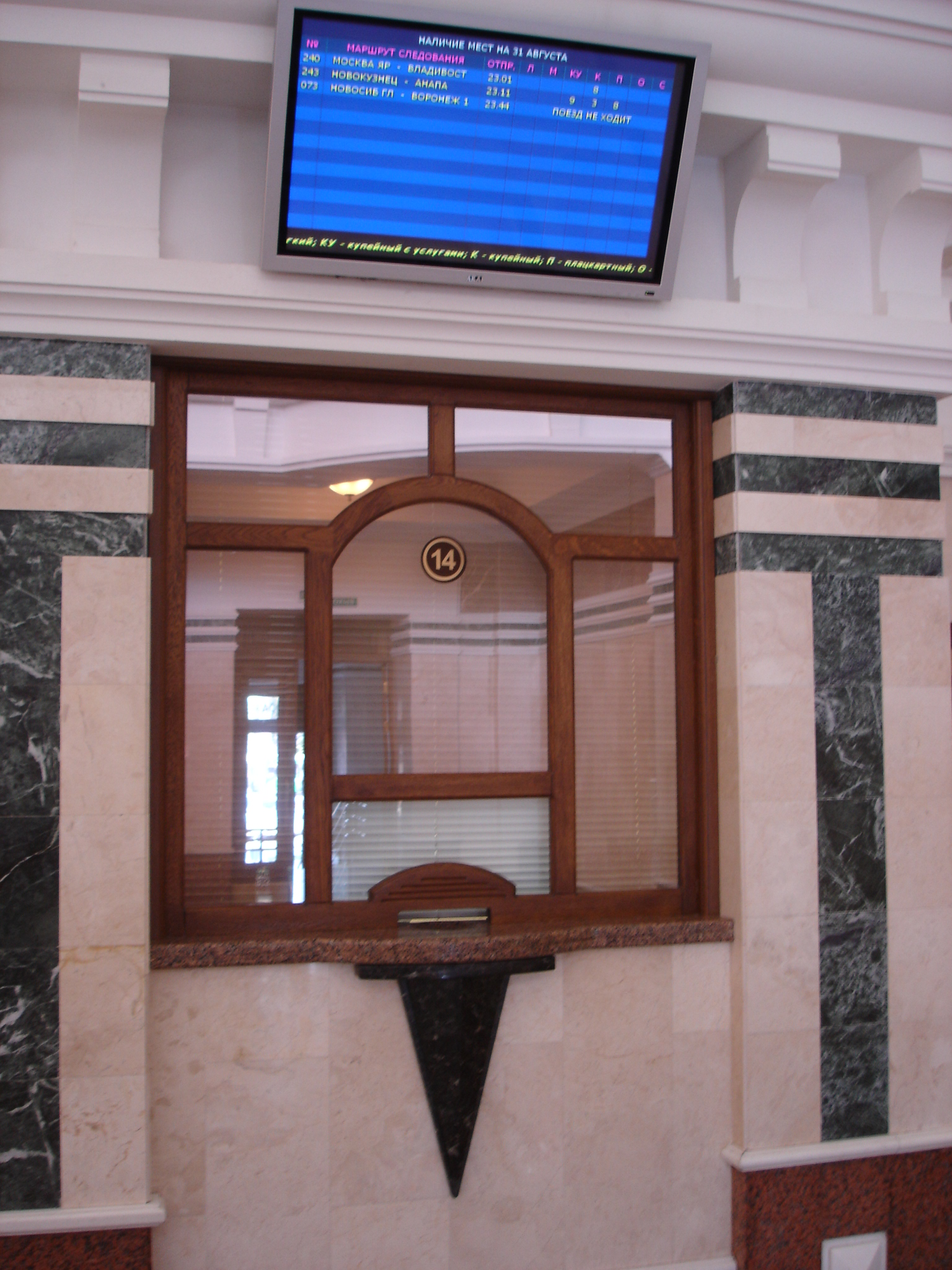
The central hall. Ticket office

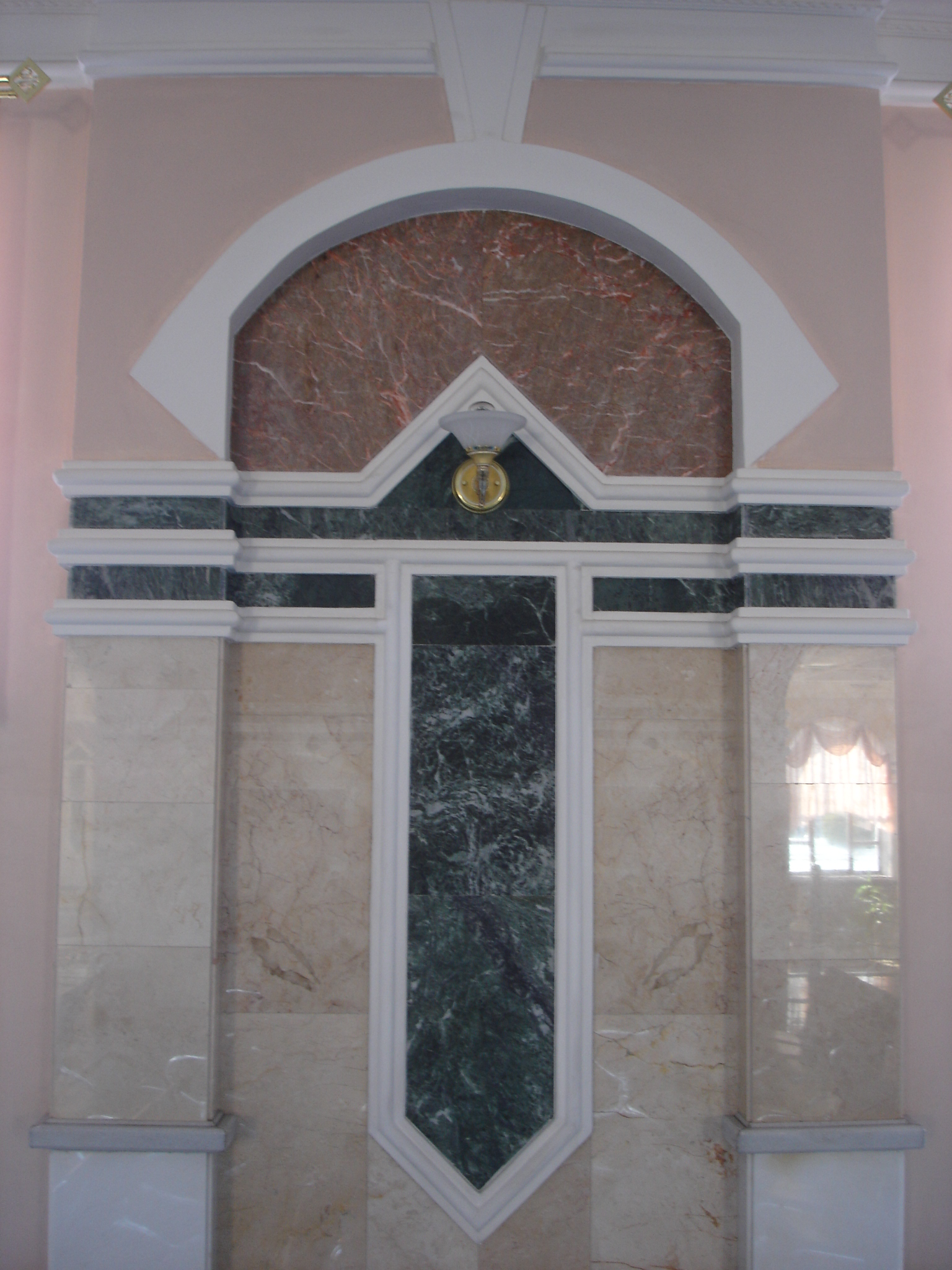
The central hall. An interior decoration detail

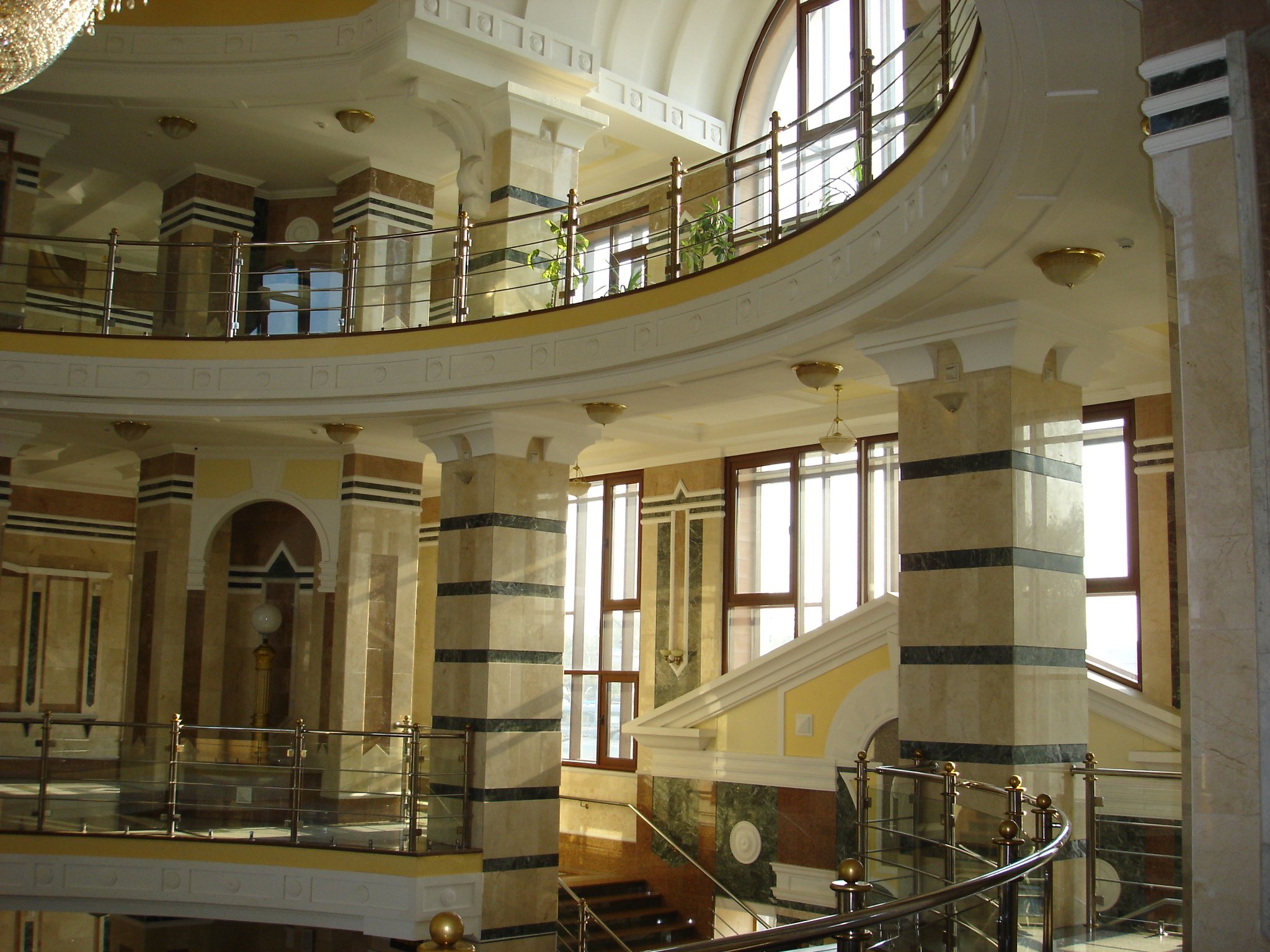
The second and third floors of the central hall of the station

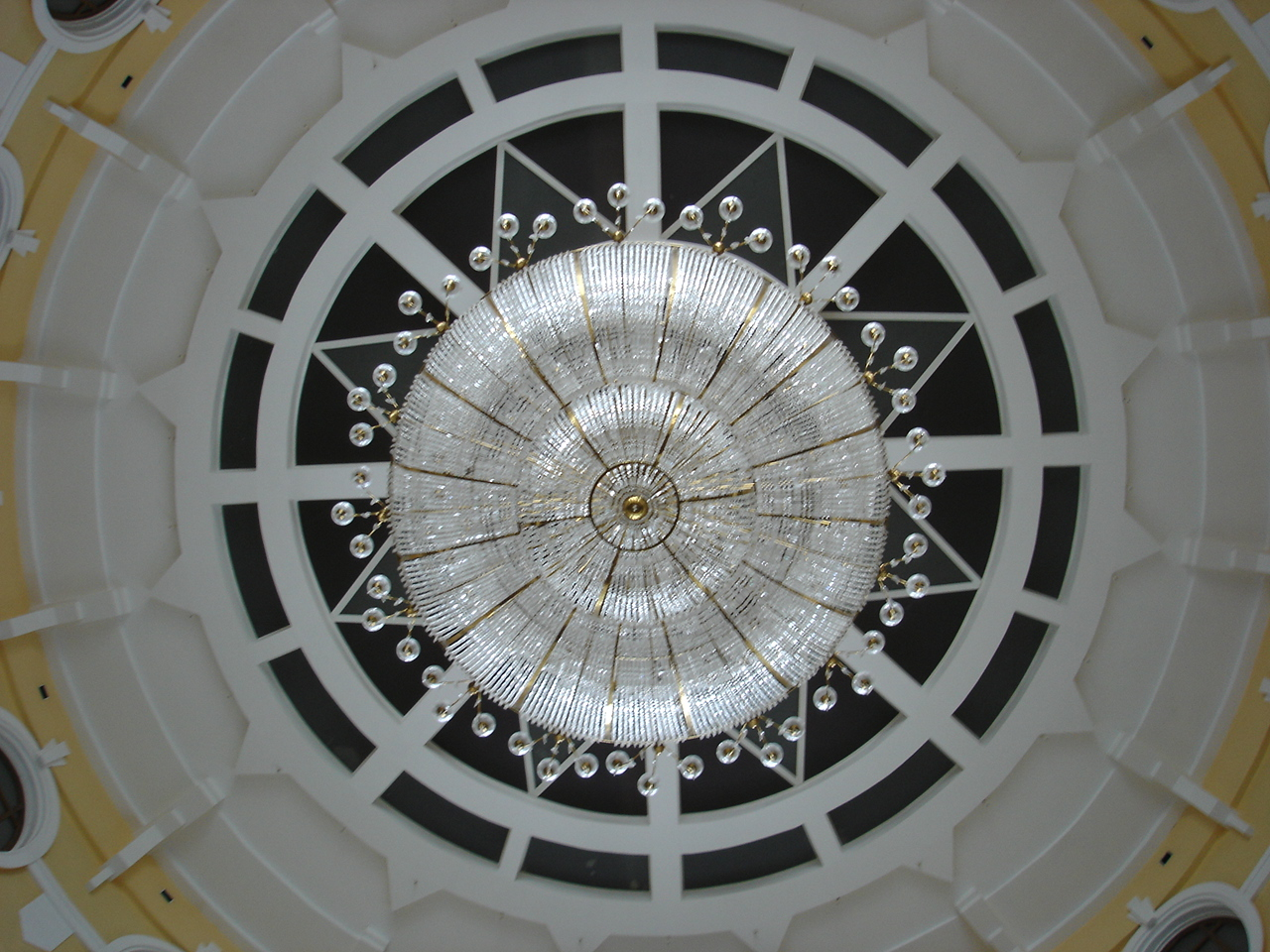
Massive crystal chandelier in the central hall

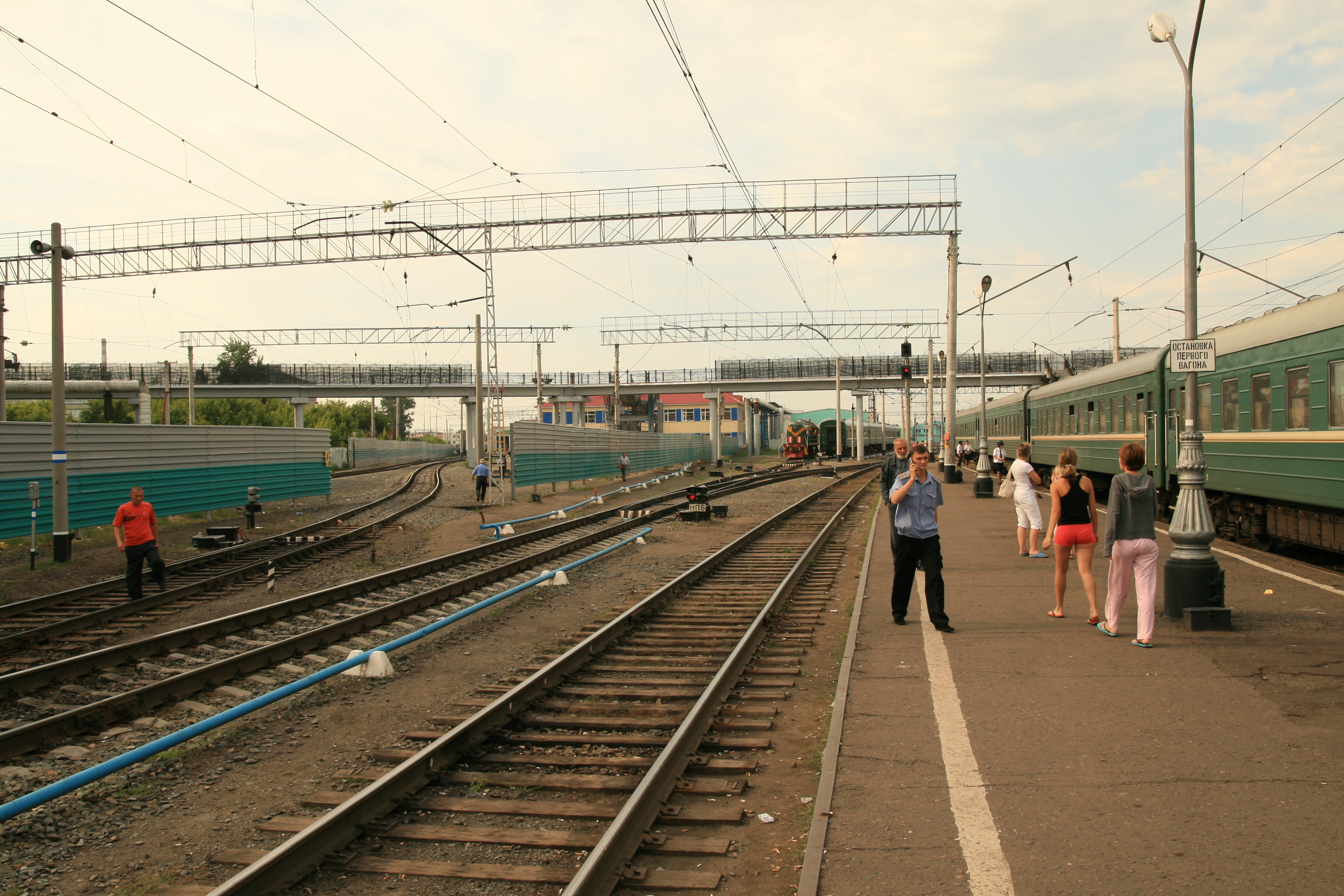
Omsk railway station platform

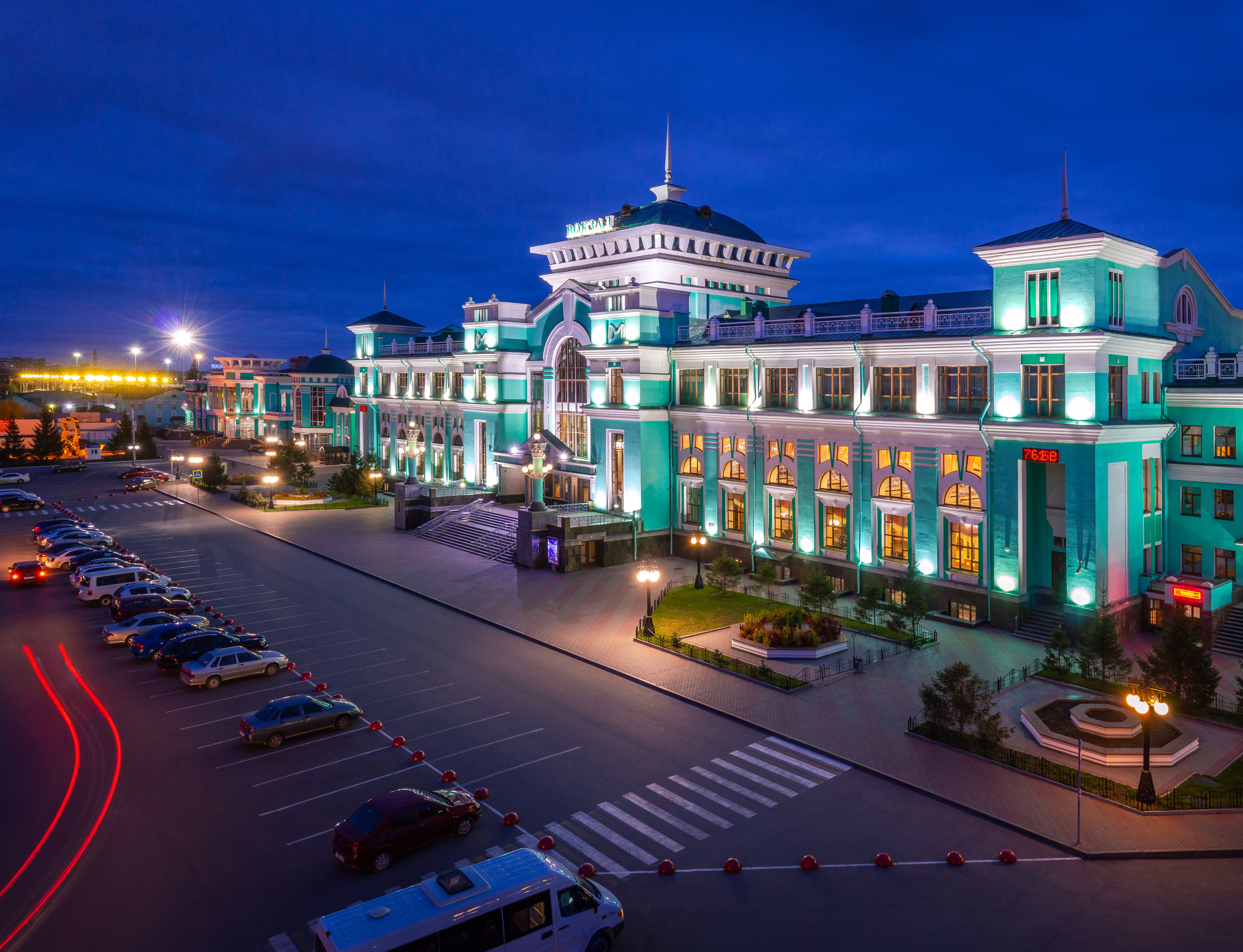
Omsk railway station in 2020

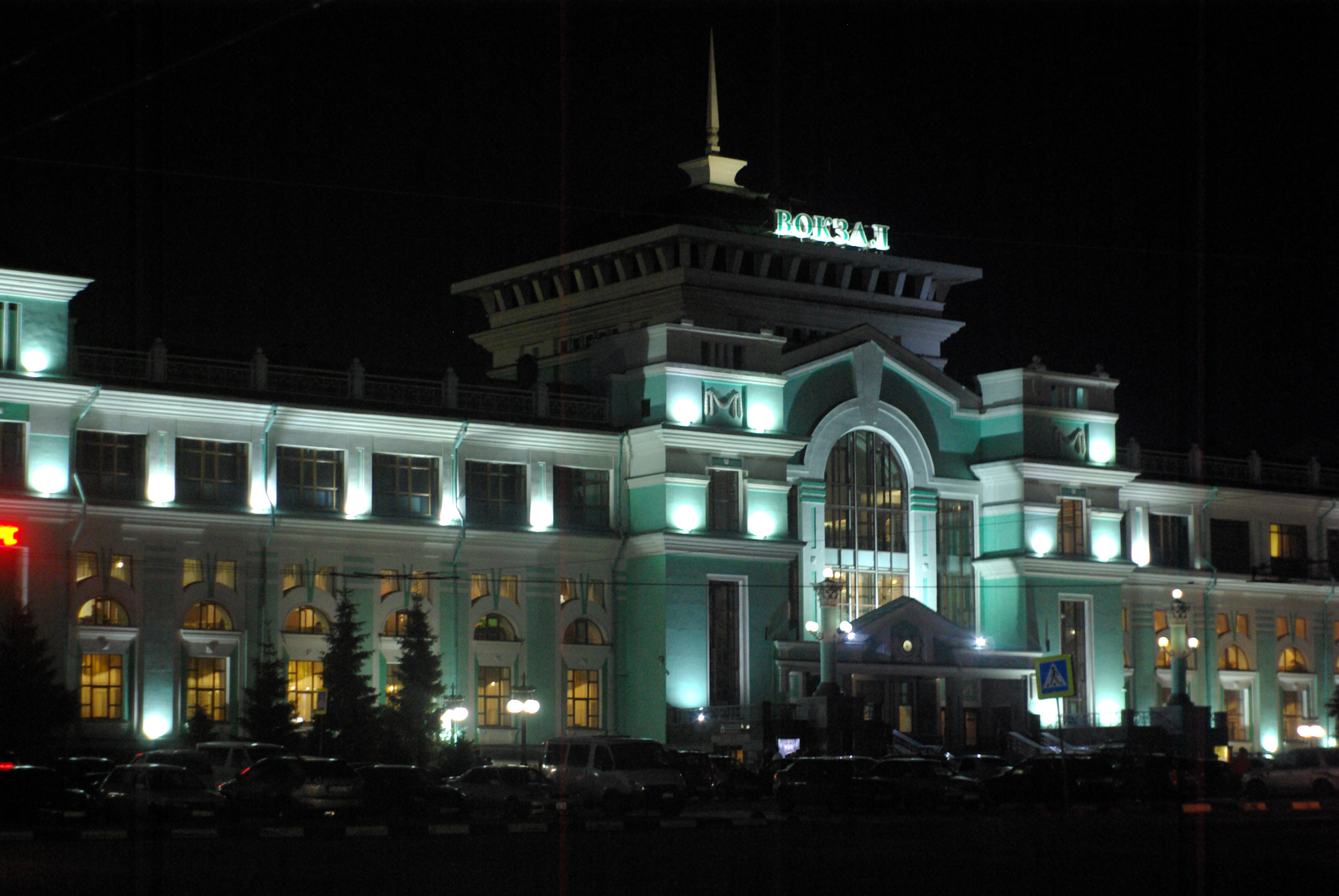
Omsk railway station in 2023
