= Streptomyces flavovariabilis =

Scientific classification
- Domain: Bacteria
- Kingdom: Bacillati
- Phylum: Actinomycetota
- Class: Actinomycetes
- Order: Streptomycetales
- Family: Streptomycetaceae
- Genus: Streptomyces
- Species: S. flavovariabilis

Binomial name
- Streptomyces flavovariabilis (ex Korenyako and Nikitina 1965) Sveshnikova 1986

Type strain
- ATCC 43684, CGMCC 4.1942, DSM 41479, DSM 41503, DSM 41688, INMI 702, JCM 9089, LMG 19905, NBRC 100764, NRRL B-16367, VKM 141, VKM Ac-141

Synonyms
- "Actinomyces flavovariabilis" Korenyako and Nikitina 1965

Species of bacteria

Streptomyces flavovariabilis is a bacterium species from the genus of Streptomyces which has been isolated from soil in Tayga in Siberia in Russia.

== See also ==
- List of Streptomyces species
