= Tomsk-1 railway station =

Railway station in Tomsk, Russia

Tomsk-1 Томск-1
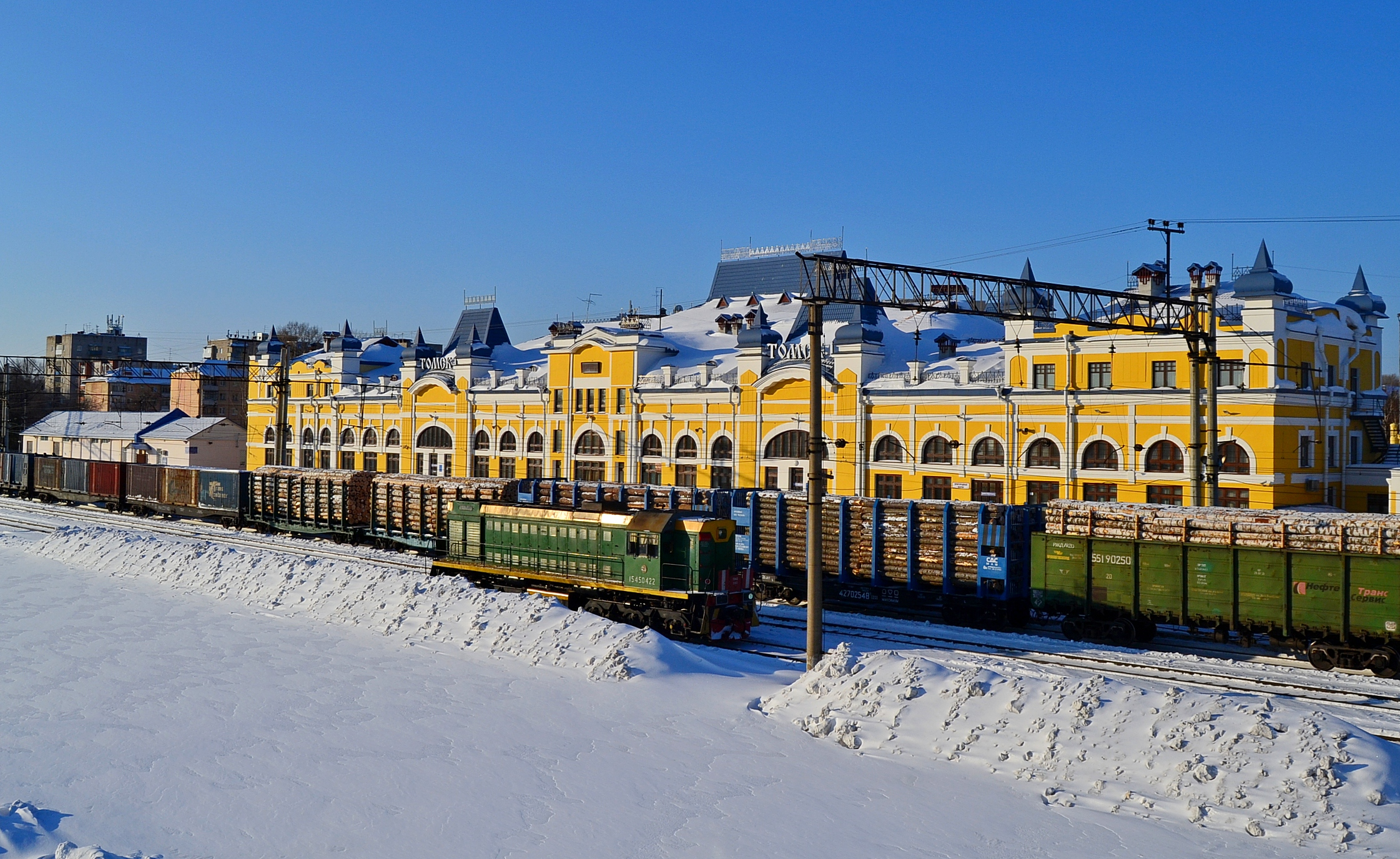
- View of the station from platform 4

General information
- Location: Russia, Tomsk
- Coordinates: 56.4603°N 84.9914°E
- System: West Siberian Railway terminal
- Owner: Russian Railways
- Platforms: 4 (3 island platforms)
- Tracks: 8

Construction
- Parking: yes

Other information
- Station code: 87390
- Fare zone: 0

History
- Opened: 1896
- Former names: Mezeninovka (before 1909)

Services
Preceding station	West Siberian Railway	Following station
Location

Tomsk-1 (Russian: Томск-1) is the main railway station of Tomsk, Russia. It is located on the West Siberian Railway of Russian Railways.

== History ==
With the construction of the Tomsk–Tayga railway line on the site of the station Tomsk-1 was lined up passenger platform Mezeninovka. Over time most of the passengers began to prefer this platform, then Tomsk-2 station, so in 1909 the Tomsk city Duma adopted a decision to rename the Mezeninovka station in Tomsk-1 and Tomsk station in Tomsk-2.

In 1917 the building of the Tomsk-I station was built with lighting, the architect was Yakov Yakovlevich Rodyukov.

== Station building ==
The station building has been expanded several times and rebuilt. The last time the station was reconstructed in 2001-2004. Construction work began in October 2001, the reconstruction of the station was completed in 2004 for the 400th anniversary of Tomsk.

The station consists of a spacious two-storey building with three entrances and three exits to the trains. For passage to the second way there is an underground passage, which is often closed, as the number of arriving-departing trains can be dispensed one by one.

== Trains ==
Only 5 trains pass the station:

- Tomsk–Moscow
- Tomsk–Anapa
- Tomsk–Leninogorsk
- Tomsk–Novokuznetsk
- Tomsk–Tayga
