= Water Tower No. 3 (Novosibirsk) =

Water tower located in Novosibirsk, Russia

- Водонапорная башня № 3
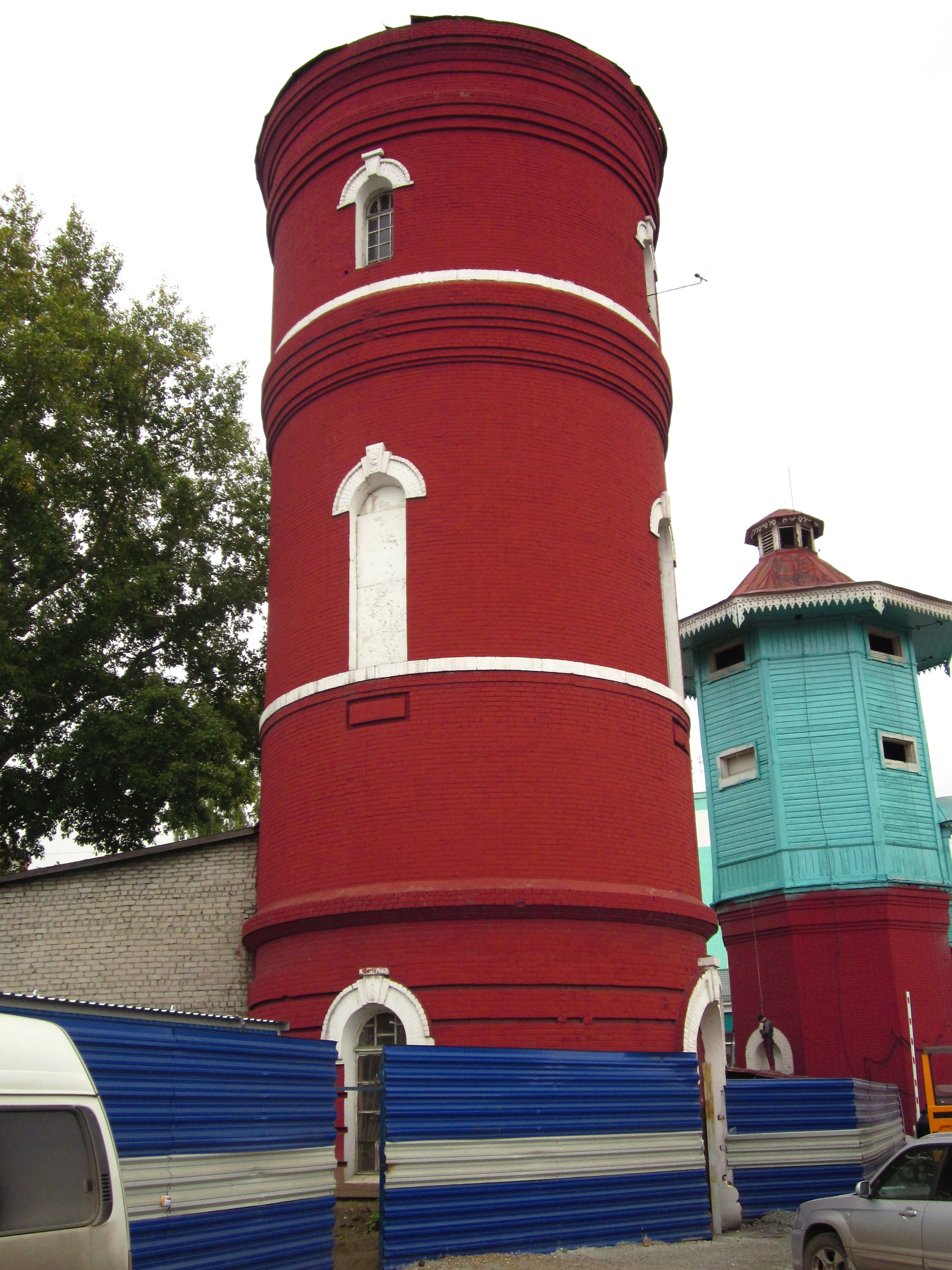
- Interactive map of the Water Tower No. 3 area

General information
- Type: Water tower
- Location: Novosibirsk, Russia, 16, Dvizhentsev Street
- Coordinates: 55°02′23″N 82°53′33″E
- Completed: 1912

Technical details
- Structural system: Brickwork

Water Tower No. 3 (Russian: Водонапорная башня № 3) is a water tower in Zheleznodorozhny District of Novosibirsk, Russia. It was built in 1912. Next to Tower No. 3 is the Water Tower No. 1.

== Description ==
The tower is located near the line of the West Siberian Railway north-west of the Novosibirsk-Glavny Station.

It is built of bricks, has three tiers and stands on a rusticated plinth of granite stones.
