= Water Tower No. 1 (Novosibirsk) =

Water tower in Zheleznodorozhny, Novosibirsk, Russia

- Водонапорная башня № 1
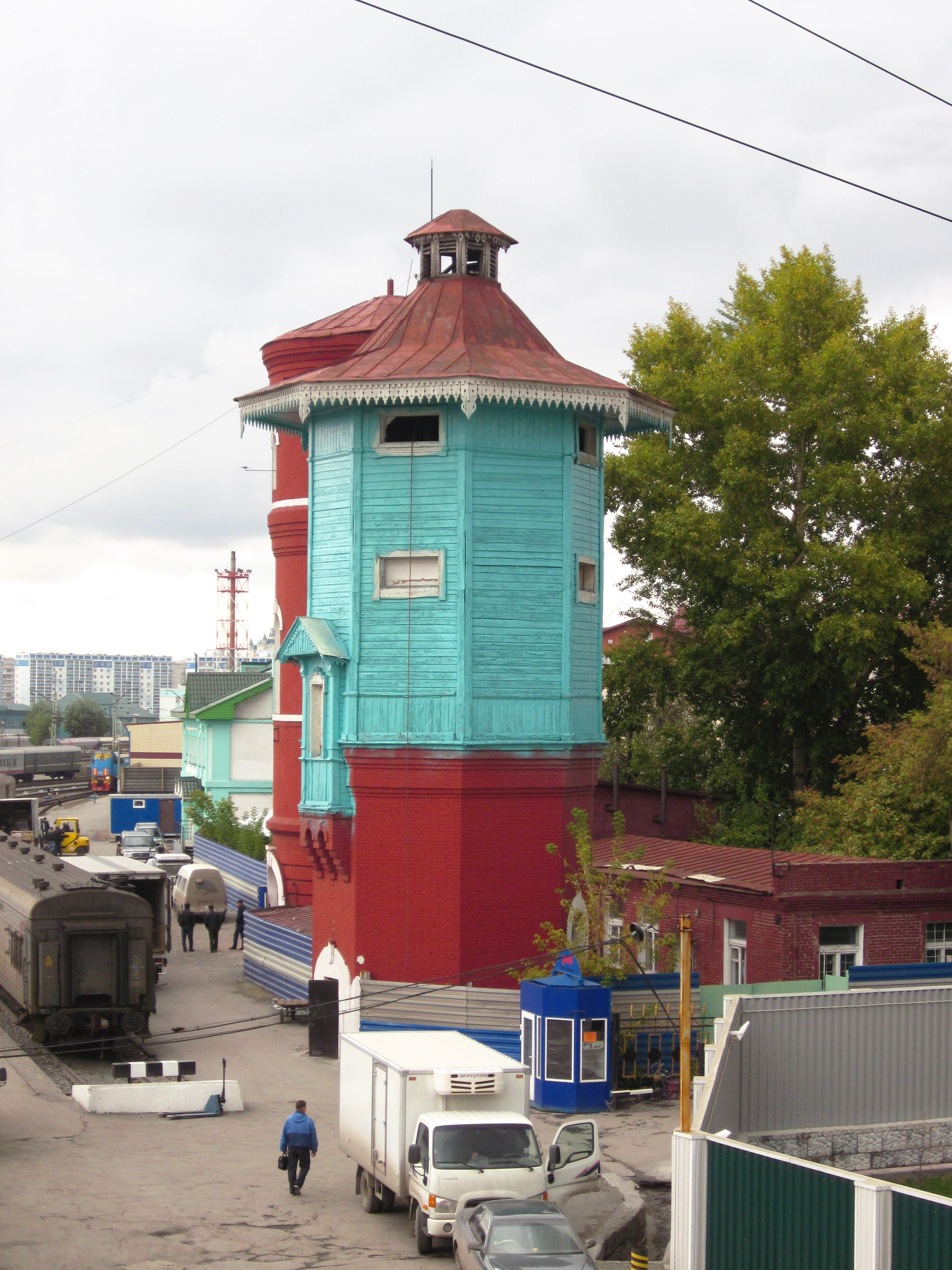
- Interactive map of the Water Tower No. 1 area

General information
- Type: Water tower
- Location: Novosibirsk, Russia, 16, Dvizhentsev Street
- Coordinates: 55°02′22″N 82°53′33″E
- Completed: 1894

Water Tower No. 1 (Russian: Водонапорная башня № 1) is a water tower in Zheleznodorozhny District of Novosibirsk, Russia. It was built in 1894. Next to Tower No. 1 is the Water Tower No. 3.

== Description ==
The water tower is located near the line of the West Siberian Railway north-west of the Novosibirsk-Glavny Station.
