= Tomsk Railway =

Railway in Soviet Union

Tomsk Railway Томская железная дорога
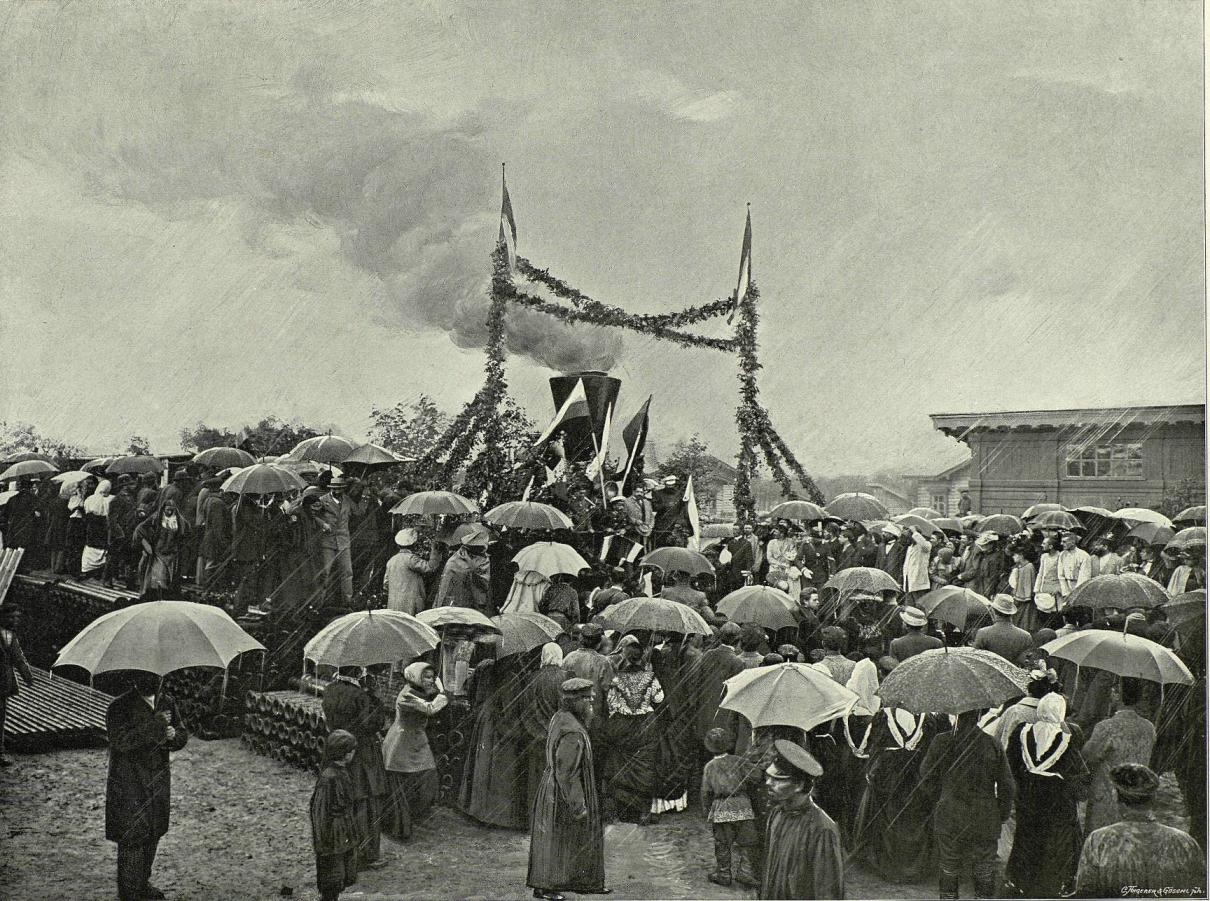
- Opening of the line in 1896.

Overview
- Headquarters: Tomsk
- Locale: Russian Empire, Siberia; Soviet Union, Siberia
- Dates of operation: 1912–1961
- Predecessor: Siberian Railway
- Successor: West Siberian Railway

Technical
- Track gauge: 1,520 mm (4 ft 11 27/32 in)

Tomsk Railway was a rail operator in Siberia, which existed as a company from 1912 to 1961 in Russian Empire, then in USSR. The management of the line was in Tomsk, since 1934 in Novosibirsk.

== History ==
Tomsk railway was formed from the Siberian railway, which in 1912 was divided into two parts: in the Omsk Railway and Tomsk Railways. After the October Revolution Tomsk Railway came into Achinsk Minusinsk, first is expected to launch and Altai Railway. The accession of the neighbouring roads allowed Tomsk railway eventually become the biggest longest and most powerful for the loads among the Railways of the USSR.

In 1961 the Tomsk railway was united with Omsk railway and became the major West Siberian Railway.
