= Tayga railway station =

Railway station in Russia

Tayga Тайга
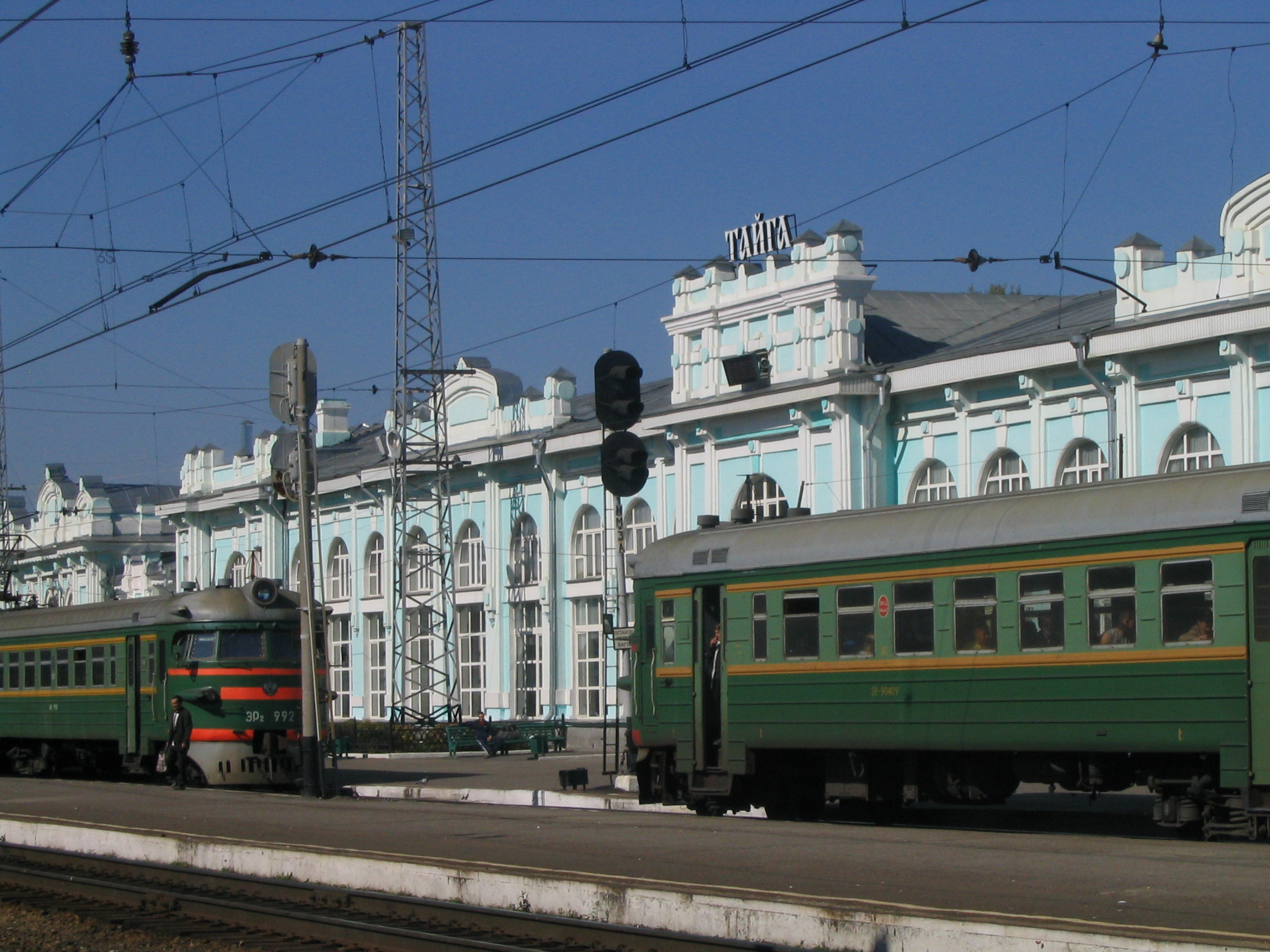
- View of the station from platform 3.

General information
- Location: Tayga, Russia
- Coordinates: 56.0621°N 85.6300°E
- System: West Siberian Railway terminal
- Owner: Russian Railways (West Siberian Railway)
- Lines: Novosibirsk—Krasnoyarsk; Tayga—Tomsk; Tayga—Kemerovo
- Platforms: 3 (2 island platforms)
- Tracks: 10

Construction
- Parking: yes

Other information
- Station code: 873308

History
- Opened: 1898

Services
Preceding station	West Siberian Railway	Following station
Location

Tayga (Russian: Тайга-Главная) is a major junction railway station on the West Siberian Railway in Russia. The biggest railway station of Tayga and one of the biggest in Russia.

== History ==
After the completion of the Siberian Railway in Central Siberia was an unmarked junction, where the railway went to Tomsk. Later the siding was called Tomsk-Tayozhny, and in 1913, was renamed into Tayga.

The design and construction of the station was attended by Russian engineer and writer Garin-Mikhailovsky.

After construction of the bypass railway and the construction of another station in the town of Tayga (Tayga-2) for a long time, the station was called Tayga-1. However, in the 1990s after partial disassembly of a bypass road and Tayga-2 conversion in the siding, the station again became known as Tayga (without a number).

During the use of steam locomotives required much water. First it was acquired from wells and serving on the speakers using a typical water tower. But eventually the water no longer sufficed and it was necessary to build a water pipeline from the Yaya river, where a dam and a pumping station were built.

== Trains ==
- Moscow — Vladivostok
- Moscow — Beijing
- Moscow — Ulaanbaatar
- Moscow — Tomsk
- Moscow — Khabarovsk
- Moscow — Krasnoyarsk
- Kislovodsk — Irkutsk
- Moscow — Abakan
- Moscow — Chita
- Moscow — Neryungri
- Moscow — Ulan-Ude
- Moscow — Severobaikalsk
- Adler — Krasnoyarsk
- Adler — Irkutsk
- Anapa — Tomsk
- Novokuznetsk — Tomsk

== Gallery ==
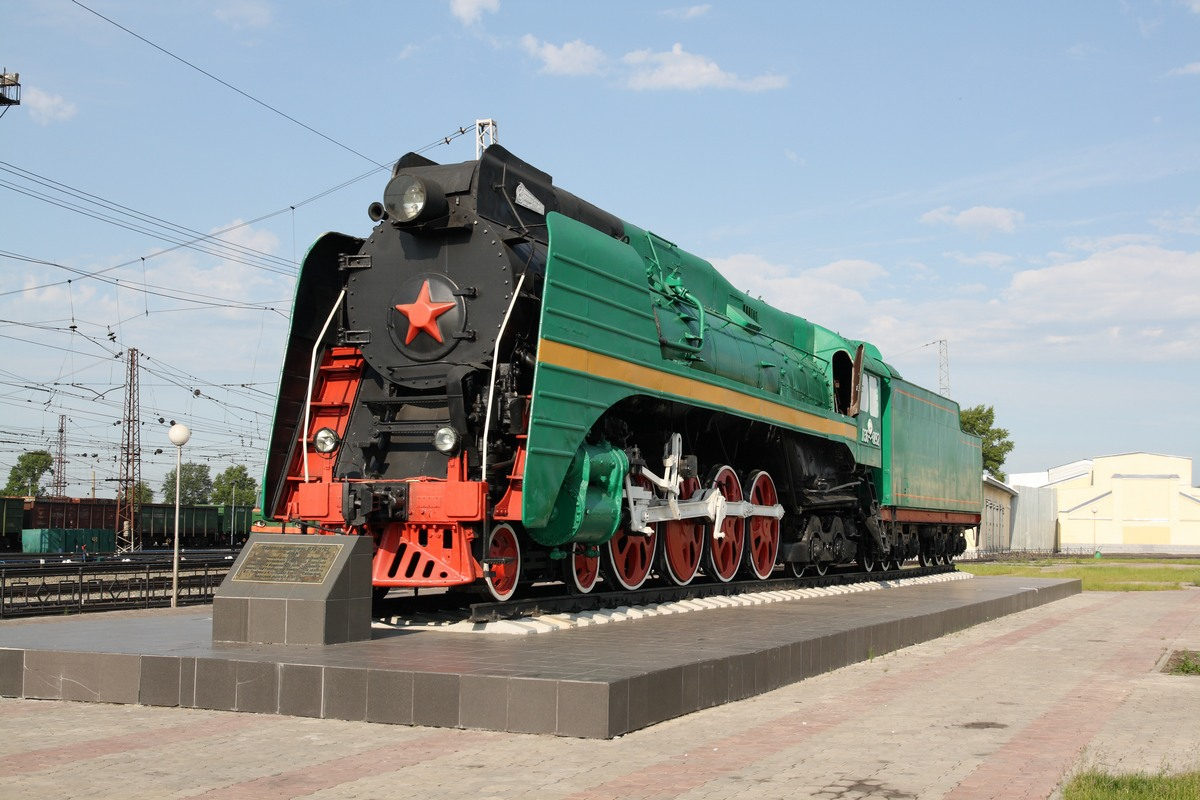
Monument-steam locomotive P36-0192, a historical object of cultural heritage.

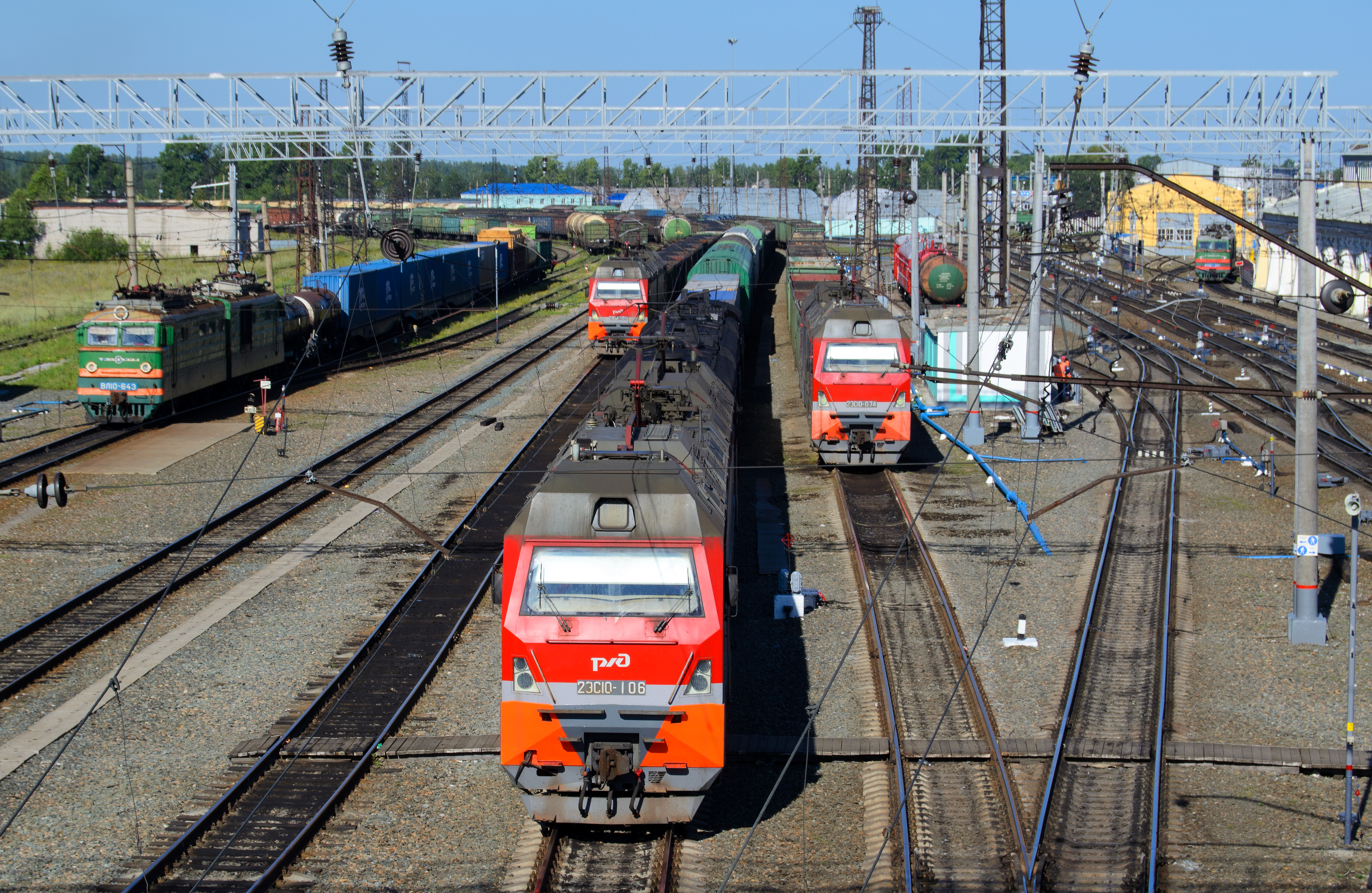
Freight trains driven by electric locomotives VL10 and 2ES10, fire train, depot buildings

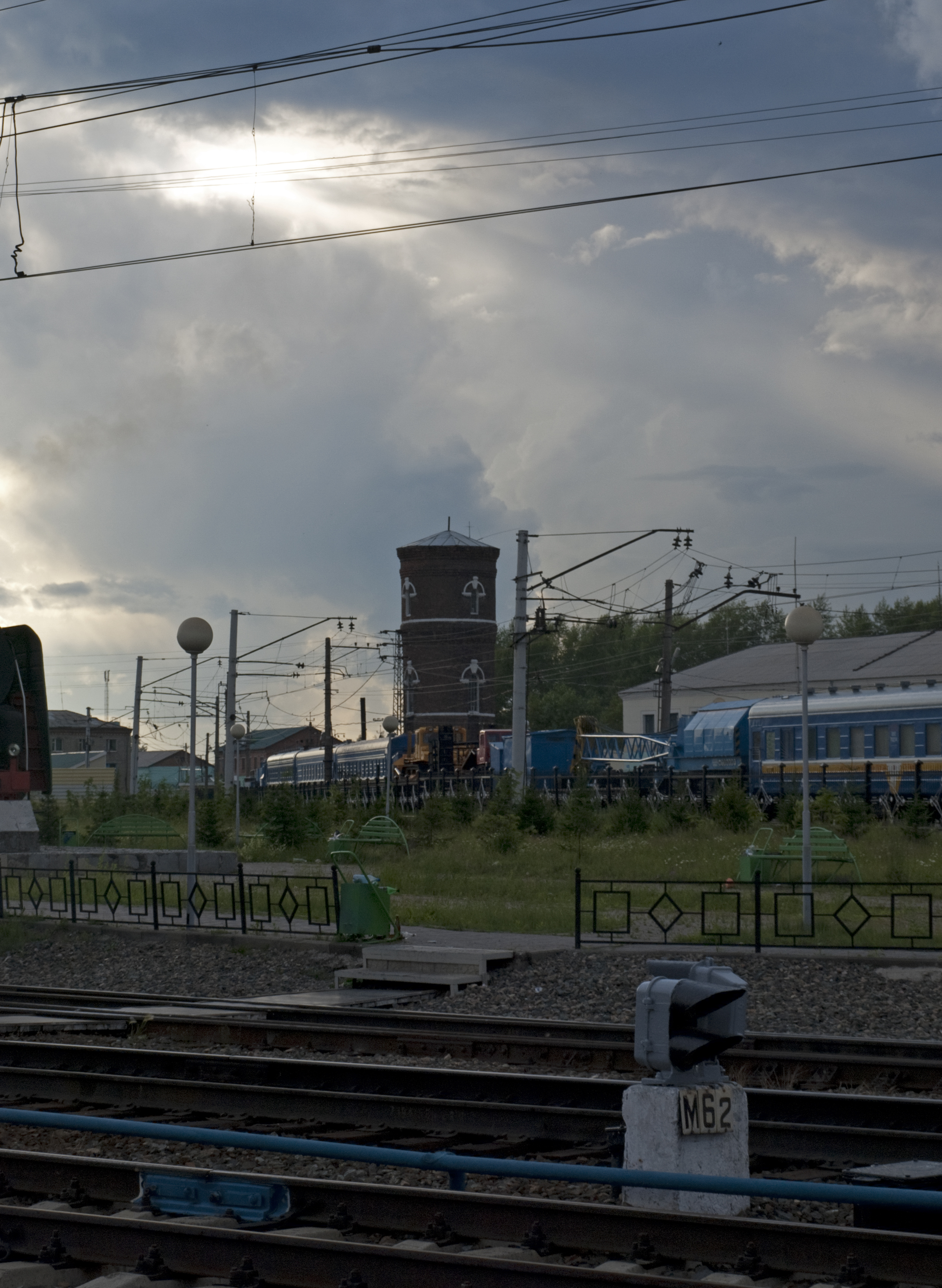
Water tower, architectural cultural heritage site and restoration train.

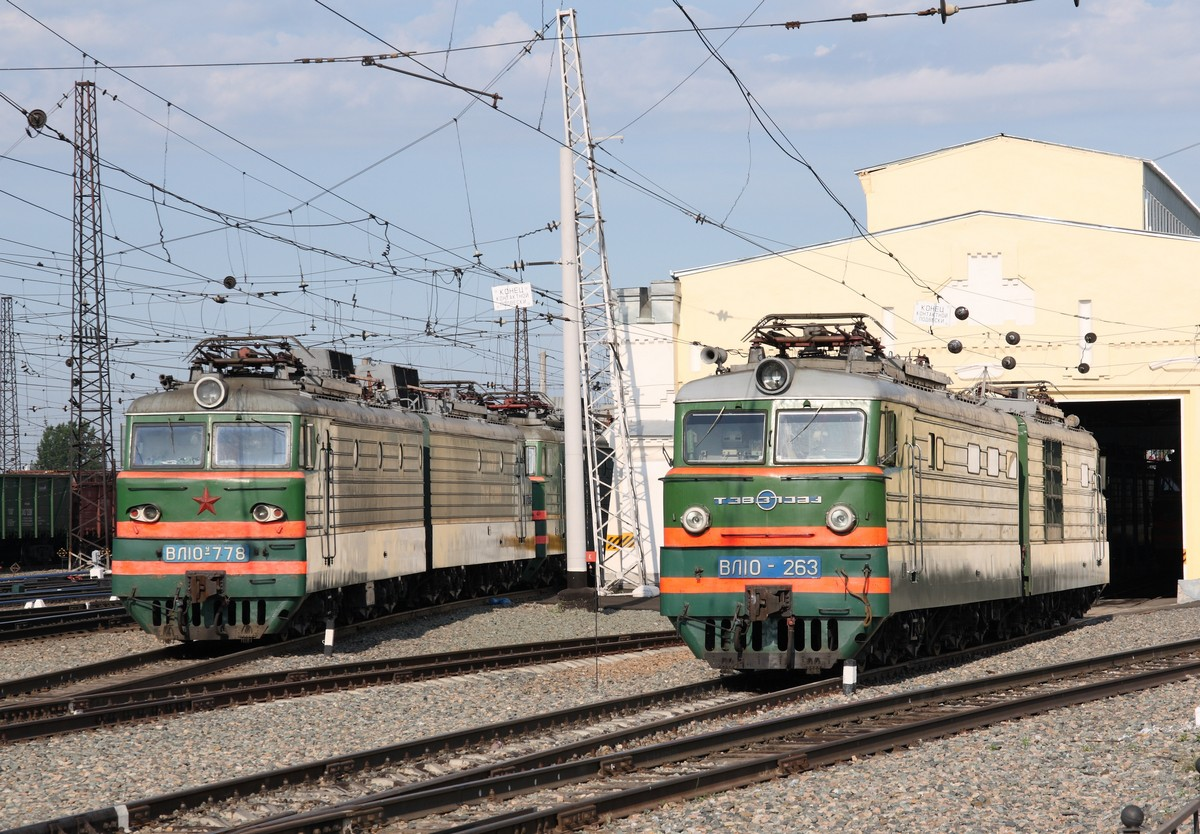
VL10, locomotive depot.

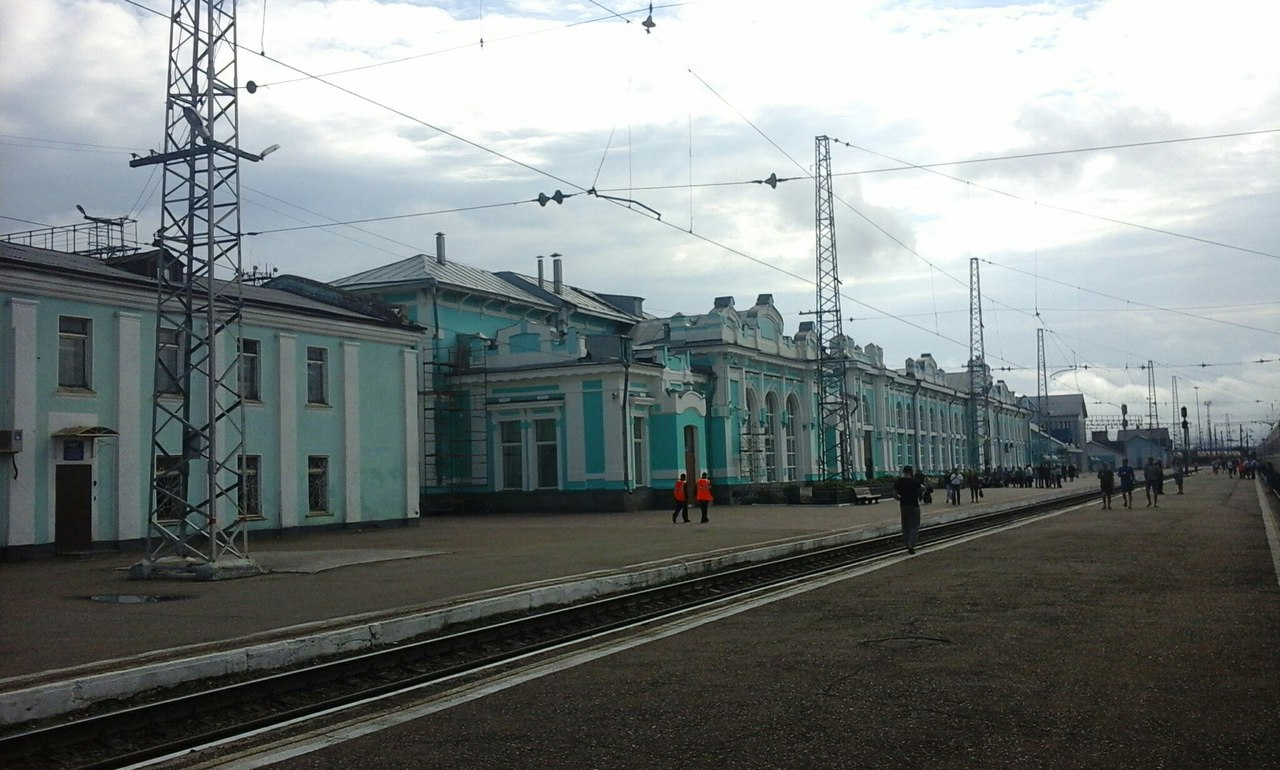
View from the platform.

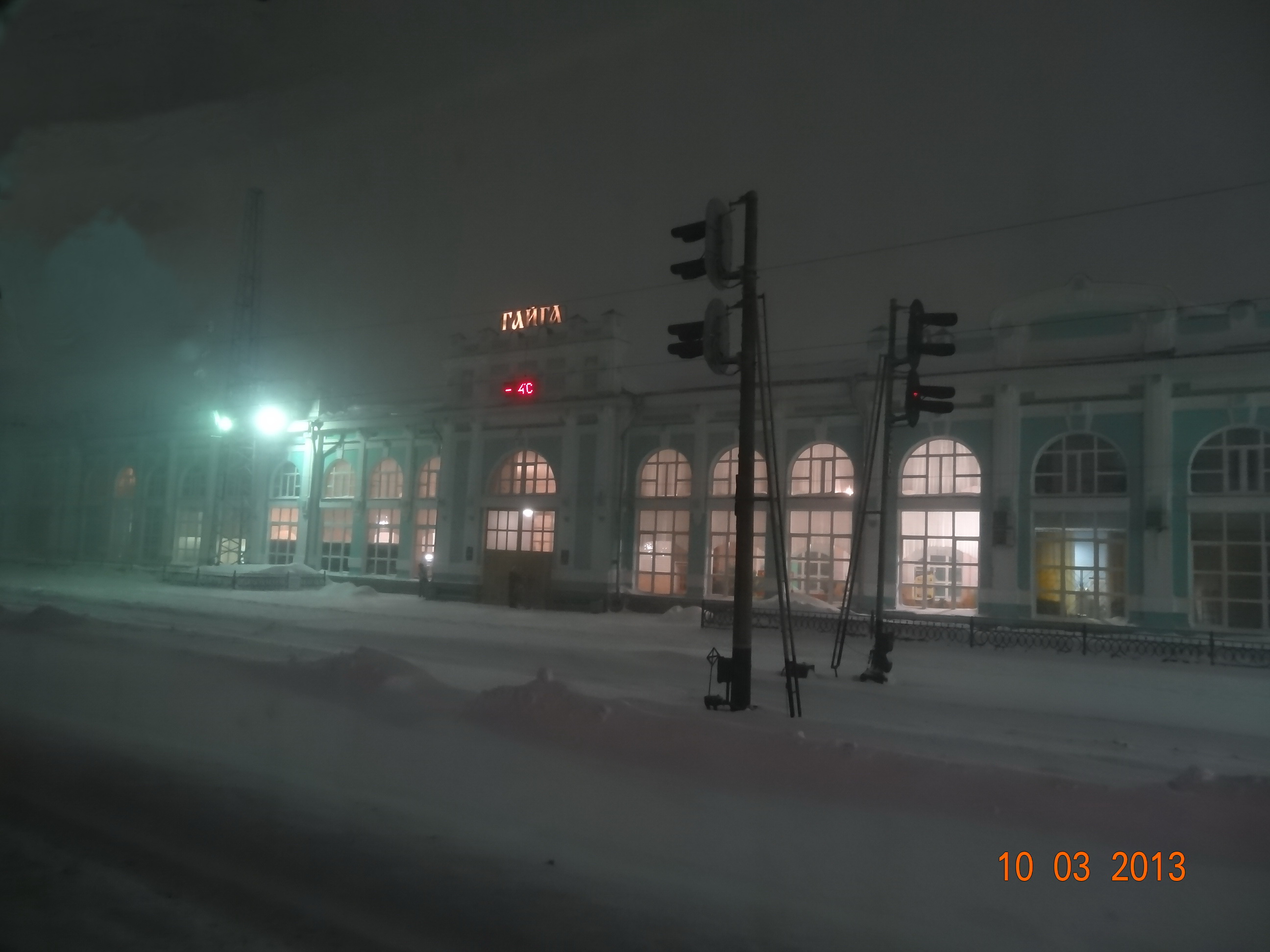
In a snowstorm.

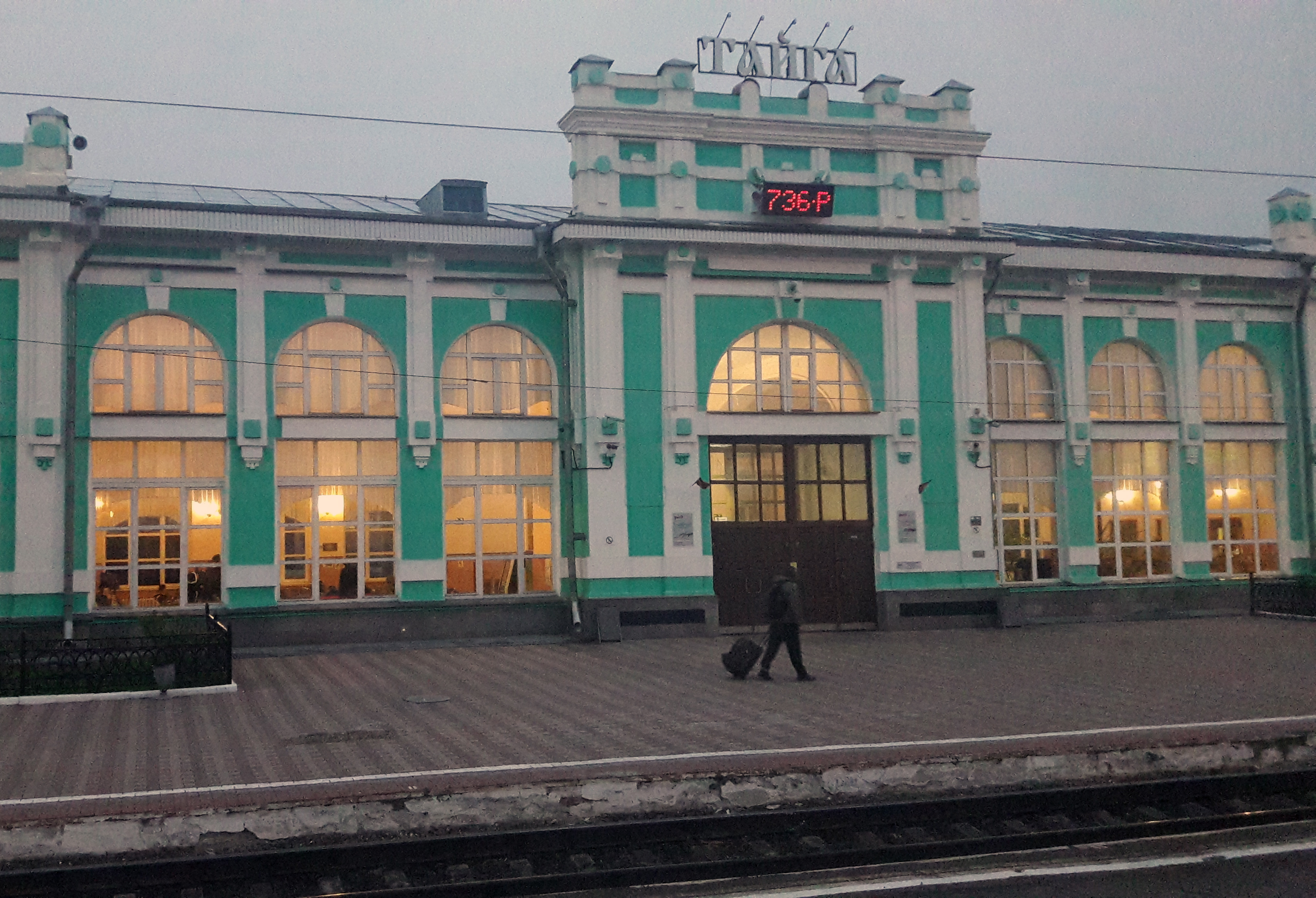

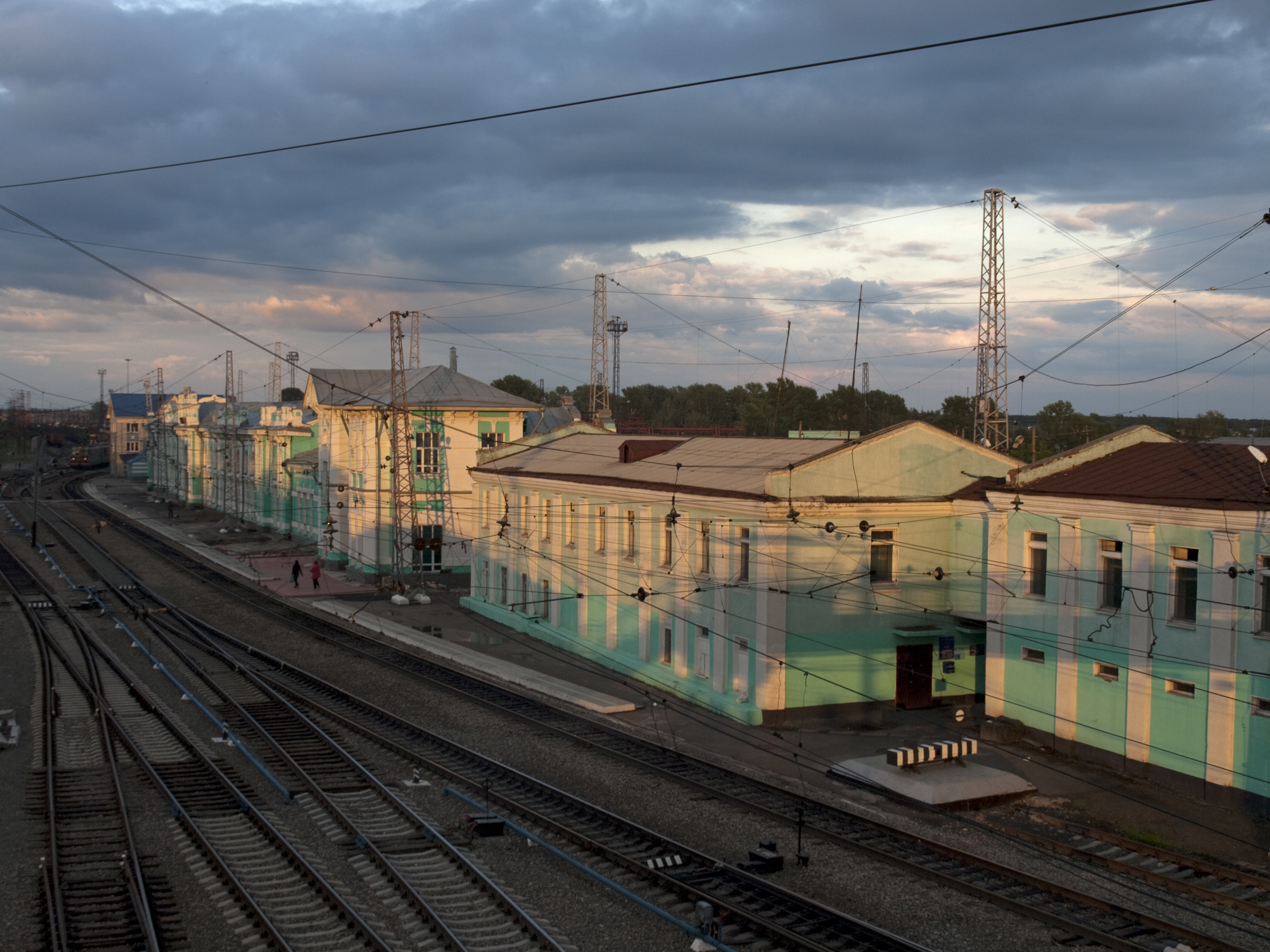
Panoramic view.
