= Novosibirsk railway station =

Railway station in Novosibirsk, Russia

Novosibirsk–Glavny Новосибирск–Главный
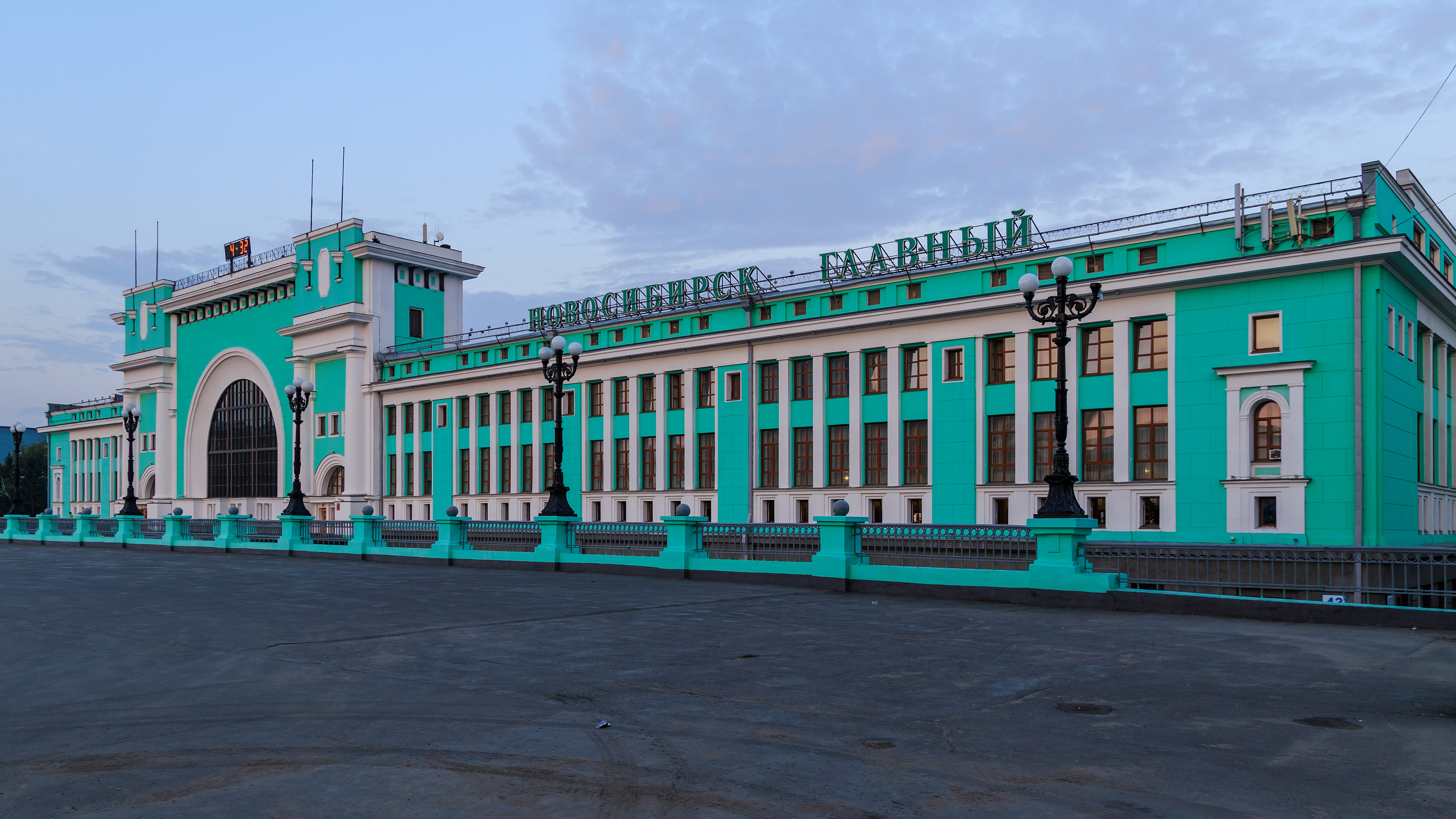
- View of the station from the street.

General information
- Location: Zheleznodorozhny District, Novosibirsk
- Coordinates: 55.0358°N 82.9000°E
- Owner: Russian Railways
- Operator: West Siberian Railway
- Platforms: 8 (7 island platforms)
- Tracks: 14
- Train operators: Russian Railways; Ulaanbataar Railway; China Railway; Kazakhstan Temir Joly; Uzbek Railways

Construction
- Structure type: At-grade
- Parking: Yes

Other information
- Station code: 87390
- Fare zone: 0

History
- Opened: 1893
- Electrified: 25 kV 50 Hz AC overhead line
- Former names: Ob' (before 1909); Novonikolaevsk (1909-1926)

Services
| Preceding station | Russian Railways | Following station |
|---|---|---|
| Ob towards Moscow Yaroslavsky | Moscow–Vladivostok | Mochische towards Vladivostok |
| Terminus | Novosibirsk–Lokot | Cherepanovo towards Lokot |
| Preceding station | KTJ | Following station |
| Terminus | Turkestan–Siberia Railway | Novosibirsk-Yuzhnyy towards Arys I |
Route map
Location

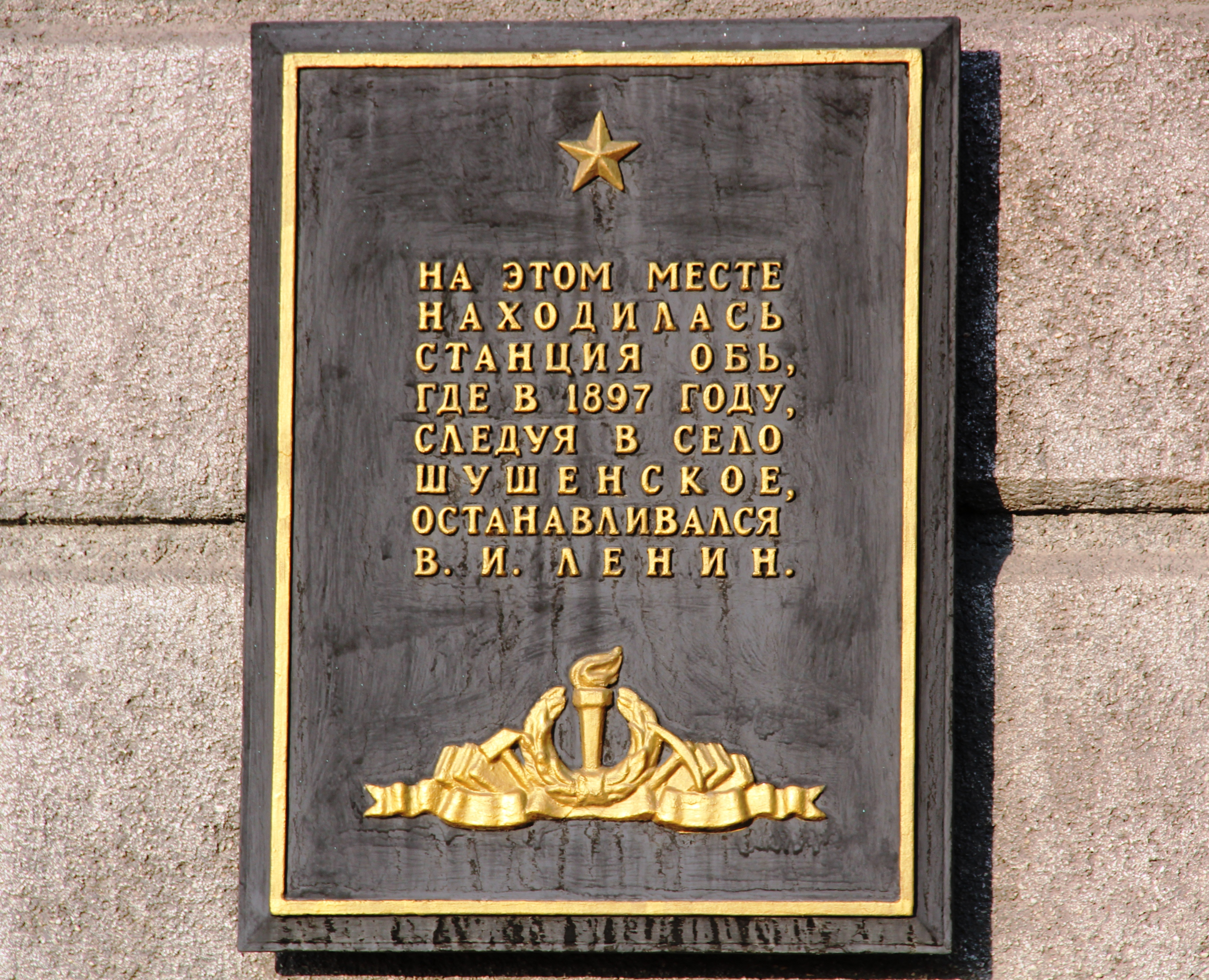
Sign about Lenin's visit

Novosibirsk–Glavny is the primary passenger railway station for the city of Novosibirsk in Russia, and an important stop along the Trans-Siberian Railway and Turkestan–Siberia Railway. The station is one of the largest in Russia. The main building takes an area of 30,000 square metres.

== Trains and destinations ==
=== International ===
| Number | Name | Destination | Operated by |
|---|---|---|---|
| 001М/002Щ | Rossiya; Россия | Moscow (Yaroslavsky); Vladivostok (cars: Pyongyang, Tumangang) | Russian Railways |
| 003З/004З | | Moscow (Yaroslavsky); Beijing (Main); Runs through Mongolia | China Railway |
| 005Щ/006Щ | | Moscow (Yaroslavsky); Ulaanbaatar (cars: Erdenet) | Russian Railways; Ulaanbataar Railway |
| 019Ч/020Щ | Vostok; Восток | Moscow (Yaroslavsky); Beijing (Main) | Russian Railways |
| 059Н/059С | | Kislovodsk; Novokuznetsk; Runs through Kazakhstan | Russian Railways |
| 063Б/064Б | | Minsk (cars: Brest) | Belarusian Railways |
| 123Н/124В | | Belgorod; Runs through Kazakhstan | Russian Railways |
| 133Н/133С | | Anapa; Tomsk; Runs through Kazakhstan | Russian Railways |
| 363T/363У | | Karaganda; Tomsk | Kazakhstan Temir Zholy |
| 369Н/369Ф | | Tashkent; Runs through Kazakhstan | Uzbek Railways |
