= Tomsk-2 railway station =

Railway station in Tomsk, Russia

Tomsk-2 Томск-2
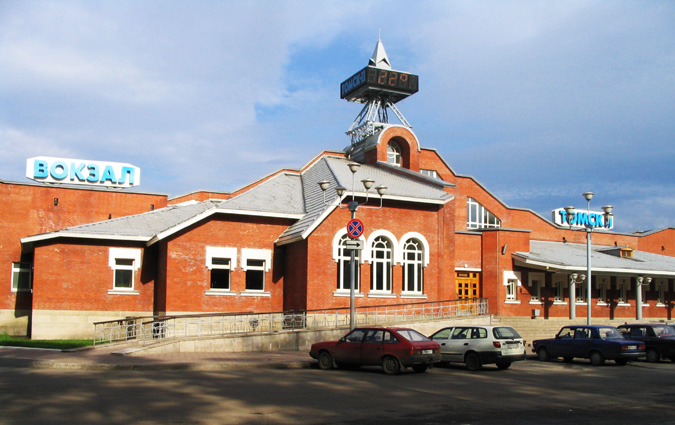
- View of the station from Vokzalnaya street.

General information
- Location: Russia, Tomsk
- Coordinates: 56.5064°N 84.9989°E
- System: West Siberian Railway terminal
- Owner: Russian Railways
- Platforms: 2 (1 island platforms)
- Tracks: 8

Construction
- Parking: yes

Other information
- Station code: 87400
- Fare zone: 10

History
- Opened: 1896
- Former names: Tomsk (before 1909)

Services
Preceding station	West Siberian Railway	Following station
Location

Tomsk-2 (Russian: Томск-2) is a railway station in Tomsk, Russia.

== Main information ==
The station is located in October district of Tomsk. Before the Tomsk-1 Railway station was opened, Tomsk-2 (Tomsk) station was the main station of the city.

Behind the station there is the biggest in Tomsk Oblast locomotive and coach depots.

Tomsk-2 is a terminus for passenger trains, but freight trains can go further to Tomsk-Tovarniy, Beliy Yar and Seversk.

== Station building ==
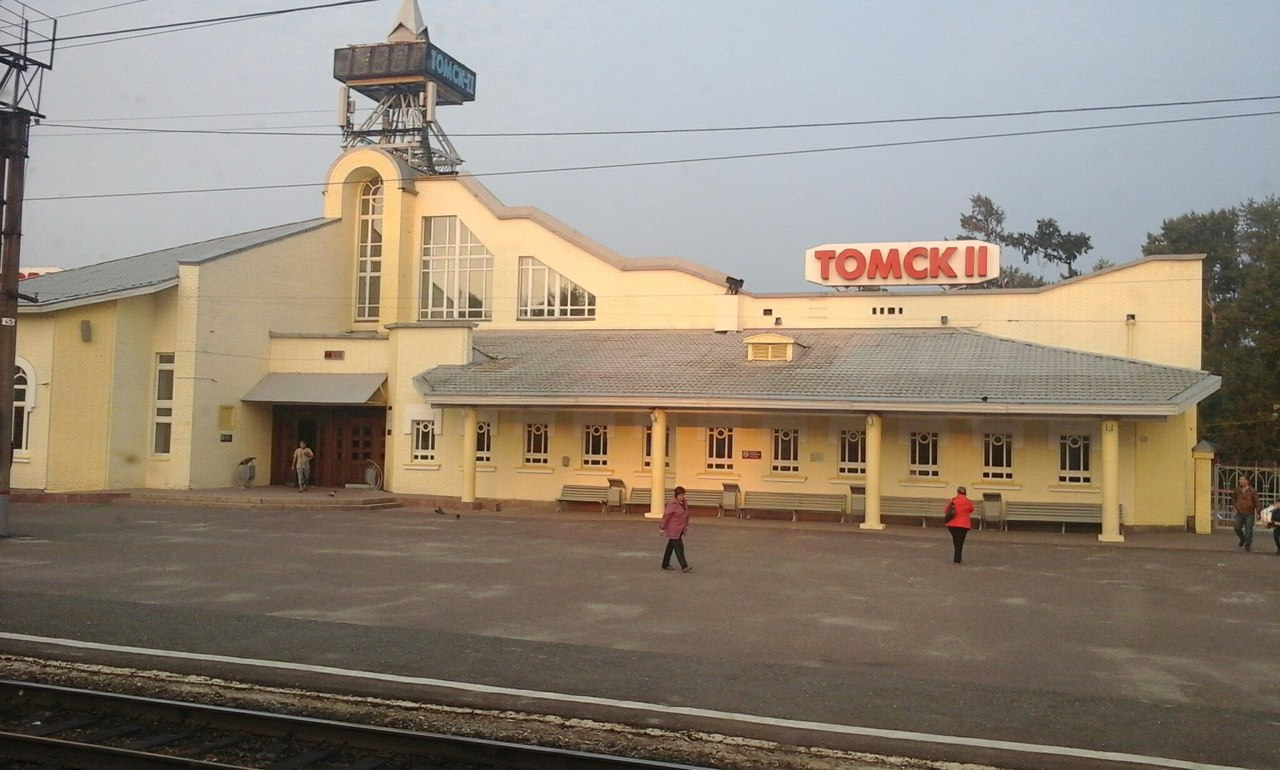
The Tomsk-2 railway station, 2016

The first station building was wooden and in 1997 a new building was open.

== Trains ==
Only 6 trains terminate at the station:

- Tomsk — Moscow
- Tomsk — Anapa
- Tomsk — Leninogorsk
- Tomsk — Novokuznetsk
- Tomsk — Tayga
- Bely Yar — Tomsk-2
