= Tayga =

Tayga Тайга
- Town
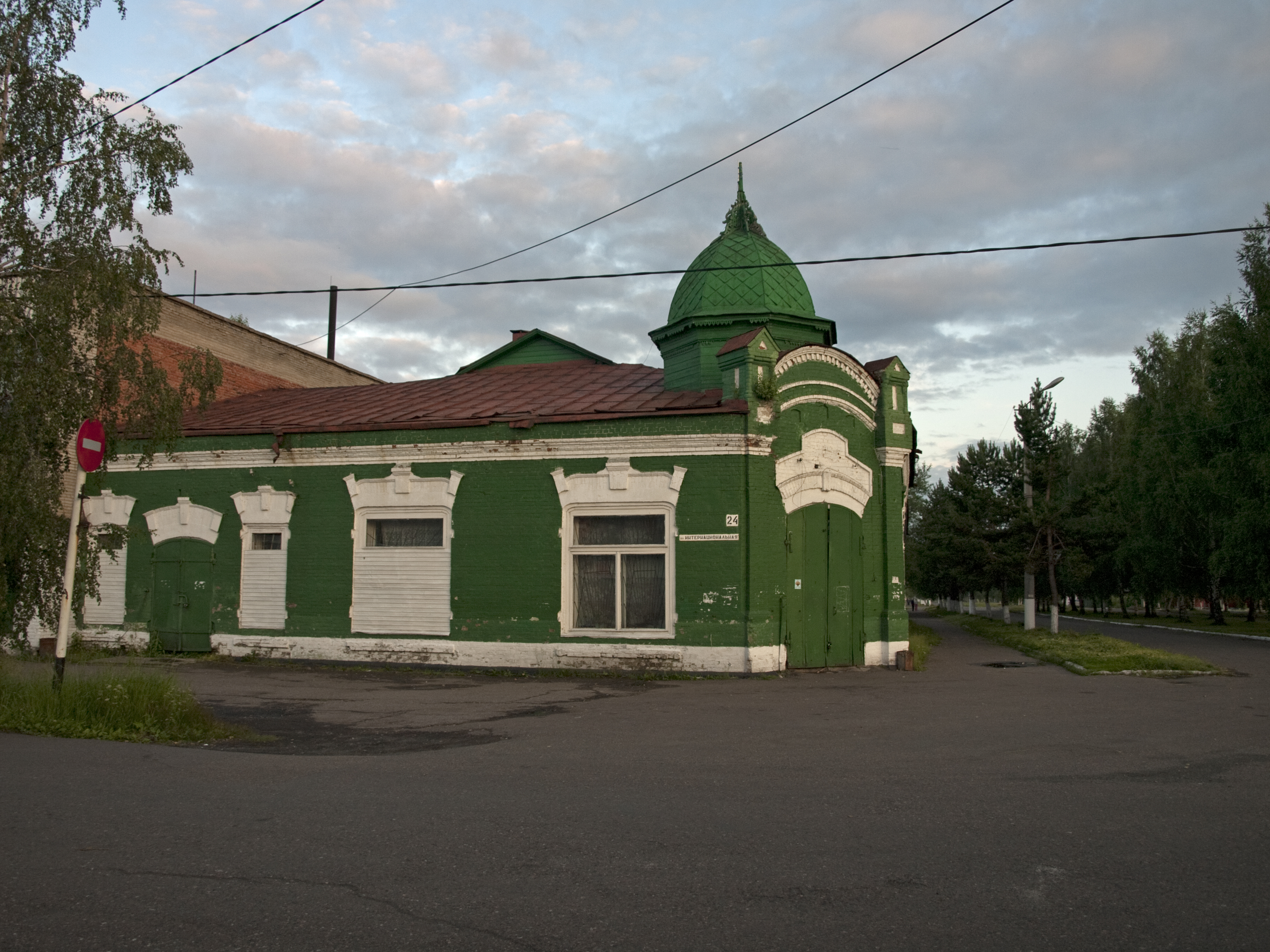
- The former shop of Merchant Magazov (1906, architect Lygin)

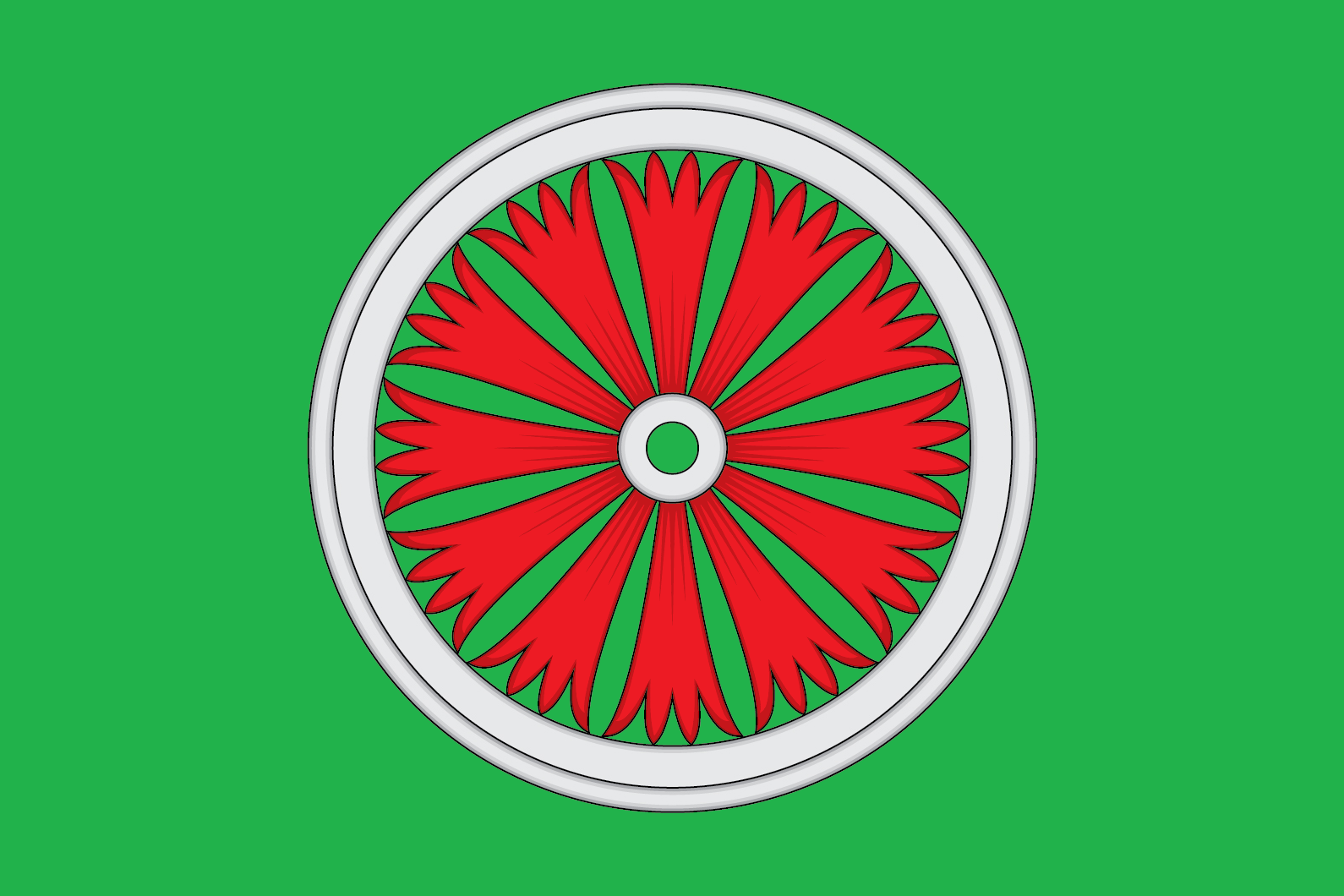
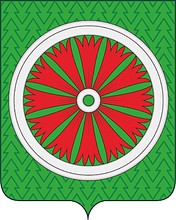
- Flag Coat of arms
- Interactive map of Tayga
- Location of Tayga Tayga (Kemerovo Oblast)
- Coordinates: 56°04′N 85°37′E
- Country: Russia
- Federal subject: Kemerovo Oblast
- Founded: end of the 19th century
- Town status since: 1911

Population (2010 Census)
  - Total: 25,331
  - Estimate (2025): 21,717 (−14.3%)

Administrative status
  - Subordinated to: Tayga Town Under Oblast Jurisdiction
  - Capital of: Tayga Town Under Oblast Jurisdiction

Municipal status
  - Urban okrug: Tayginsky Urban Okrug
  - Capital of: Tayginsky Urban Okrug
- Time zone: UTC+7 (MSK+4)
- Postal codes: 652400, 652401
- OKTMO ID: 32740000001

Tayga or Taiga (Russian: Тайга́) is a town in Kemerovo Oblast, Russia, located 118 kilometers (73 mi) northwest of Kemerovo. Population: 25,331 (2010 census); 24,726 (2002 census); 26,233 (1989 Soviet census).

The town is one of the biggest railway junctions in Russia.

== Geography ==
The town is a railroad junction on Trans-Siberian Railway, and also the starting point of the Tayga–Bely Yar branch of the Western Siberian Railway, which provides access to Tomsk.

== History ==
Tayga was founded in the end of the 19th century due to the construction of the Trans-Siberian Railway. The station was opened in 1898. In 1911, Tayga was granted town status.

== Administrative and municipal status ==
Within the framework of administrative divisions, it is, together with five rural localities, incorporated as Tayga Town Under Oblast Jurisdiction—an administrative unit with the status equal to that of the districts. As a municipal division, Tayga Town Under Oblast Jurisdiction is incorporated as Tayginsky Urban Okrug.

== Culture and recreation ==
Tayga contains ten objects classified as cultural and historical heritage of local significance. Five of them are monuments of architecture, and the other five are monuments of history.

=== Monuments of architecture ===
Monument ID	Protection level	Ensemble	Monument	Location	Photo	Notes
4200000294	Local	-	Merchant Magazov shop Лавка купца И. Магазова	24 Internatsionalnaya Street		
4200233000	Local	-	Tayga railway station building Здание железнодорожного вокзала	Railway station		
4200234000	Local	-	Tayga Church; Церковь	Internatsionalnaya Street		
4200235000, same as 4200236000	Local	-	Tayga water tower Водонапорная башня	Kirova Street, the railway depot		
4200237000	Local	-	Residential house Жилой дом	34 Proletarskaya Street		

=== Monuments of history ===
Monument ID	Protection level	Ensemble	Monument	Location	Photo	Notes
4200000064	Local	-	Monument to Sergey Kirov; Памятник С. М. Кирову	Next to the railway depot		
4200000295	Local	-	Steam engine P36-0192; Паровоз "П36-0192"-памятник революционной, боевой, трудовой славы железнодорожников станции Тайга	Next to the railway depot		
4200000296	Local	-	A tomb of three seamen executed by shooting Братская могила трех расстрелянных матросов	500 m (1,600 ft) from the last houses on Sovkhoznaya Street		
4200000297	Local	-	Monument to victims of political repressions Памятник жертвам политических репрессий	13 Kirova Avenue		
4200232000	Local	-	Building of the railway depot Здание локомотивного депо, где выступал видный партийный деятель С. М. Киров	Tayga railway station		
