= West Siberian Railway =

Railway in Russia

West Siberian Railway Западно-Сибирская железная дорога
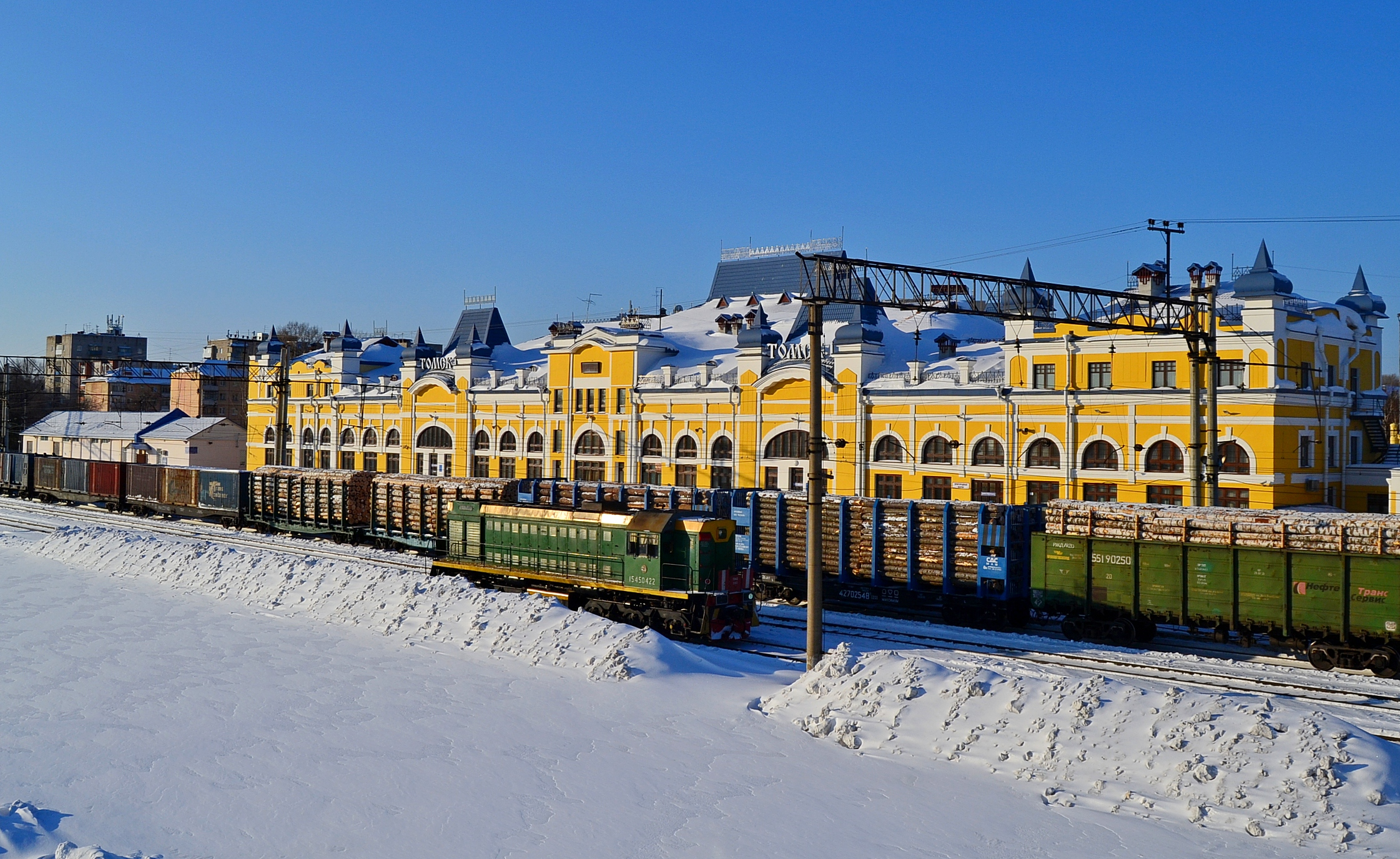
- Tomsk-1 Railway station in Tomsk

Overview
- Headquarters: Novosibirsk
- Locale: Siberia, Russian Federation
- Dates of operation: 1961–present

Technical
- Track gauge: 1,520 mm (4 ft 11 27/32 in)
- Length: 3,275 km (2,030 mi)

Other
- Website: Press here

West Siberian Railway (Russian: Западно-Сибирская железная дорога, Zapadno-Sibirskaya zheleznaya doroga) is a Rail operator of Russian Railways and part of the Great Trans-Siberian Railway crossing the Omsk, Novosibirsk, Kemerovo, Tomsk, and Altai regions of the Russian Federation as well as a portion of Kazakhstan.

== Main information ==
The company is headquartered in Novosibirsk and operated by the Russian Railways. The mainline was built between 1892 and 1896 by the Russian imperial government under Sergei Witte. Its railway route length exceeds 6000 km. The Turkestan–Siberia Railway branches off from Barnaul to the south, connecting Siberia to Central Asia. The network has 63,363 employees (as of 2009). Its subdivisions are headquartered in Omsk, Novosibirsk, Kemerovo, and Barnaul.

== History ==
The road was built in the period 1892–1896 at the expense of the Treasury. Main line: Chelyabinsk – Kurgan (1893), Kurgan – Omsk (1894), Omsk – Ob River (1895). Took place on the territory of Orenburg, Tobolsk, Tomsk, Irkutsk provinces of Akmolinsk region. In 1899 the railway had the length of 1408 km. It was under the jurisdiction of the Ministry of Railways of Russia, the railway administration was in Chelyabinsk. January 1, 1900, together with the Central Siberian railway became part of the Siberian railway.

In 1913 included with Siberian railway dedicated Omsk railway. In 1915, during the liquidation of the Siberian railway was formed Tomsk Railway. In accordance with the order of the Ministry of Railways of USSR No.424 March 3, 1934 part of Tomsk Railway passed to the composition formed in the East Siberian Railway.

October 20, 1940 on the basis of the Order of the Ministry of Railways of USSR No.267 from the composition of the Omsk Railway dedicated Karaganda Railway (Akmolinsk). May 9, 1961 in accordance with the Decree of the USSR Council of Ministers No. 406 dated 06.05.1961 G. Omsk and Tomsk railways in the United West-Siberian railway. January 17, 1979 in accordance with the Decree of the Council of Ministers of USSR No. 1091 of 28.12.1978 G. from part dedicated the Kemerovo Railway, which in 1996 joined back. October 1, 2003, the road became part of Russian Railways company. The management building was built in 1936.

Recipient of the Order of Lenin.
