= Russian Railways 353/354 =

353/354
Overview
- Service type: International train
- Status: Operating
- First service: October 2004
- Current operator: RZD

Route
- Stops: Ulan Ude, Chita
- Average journey time: 37 hrs 15 mins（Irkutsk-Manzhouli） 32 hrs 56 mins（Manzhouli-Irkutsk） 15 hrs 40 mins（Chita-Manzhouli） 12 hrs 51 mins（Manzhouli-Chita）
- Train number: 353/354

On-board services
- Class: Kupe
- Sleeping arrangements: Yes

Technical
- Rolling stock: Type 61-4440 coaches
- Track gauge: 1,520 mm (4 ft 11 27/32 in)
- Electrification: 25 kV 50 Hz

Train 353/354 is an international passenger train operated by Russian Railways between Irkutsk, the capital of Irkutsk Oblast, and Chita, the capital of Transbaikal Krai, within Russia, and Manzhouli, a border city in the Inner Mongolia Autonomous Region, China. The cross-border section began operation in October 2004. The train uses Russian-made passenger cars marked "МЕСТ" (Russian, pronounced /mʲest/, meaning "capacity"), and runs along the Trans-Siberian Railway and the Harbin-Manzhouli Railway.

- The Irkutsk-Manzhouli route departs from Irkutsk Passenger Station every Friday and Monday, with a travel time of 37 hours and 15 minutes, arriving at Manzhouli Station every Sunday and Wednesday. This is train number 354.
- The Manzhouli-Irkutsk route departs from Manzhouli Station every Wednesday and Sunday, arriving at Irkutsk Passenger Station every Thursday and Monday, with a travel time of 32 hours and 56 minutes. This is train number 353.
- The Chita-Manzhouli route departs from Chita Station No. 2 every Saturday and Tuesday, with a travel time of 15 hours and 40 minutes, arriving at Manzhouli Station every Sunday and Wednesday. This is train number 354.
- The Manzhouli-Chita route departs from Manzhouli Station every Wednesday and Sunday, arriving at Chita Station No. 2 every Thursday and Monday, with a travel time of 12 hours and 51 minutes. This is train number 353.

== Operational History ==
In October 2004, according to an agreement reached between China Railway Harbin Railway Bureau and Russia Zabaikalsk Railway Bureau, international through passenger train No. 654 departed from Chita No. 2 Station every Thursday and Saturday, arriving at Manzhouli Station every Friday and Sunday, and returned on the same day as train No. 653, arriving at Chita No. 2 Station every Saturday and Monday. Russian Railways was responsible for the locomotives and the hard sleeper carriages.

On February 5, 2020, train services were suspended in order to cooperate with the prevention and control work related to the COVID-19 pandemic.

On February 18, 2026, Russian Railways announced the resumption of cross-border passenger rail service between Manzhouli and Zabaikalsk, effective March 8, 2026. The new train numbers are 353/354. The Irkutsk-Manzhouli train, departing from Irkutsk as part of the 328/327 Irkutsk-Zabaikalsk train service, will run every Friday and Monday, arriving and returning every Sunday and Wednesday, starting March 6, 2026. The Chita-Manzhouli train, departing from Chita as part of the 328/327 Irkutsk-Zabaikalsk train service, will run every Saturday and Tuesday, arriving and returning every Sunday and Wednesday, starting March 7, 2026.

== Coach formation ==
The passenger cars used on trains 327/328 were manufactured by the Tver Rolling Stock Plant in Russia and were purchased by Russian Railways as 61-4440 type railway passenger cars. The third-class sleeper cars had 9 compartments, each with 2 upper and lower berths, and 8 upper and lower berths were set up parallel to the corridor, with a capacity of 54 people. The car body was marked МЕСТ-54. The ordinary hard sleeper cars had 9 four-person compartments, with a capacity of 36 people. The car body was marked МЕСТ-36. The hard sleeper cars for disabled persons had 6 four-person compartments and 1 double compartment, and also included a broadcasting room and a toilet for disabled persons. The capacity was 26 people. The car body was marked МЕСТ-26. The entire train was fully enclosed. Each car was equipped with a closed-circuit television system, a shower room, a telephone, and an automatic fire alarm system.[4] The passenger cars used on trains 353/354 were manufactured by the former East German DWA Amendov plant and purchased by Russian Railways. These are international transport-specific passenger cars (similar to the CR Type 18 passenger car). The standard hard sleeper cars consist of nine four-person compartments, marked МЕСТ-36 (Russian, pronounced /mʲest/, meaning "capacity 36 people").

Within Russia, the train is attached to trains 328/327 (Irkutsk-Zabaikalsk), sharing their timetable. Hard sleeper car number 18 is added from Irkutsk, and hard sleeper car number 20 is added from Chita. These two cars are then detached from train 328 in Zabaikalsk and continue into China. On the return trip, the train departs from Manzhouli, is attached to train 327 in Zabaikalsk, and car number 20 is detached in Chita. Car number 18 remains with the train until its final destination in Irkutsk.

Since the Manzhouli Station passenger yard does not have a 1520 mm gauge broad gauge line, the train needs to have its bogies changed at the Transbaikalsk Station.

Section	Zabaykalsk↔Irkutsk Pass.			Manzhouli↔Irkutsk Pass.	Manzhouli↔Chita 2
Number	5-9	10	11-13	18	20
Rolling stock	61-4440 Platzkart МЕСТ-54 54 pax	61-4440 Kupe МЕСТ-26 26 pax	61-4440 Kupe МЕСТ-36 36 pax	61-4440; Kupe МЕСТ-36 36 pax	

== Loco shift ==
Section	Manzhouli↔Zabaykalsk
Shift	TEM18 RZD Zabaykalsk RZD driver

== Schedule ==
- As of 6 March 2026
- No time difference between Irkutsk Oblast and China, 1 hour ahead for Zabaykalsky Krai

328/354				Stops	327/353			
Train no.	Day	Arrival	Departure	Stops	Arrival	Departure	Day	Train no.
328	D1	—	21:45	Irkutsk	22:56	—	D2	327
328	D1	22:08	22:10	Goncharovo	22:32	22:34	D2	327
328	D2	00:29	00:31	Slydyanka-1	20:11	20:13	D2	327
328	D2	01:13	01:15	Baykalsk	19:21	19:23	D2	327
328	D2	01:45	01:47	Vydrino	18:49	18:51	D2	327
328	—	↓	↓	Tankhoi	18:15	18:17	D2	327
328	D2	03:06	03:08	Mysovaya	17:18	17:20	D2	327
328	D2	04:08	04:10	Timlyuy	16:12	16:14	D2	327
328	D2	04:27	04:29	Selenginsk	15:51	15:53	D2	327
328	—	↓	↓	Tataurovo	15:18	17:20	D2	327
328	D2	05:50	06:20	Ulan Ude Pass.	14:12	14:41	D2	327
328	—	↓	↓	Zaudinsk	13:54	13:57	D2	327
328	D2	07:31	07:34	Zaigraevo	13:08	13:12	D2	327
328	D2	08:09	08:12	Novoilinski	12:35	12:37	D2	327
↑ Russia（Irkutsk Time UTC+08:00） / Russia（Yakutsk Time UTC+09:00） ↓
328	D2	09:59	10:03	Petrovsky Zavod	12:37	12:41	D2	327
328	D2	12:58	13:39	Khilok	09:29	09:44	D2	327
328	D2	14:28	14:30	Kushenga	08:45	08:47	D2	327
328	D2	14:51	14:53	Kharagun	08:22	08:24	D2	327
328	D2	18:36	20:20	Chita-2	03:51	04:27	D2	327
328	D2	22:20	23:14	Karymskaya	01:37	01:55	D2	327
328	D3	01:03	01:18	Mogoytuy	00:04	00:09	D2	327
328	D3	02:37	03:15	Olovyannaya	22:48	22:53	D1	327
328	D3	03:33	03:43	Yasnogorsk	22:26	22:31	D1	327
328	D3	05:25	05:49	Borzya	20:46	21:08	D1	327
328/354	D3	07:46	11:35	Zabaykalsk	15:25	18:52	D1	353/327
↑ Russia（Yakutsk Time UTC+09:00） / China（CST UTC+08:00） ↓
354	D3	11:00	—	Manzhouli	—	14:00	D1	353

== See also ==
- China Railway K3/4
- Vostok (Russian train)
- Suifenhe-Grodekovo shuttle train
