= Vostok (Russian train) =

International passenger train service in Russia and China

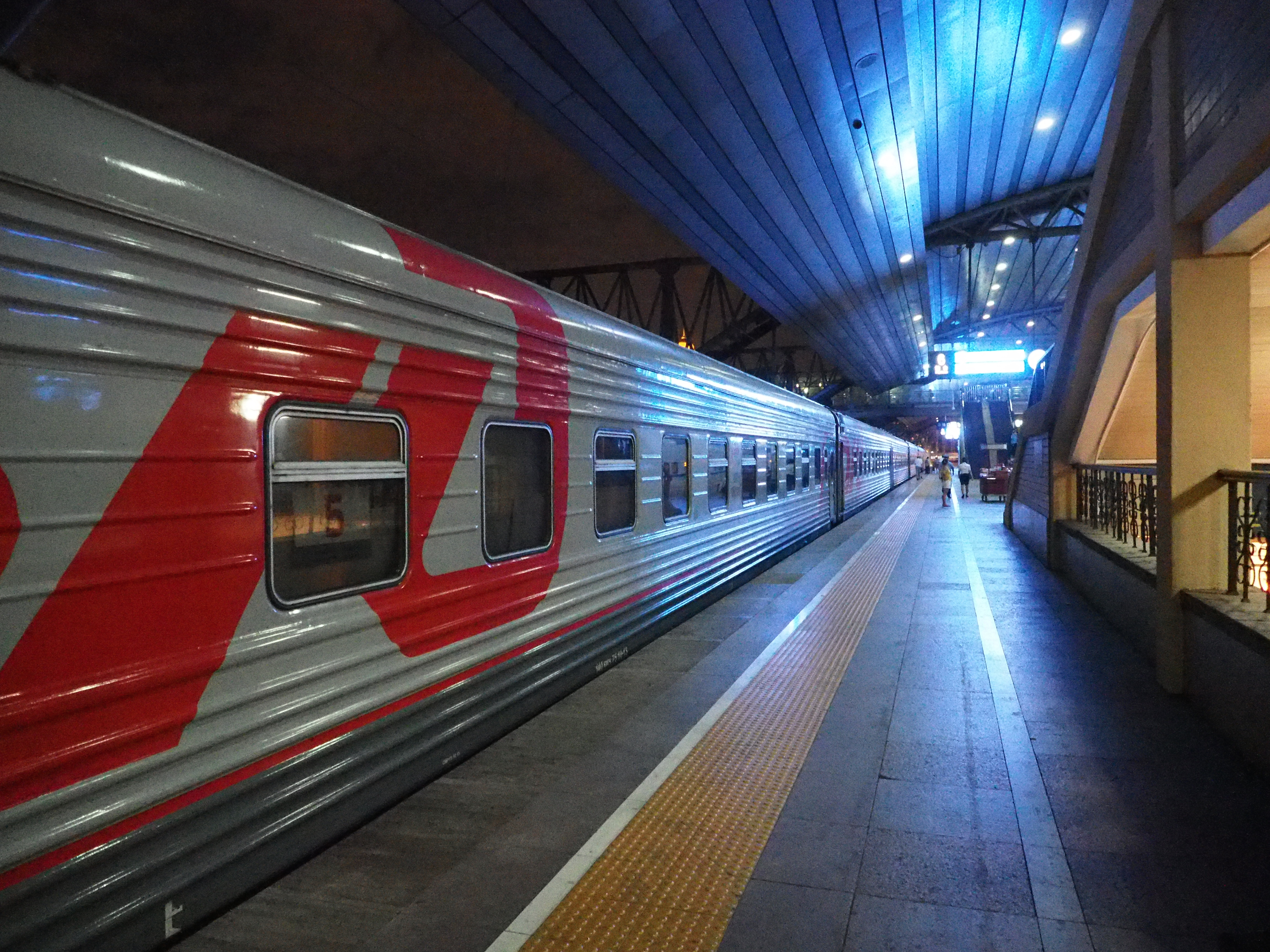
- K19 in Beijing

Overview
- First service: 31 January 1954
- Last service: 5 February 2020 (suspended)
- Current operator: RZD Moscow

Route
- Termini: Moscow Yaroslavl; Beijing
- Average journey time: 139h 58m (K19), 144h 54m (K20)
- Train numbers: 061М/062М (Moscow↔Chita), 319Ч/320Ч (Chita↔Zabaikalsk), K19/20 (China)

On-board services
- Classes: Premium kupe, Platzkart
- Sleeping arrangements: Yes
- Catering facilities: Yes

Technical
- Rolling stock: Type 61-4440 coaches
- Track gauge: 1,435 mm (Standard), 1,520 mm (Russian gauge)
- Electrification: 25 kv 50 Hz DC 3000 V

019/020 Vostok (Russian: Восток) is an international train operated by RZD Moscow which runs between Moscow Yaroslavl and Beijing. The train number is 019Ч/020Щ in Russia and K19/20 in China. It commenced operations on 31 January 1954. The train is operated by RZD Moscow.

The journey of the train lasts for 144 hrs 54 mins from Moscow and 139 hrs 58 mins from Beijing, which runs a distance of 8986 km. From these statistics, it held the longest international train record until 2020, which the Moscow-Pyongyang train broke with 10,267 km (208 hrs 25 mins).

== History ==
On 1 May 1949, train 1/2 from Peiping to Mukden South commenced operations under CR Tientsin, and the train extended to Manzhouli on 1 November, which 7 coaches are operated by CR Tsitsihar. China and Soviet Union agreed in 1950 to operate an international train, and it commenced operations in 1951, though the same ticket is issued but passengers should buy separate tickets for China and Soviet sections and change trains at Manzhouli.

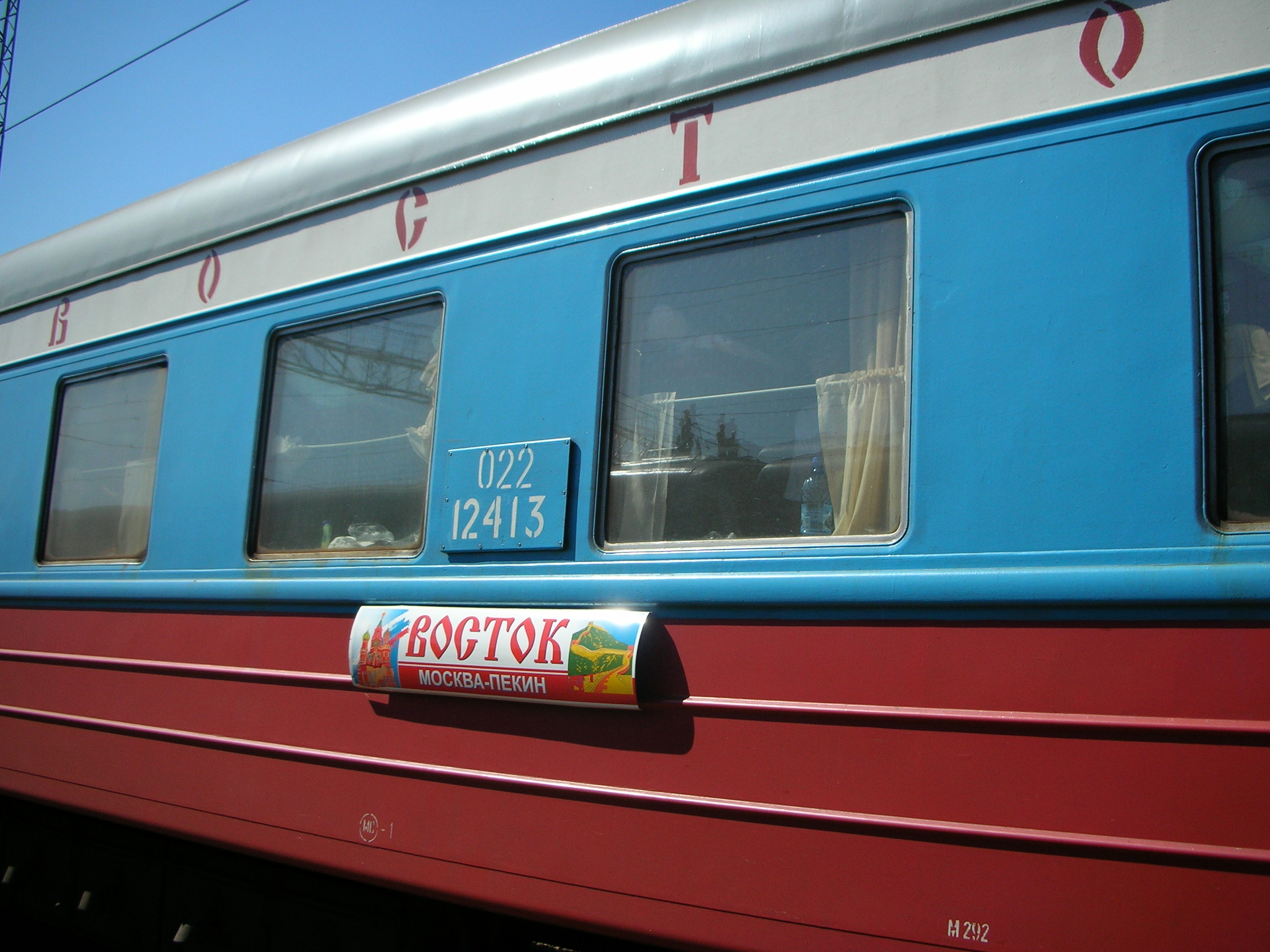
Vostok coach before 2008

An agreement was signed in 1953 between China and Soviet Railways in Moscow to commence operations for a direct through train. To prepare for the train service, about 200 related personnel participated in the training at Harbin. On 7 December, trial operations for the train from Moscow-Beijing.

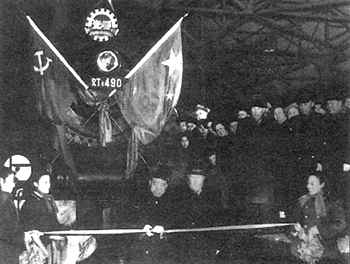
Commencement of direct through train in 1954

On 31 January 1954, Beijing-Moscow through train commenced operations, the train service is operated by Soviet Union, and the train number continued the Beijing-Manzhouli 1/2, the frequency increased from two trains per week to three. The travel time and distance are 214 hrs and 9050 km respectively, becoming the longest international train by travel distance.

Due to Sino-Soviet split and rescheduling in China, the train number changed from 1/2 to 19/20 in China and 17/18 in Soviet Union, the route was reduced to one train per week. The train continued to be operated by Soviet Railways and attached 2 hard sleepers, canteen and postal coaches from CR Beijing. In 1983, the train number was unified as 19/20. In 1989, Soviet Railways commenced a second 19/20 train and attached an additional coach for Moscow-Shenyang between 1992 and 1996.

After the dissolution of the Soviet Union, the operations were transferred to RZD. During the third acceleration campaign in 2000, the train was elevated to K19/20 fast train. In 2008, all coaches are refurbished and German-made coaches were phased out.

From 9 July 2020, RZD rescheduled Vostok to attach coaches of 062М/061М to Vladivostok, and use the same train number between Moscow and Chita, while the Zabaikalsk section as 320Ч/319Ч and Chinese section as K20/19.

Due to COVID-19, all Vostok trains terminates service at Zaibaikalsk, non-Russian passengers are refused entry and the train will directly transported back to Moscow. Vostok services were suspended on 5 February 2020.

== Train composition ==
Type 61-4440 coaches for K19/20 are manufactured by Tver, composing of 4 passengers compartments platzkart (3rd class), accessible-friendly 4 passengers compartment and a 2 passengers compartment platzkart with broadcast compartment and accessible lavatory, the premium kupe (2nd class) have 9 compartment for 2 passengers and all coaches are installed with surveillance systems, bathrooms, telephone and fire alert systems. The aforementioned coaches are commenced from 2018 and are closed-circuits. As for Chinese section coaches are Type 18 canteen and platzkart.

There will be 18 coaches between Zabaikalsk and Moscow, which 13 platzkart (3rd), 3 premium kupe (2nd class), canteen and luggage 1 each, and will attach the CR canteen and platzkart coaches from Manzhouli to Beijing, thus there will be 18 coaches in Chinese section.

In addition, Vostok used to attach a premium kupe and platzkart to Pyongyang and change to K27/28. However, due to low ridership and technical issues, the coaches are rearranged to Rossiya and send by KSR.

Due to gauge differences, all trains must break of gauge at Zabaikalsk station, and passenger must clear immigration and wait for five hours.

Section	Coach	Type	Capacity	Class	Operator
Moscow–Zabaikalsk	18	61-4440; РЕСТОРАН		Canteen	RZD Moscow
Moscow–Zabaikalsk	19	61-4440		Platzkart	RZD Moscow
Moscow–Beijing	0	61-4440; МЕСТ-02; БАГАЖНЫИ	2 pax	Luggage	RZD Moscow
Moscow–Beijing	1–3	61-4440; МЕСТ-36	36 pax	Platzkart	RZD Moscow
Moscow–Beijing	4	61-4440; МЕСТ-26	26 pax	Platzkart	RZD Moscow
Moscow–Beijing	5–7	61-4440; МЕСТ-18	18 pax	Premium kupe	RZD Moscow
Moscow–Beijing	10–17	61-4440; МЕСТ-36	36 pax	Platzkart	RZD Moscow
Manzhouli–Beijing	8	CA18		Canteen	CR Beijing
Manzhouli–Beijing	9	YW18		Hard sleeper	CR Beijing

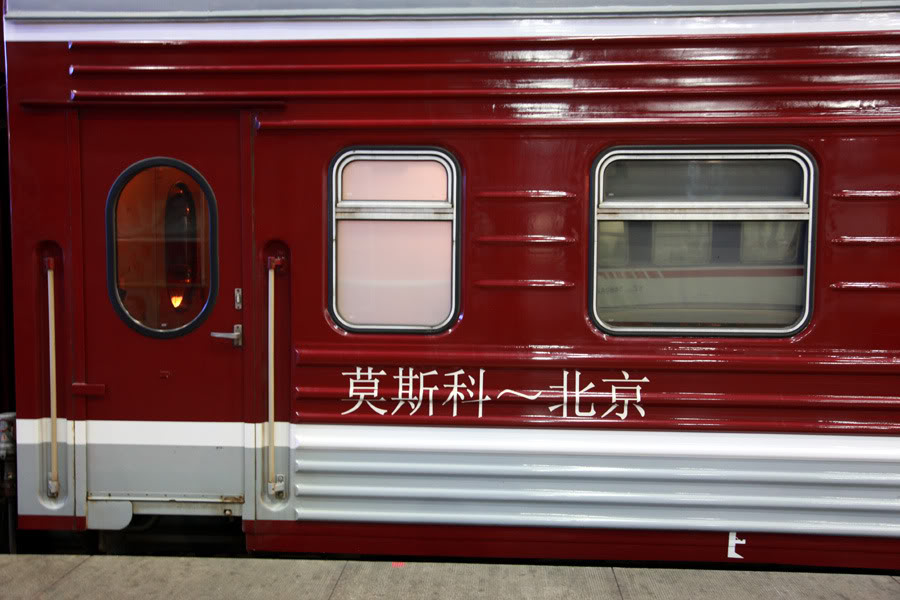
K19 coach

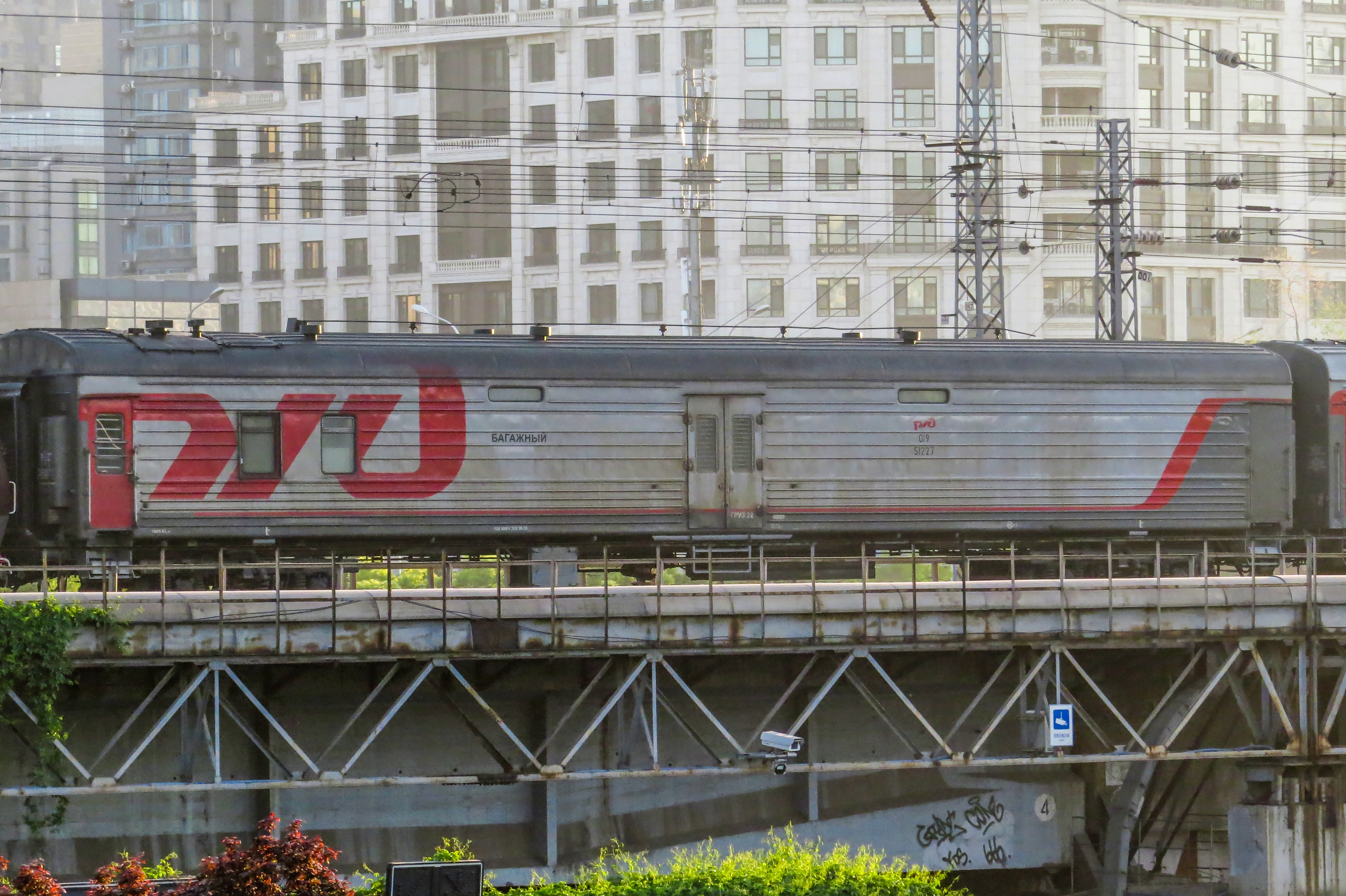
Luggage coach

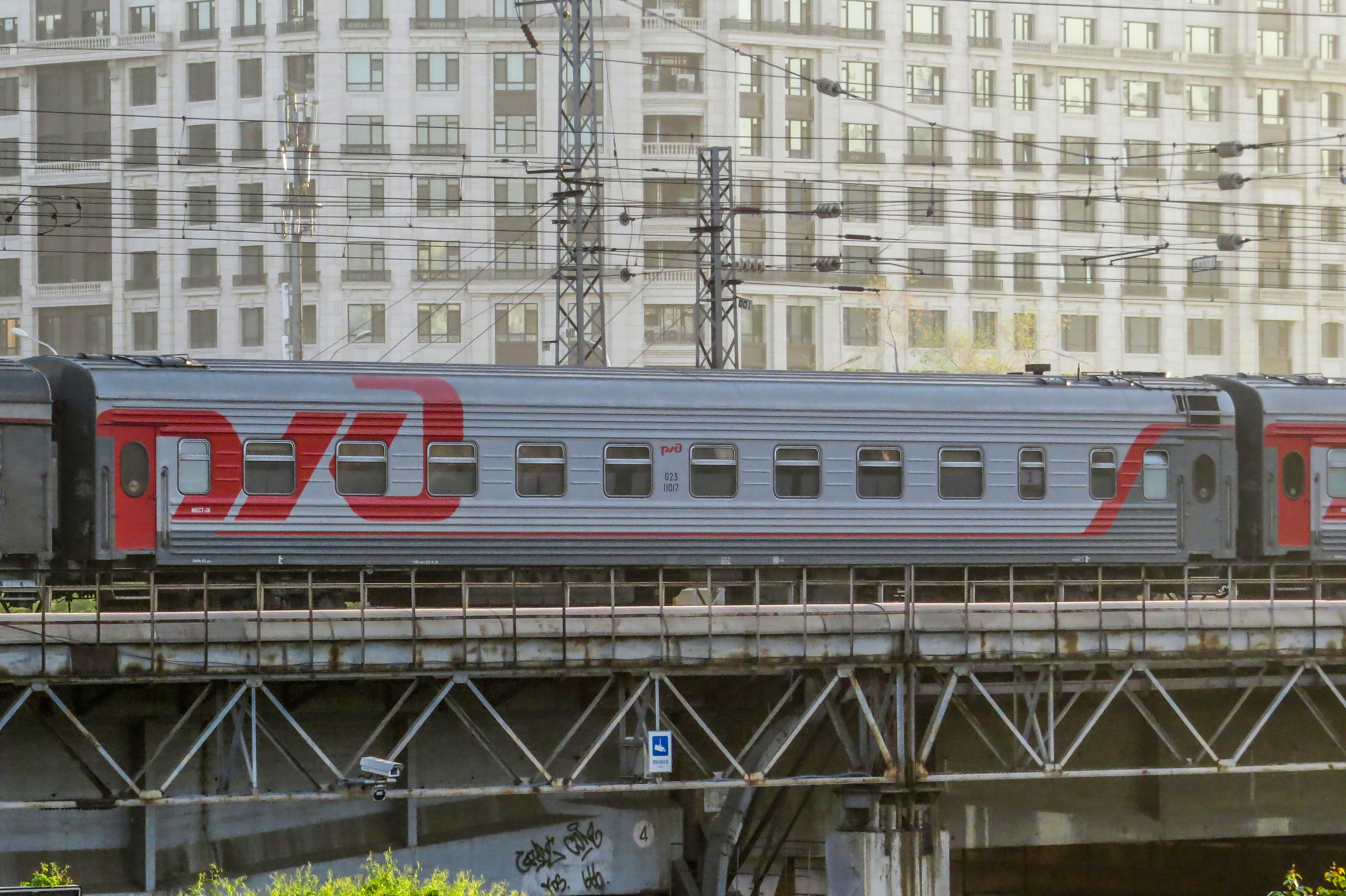
No. 1 Platzkart

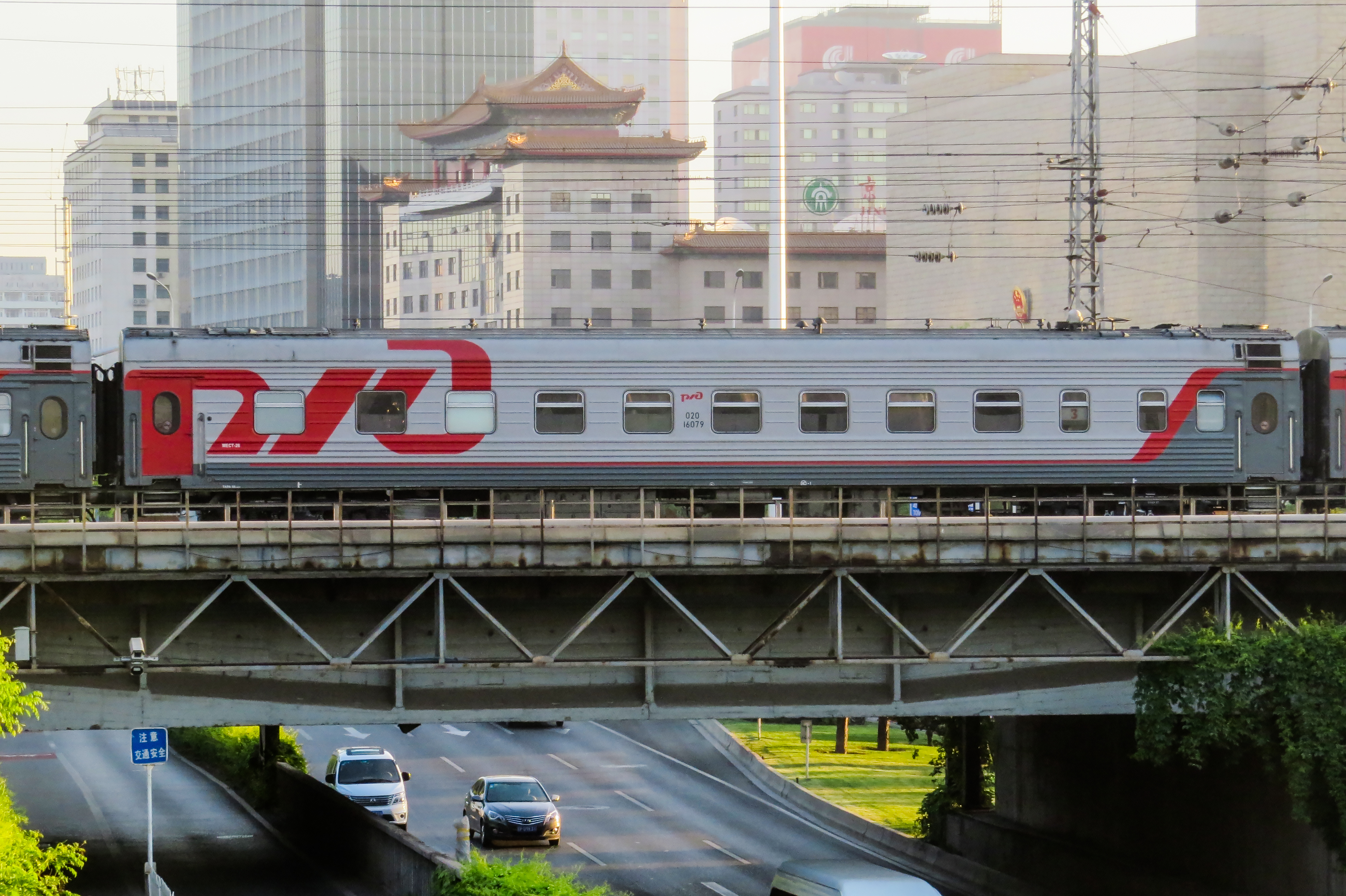
No. 3 Platzkart

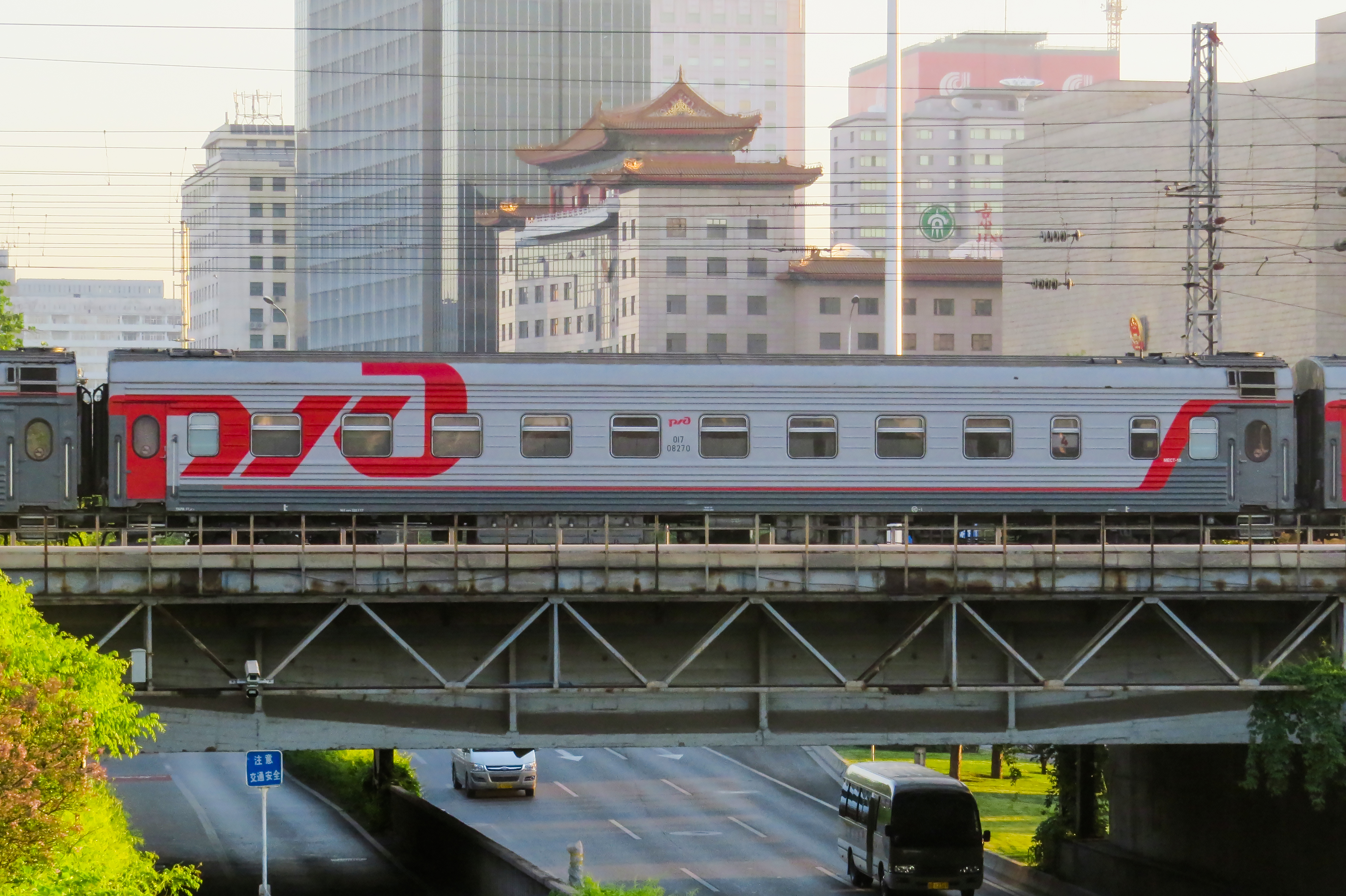
No. 4 Premium Kupe

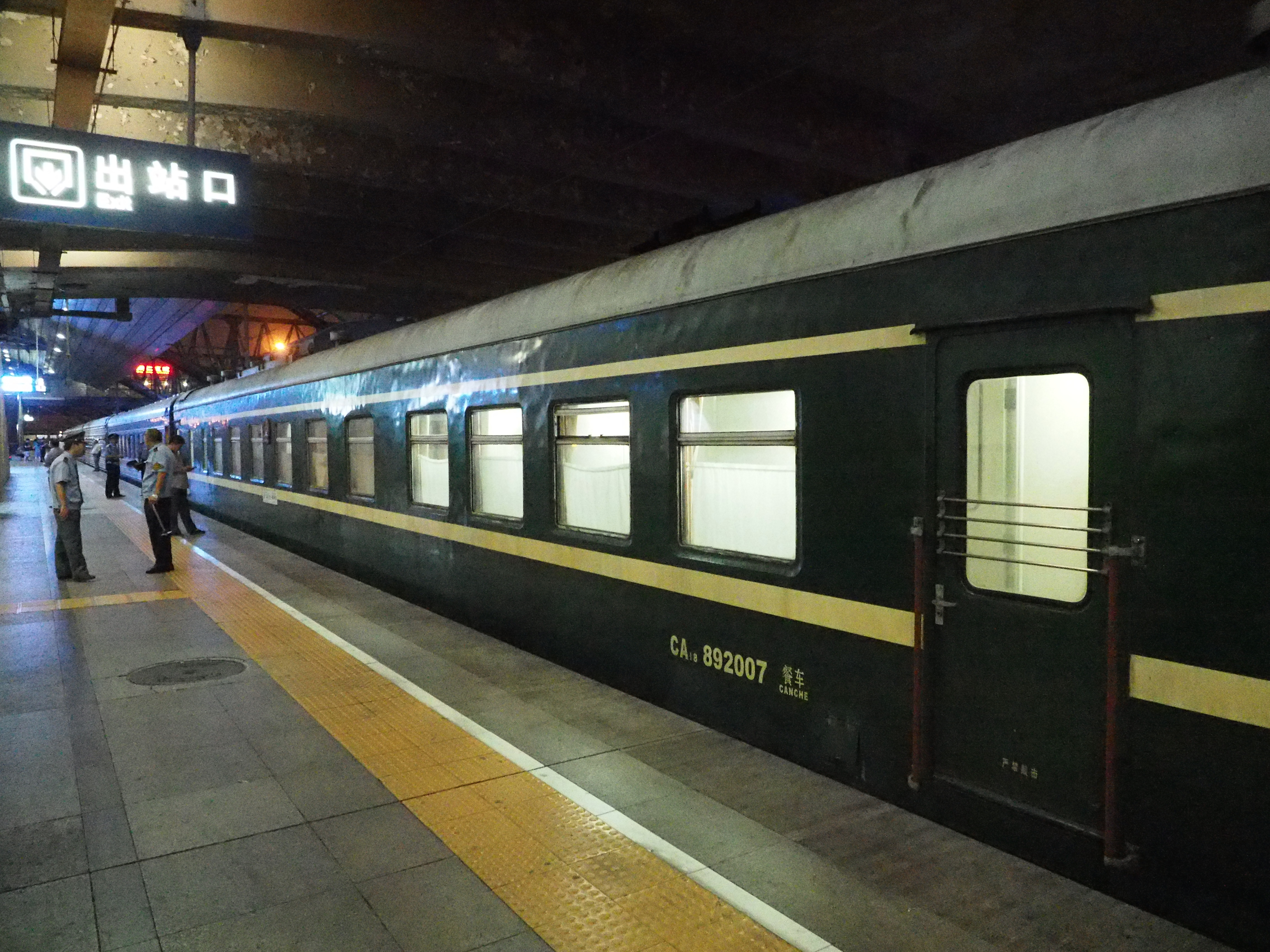
CA18 canteen coach attached to K19

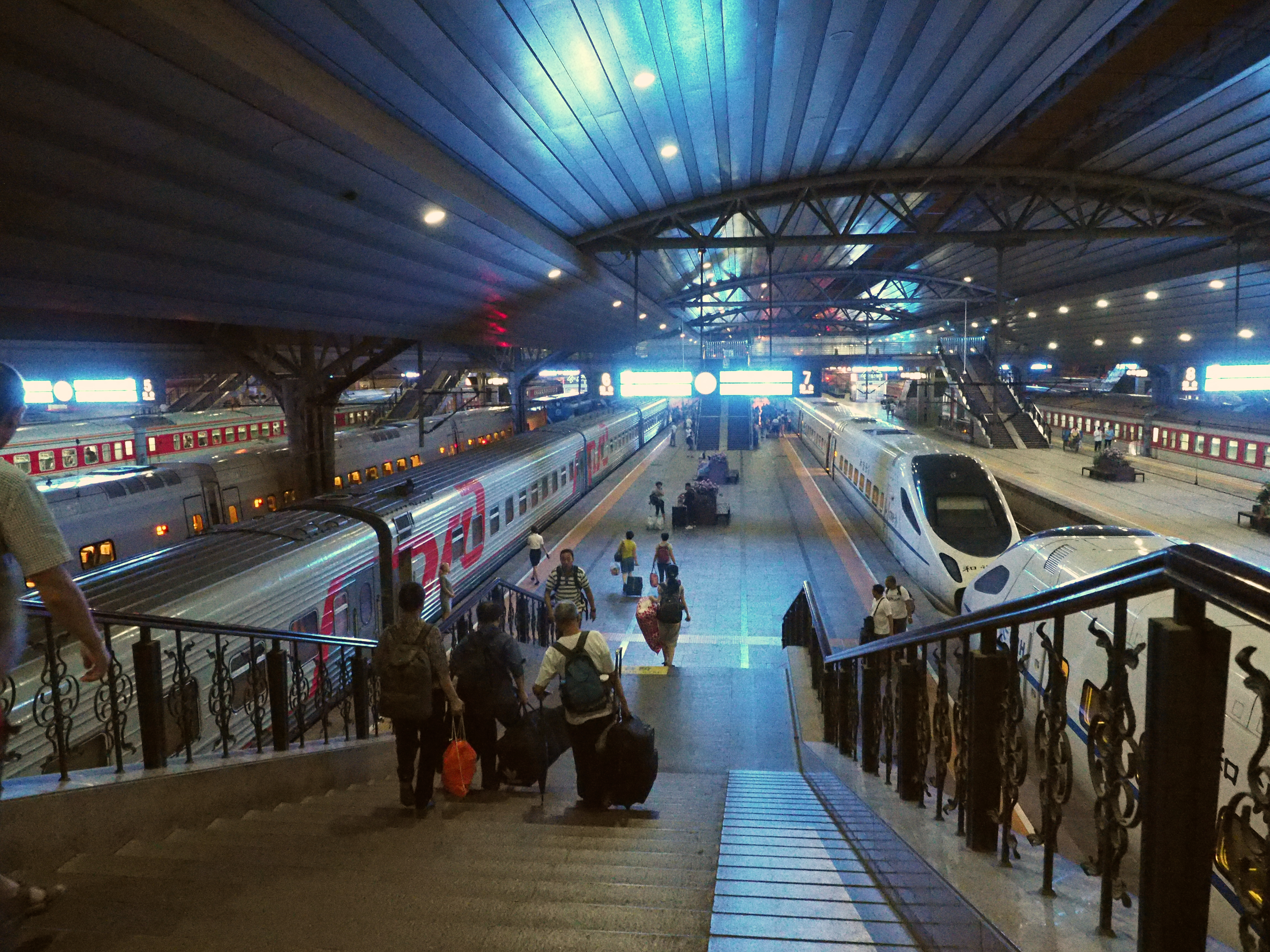
K19 at Beijing

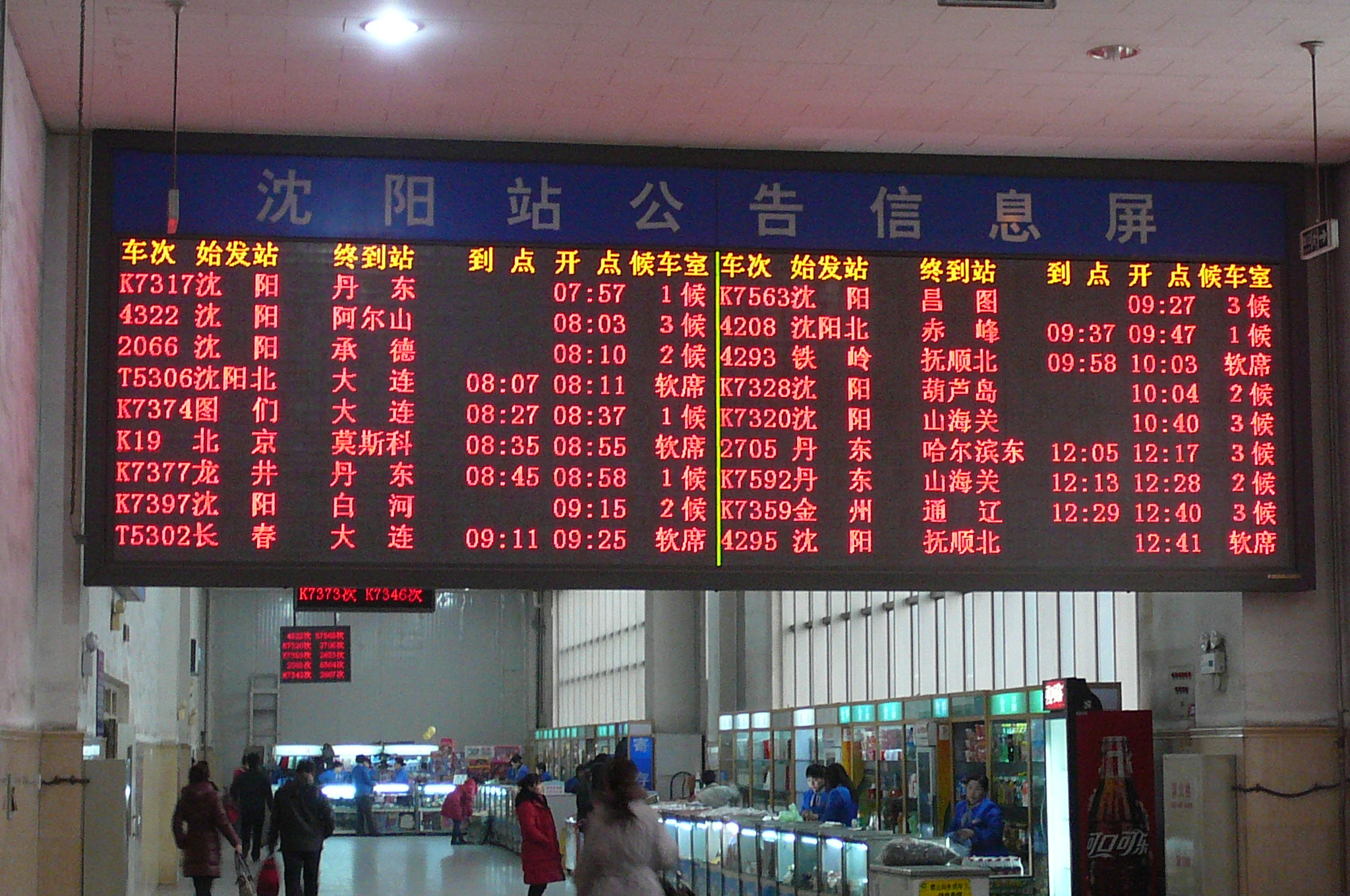
K19 on Timetable

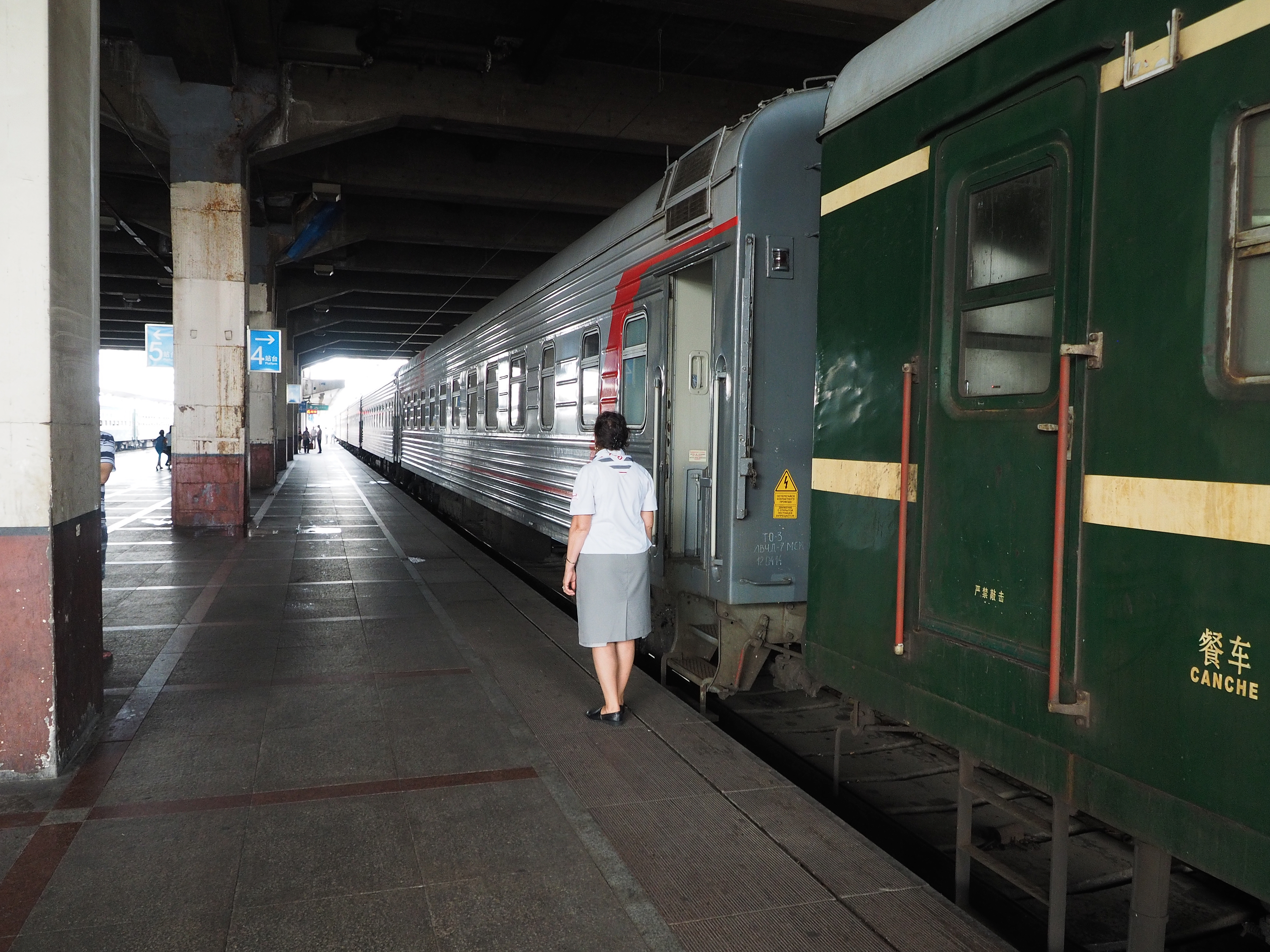
K19 calls at Harbin platform 4

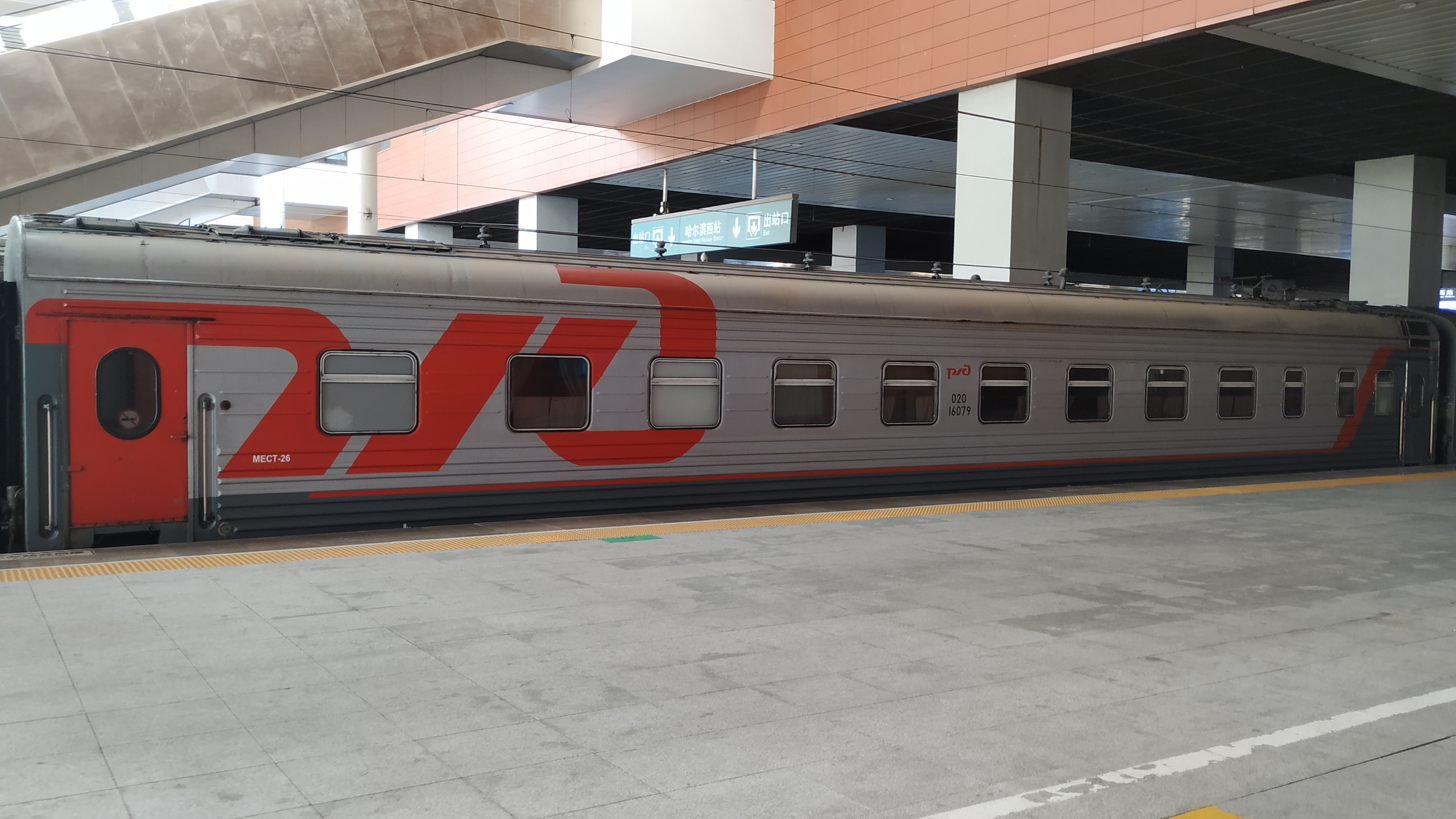
K19 calls at Harbin platform 18

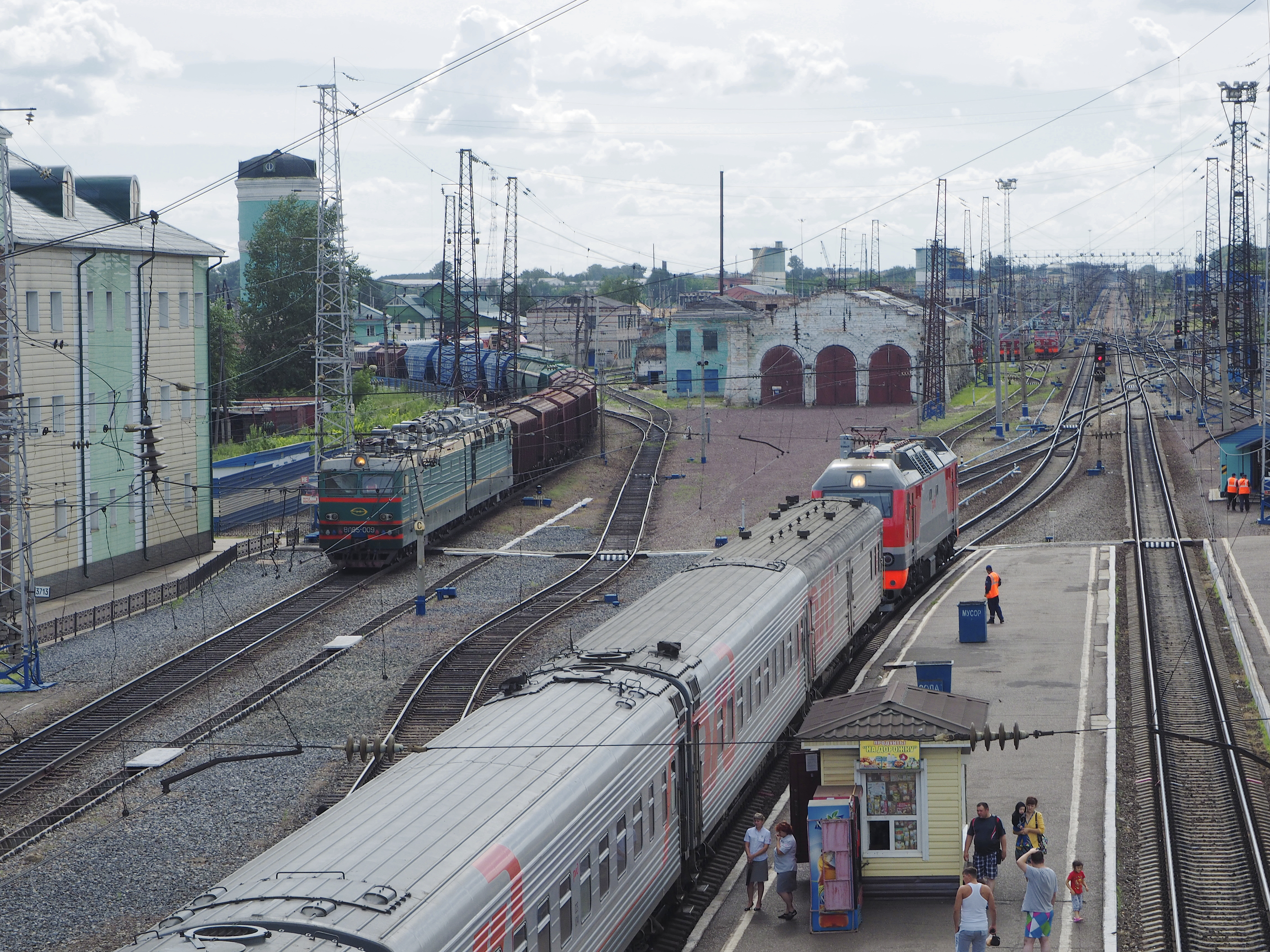
019 at Mariinsk

== Loco shift ==
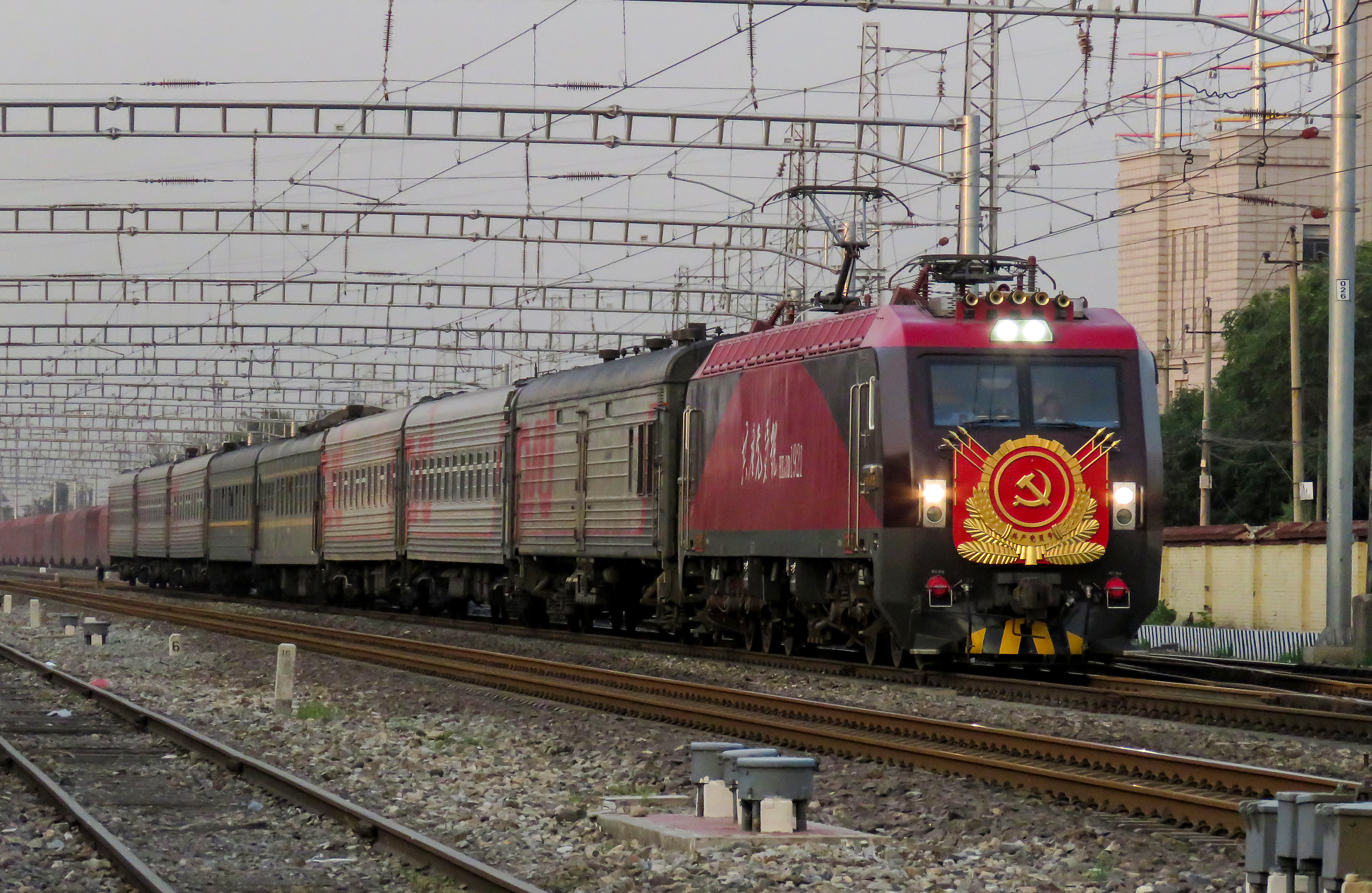
HXD3D "Communist" hauling K20

K19/20 is hauled by HXD3D "Tomato" loco from Beijing to Harbin, and will take shift at Shenyang station, then another HXD3D will take shift from Harbin to Manzhouli, for the Manzhouli-Zabaikalsk section will be hauled by HXN5 diesel loco.

In the Russian section, the train is hauled by TEP70BS from Zabaikalsk to Borzya, then will be hauled by EP1 or EP1P electric loco to Mariinsk and shift at Zima. From Mariinsk to Balezino, an EP2K loco will haul the train, then will change to ChS4T or EP1M loco to Vladimir, the final leg will be hauled by ChS7 or EP2K to Moscow. All shifts in Russia are taken by RZD drivers.

Section	Loco	Operator	Shift
Beijing–Harbin	HXD3D ("Communist")	CR Shenyang	Shift at Shenyang
Harbin–Manzhouli	HXD3D	CR Harbin	Harbin shift
Manzhouli–Zabaikalsk	HXN5	CR Harbin	Manzhouli shift
Zabaikalsk–Borzya	TEP70BS	RZD	RZD shift
Borzya–Zima	EP1	RZD	RZD shift
Zima–Mariinsk	EP1P	RZD	RZD shift
Mariinsk–Balezino	EP2K	RZD	RZD shift
Balezino–Vladimir	ChS4T; EP1M	RZD	RZD shift
Vladimir–Moscow	ChS7; EP2K	RZD	RZD shift

== Schedule ==
- 5-hour difference between China and Moscow

062М/320Ч/K20				Stops	K19/319Ч/061М			
Train no.	Day	Arrival	Departure	Stops	Departure	Arrival	Day	Train no.
062М	Day 1	—	23:45	Moscow	13:58	—	Day 7	061М
062М	Day 2	02:26	02:52	Vladimir	10:36	11:06	Day 7	061М
062М	Day 2	05:37	05:49	Nizhny Novgorod	06:48	07:00	Day 7	061М
062М	Day 2	06:39	06:41	Semyonov	05:44	05:46	Day 7	061М
062М	Day 2	11:55	12:10	Kirov	01:00	01:15	Day 7	061М
062М	Day 2	15:52	16:18	Balezino	21:21	21:47	Day 6	061М
062М	Day 2	19:42	20:02	Perm	17:28	17:48	Day 6	061М
062М	Day 3	01:12	01:40	Yekaterinburg	11:36	12:04	Day 6	061М
062М	Day 3	06:15	06:35	Tyumen	06:34	06:55	Day 6	061М
062М	Day 3	10:19	10:34	Ishim	02:50	03:05	Day 6	061М
062М	Day 3	13:44	14:00	Omsk	23:29	23:45	Day 5	061М
062М	Day 3	17:46	18:16	Barabinsk	19:18	19:48	Day 5	061М
062М	Day 3	21:28	21:46	Novosibirsk	15:39	15:57	Day 5	061М
062М	Day 3	23:57	23:59	Yurga	13:26	13:28	Day 5	061М
062М	Day 4	01:00	01:03	Taiga	12:23	12:25	Day 5	061М
062М	Day 4	03:12	03:46	Mariinsk	09:53	10:27	Day 5	061М
062М	Day 4	05:26	05:27	Bogotol	08:08	08:09	Day 5	061М
062М	Day 4	06:23	06:25	Achinsk	07:07	07:09	Day 5	061М
062М	Day 4	09:17	09:38	Krasnoyarsk	03:58	04:19	Day 5	061М
062М	Day 4	13:18	13:20	Kansk-Eniseiky	00:21	00:23	Day 5	061М
062М	Day 4	13:51	14:13	Ilanskaya	23:29	23:51	Day 4	061М
062М	Day 4	16:10	16:12	Tayshet	21:28	21:30	Day 4	061М
062М	Day 4	18:45	18:58	Nizhneudinsk	18:42	18:55	Day 4	061М
062М	Day 4	20:34	20:36	Tulun	17:03	17:05	Day 4	061М
062М	Day 4	22:31	22:53	Zima	14:48	15:10	Day 4	061М
062М	Day 5	00:37	00:39	Cheremkhovo	13:00	13:02	Day 4	061М
062М	Day 5	01:28	01:30	Sibirskoye	12:06	12:08	Day 4	061М
062М	Day 5	01:53	01:55	Angarsk	11:40	11:42	Day 4	061М
062М	Day 5	02:27	02:29	Irkutsk Sortirovochnaya	11:01	11:03	Day 4	061М
062М	Day 5	02:43	03:06	Irkutsk	10:23	10:47	Day 4	061М
062М	Day 5	05:33	05:35	Slyudyanka	08:17	08:19	Day 4	061М
062М	Day 5	09:58	10:19	Ulan-Ude	03:02	03:23	Day 4	061М
062М	Day 5	12:22	12:24	Petrovsky Zavod	01:03	01:05	Day 4	061М
062М	Day 5	14:51	15:12	Khilok	22:20	22:35	Day 3	061М
062М/320Ч	Day 5	19:15	20:27	Chita	16:43	17:56	Day 3	319Ч/061М
320Ч	Day 5	22:33	22:58	Karymskaya	14:31	14:49	Day 3	319Ч
320Ч	Day 6	↓	↓	Mogoytuy	12:50	13:00	Day 3	319Ч
320Ч	Day 6	01:30	02:45	Olovyannaya	11:32	11:42	Day 3	319Ч
320Ч	Day 6	↓	↓	Yasnogorsk	11:05	11:15	Day 3	319Ч
320Ч	Day 6	04:13	05:07	Borzya	09:18	09:54	Day 3	319Ч
320Ч/K20	Day 6	07:10	13:05	Zaibaikalsk	02:26	07:16	Day 3	K19/319Ч
↑ Russia（MST UTC+03:00） / China（CST UTC+08:00） ↓
K20	Day 6	18:30	23:59	Manzhouli	04:00	07:01	Day 3	K19
K20	Day 7	02:07	02:15	Hailar	02:03	02:13	Day 3	K19
K20	Day 7	05:11	05:20	Bugt	22:38	22:48	Day 2	K19
K20	Day 7	09:15	09:35	Angangxi	18:36	18:47	Day 2	K19
K20	Day 7	12:29	13:16	Harbin	15:12	15:55	Day 2	K19
K20	Day 7	15:49	15:57	Changchun	12:27	12:37	Day 2	K19
K20	Day 7	19:26	19:34	Shenyang	08:47	08:55	Day 2	K19
K20	Day 7	22:11	22:16	Jinzhou	06:11	06:15	Day 2	K19
K20	Day 8	00:14	00:22	Shanhaiguan	04:07	04:13	Day 2	K19
K20	Day 8	02:21	02:27	Tangshan	02:01	02:03	Day 2	K19
K20	Day 8	03:52	03:59	Tianjin	00:35	00:41	Day 2	K19
K20	Day 8	05:49	—	Beijing	—	23:00	Day 1	K19

== Hijacking ==
At midnight of 13 July 2003, three culprits of a syndicate sneaked onto a train to Beijing and looted 4 coaches with Chinese passengers by threatening and assaulting them. From 13 to 14 July, the syndicate looted 7400 Russian rubles, 200 USD and 100 RMB. The victims were Chinese traders and students in Russia. The syndicate escaped the train at China on 15 July and the victims lodged a police report after clearing immigration in China. The police sent arrest warrants to all border checkpoints based on the passport information. On 16 December 2003, the head of the syndicate was arrested at Manzhouli, and he was sentenced to jail for 13 years, 3 years suspension of public rights and a fine of 20,000 RMB by Beijing Intermediate Railways Court.

== See also ==
- China Railway K3/4
- Trans-Siberian Railway
- Longest train services
