= China Railway K3/4 =

Weekly international K-series train

K3/4
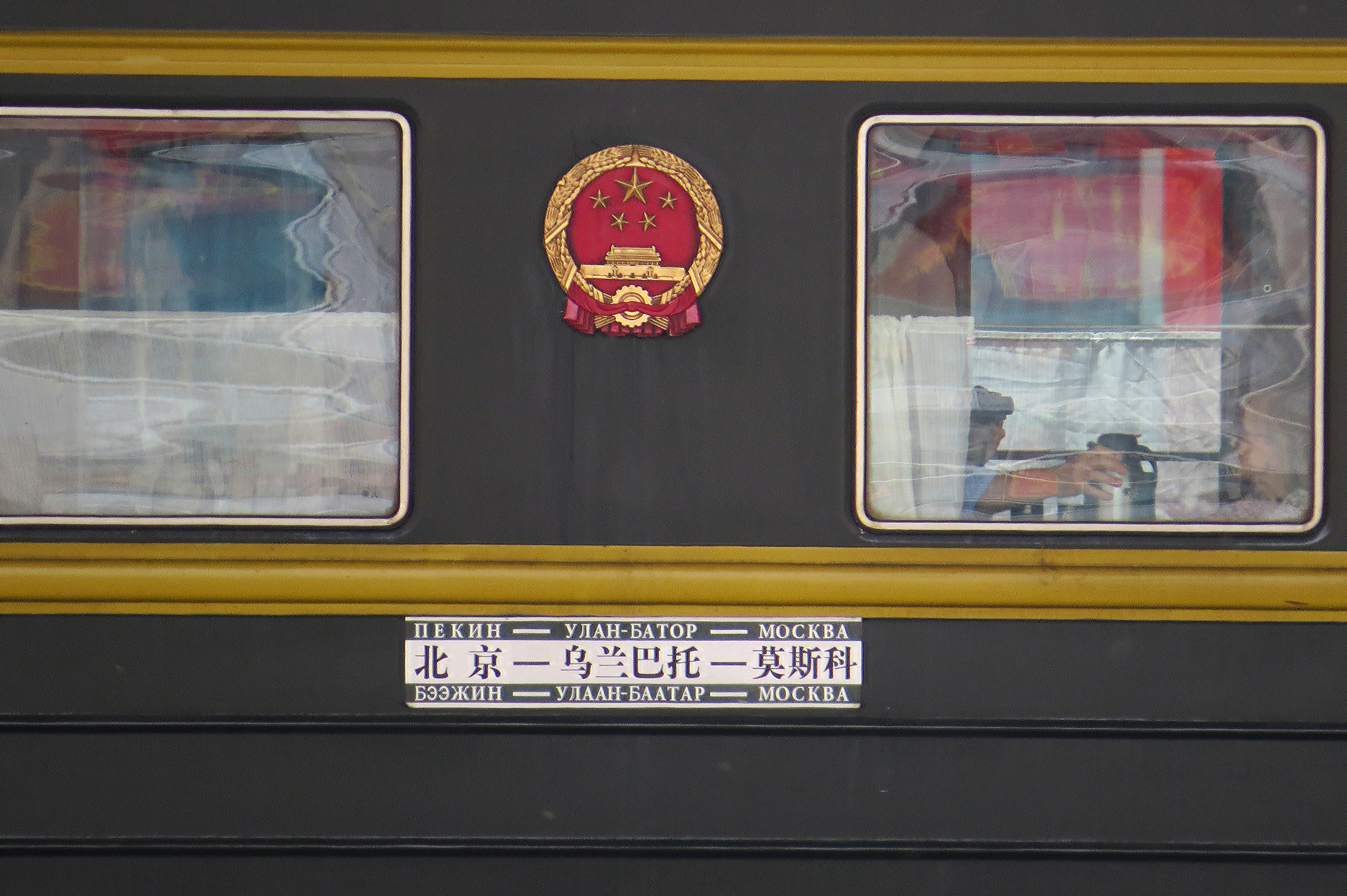
- The destination board of the K3/4 train.

Overview
- Service type: Long-haul international rail service
- Status: Suspended
- Locale: North and East Asia
- First service: June 4, 1959
- Current operator: China Railway
- Former operator: Soviet Railways (4 June 1959 – 24 May 1960)

Route
- Termini: Beijing, China; Moscow, Russia
- Stops: 33
- Distance travelled: 7,826 km (4,863 mi)
- Average journey time: 131 hours 31 minutes (K3), 129 hours 50 minutes (K4)
- Service frequency: Weekly
- Train numbers: K3/4 (Within China); 003/004 (Within Mongolia); 003З/004З (Within Russia)
- Lines used: Trans-Siberian Railway, Trans-Mongolian Railway, Ji'er Railway, and Jingbao Railway

On-board services
- Classes: Hard sleeper, luxury Soft sleeper
- Sleeping arrangements: 6 berth sleepers and 2 berth sleepers
- Catering facilities: Restaurant car

Technical
- Rolling stock: 25G
- Track gauge: 1520 mm and 1435mm (with break of gauge)
- Track owners: Russian Railways; China Railway; Ulaanbaatar Railway

The China Railway K3/4 train is a weekly international K-series train from Beijing to Moscow via Ulaanbaatar mainly using the Trans-Siberian and Trans-Mongolian railways.

The train started running in 1959, covering a distance of 7826 km, and is the 4th longest passenger train service in the world. The Beijing to Moscow train (K3/003/003З) departs every Wednesday from Beijing station and takes 131 hours and 31 minutes to arrive at Moscow Yaroslavsky station, while the Moscow to Beijing train (K4/004/004З) departs every Tuesday from Moscow and takes 129 hours and 50 minutes to arrive at Beijing.

The train was suspended as a result of the COVID-19 pandemic. The suspension was further extended due to the war in Ukraine.

== History ==
When this train was first operated in the 1960s, most of the passengers were government officials, with there being police guarding it even in the depot, earning it the nickname "The Mystery Train of the East". During the Sino-Soviet split in the 1980s, as little as 20 passengers took the K3/4 train, although it continued to operate.

After the dissolution of the Soviet Union in 1991, the train became mostly filled with businessmen and traders carrying their goods, which when combined with lack of policing at the time, caused a series of robberies now known as the Trans-Siberian train robberies.

In 2000, China initiated its third campaign to increase the speed of its railways, the K3/4 train was sped up and renumbered from 3/4 to K3/4. After the 2000s, the train became mostly used by tourists instead, becoming a tourist train.

In 2020, this train service has suspended due to COVID-19 pandemic through the three countries.

During 25 February and 11 March, 2025, a 12-carriage K3/4 started trial run without any passengers, to prepare for a future operation resumption. In this trial, coaches are replaced by International 25G.

== Train composition ==
The train is mostly made up of China Railway train cars, painted in green as was common in communist countries of the time. There is no air conditioning in the train, as it uses coal for heating, requiring on average 4-5 tons of coal for each staff member on the train.

As China uses 1435mm standard gauge rail track, while Russia and Mongolia use 1520 mm broad gauge track, there is a break of gauge at the Chinese-Mongolian border, where the train stops for around three hours at Erenhot, where passengers first go through Chinese immigration procedures, then the entire train is lifted up, then the train's bogies are swapped out for new bogies of the corresponding gauge. Passengers remain in the train while this procedure is conducted.

The train is composed of thirteen carriages in China, with nine international carriages, composed of five hard sleepers, three luxury soft sleepers and a baggage car, as well as three domestic hard sleeper carriages and a domestic restaurant car. Other domestic restaurant cars and sleeper carriages are also attached upon entering Mongolia and Russia.

Section	Beijing↔Erenhot			Beijing↔Moscow							Zamin Uud↔Sukhbaatar		Naushki↔Moscow	
Coach	Nil	0	A1-A2	1-2	3	5-7	8	9-10	11	12-15	Nil	0	Nil	18 (K3), 3 (K4)
Type	CA25G Restaurant	YW25G Hard Sleeper	YW25G Hard Sleeper	KD25G Air-con	XL25G Luggage	YW25G Hard Sleeper	RW25G Soft sleeper	RW25G Luxury soft sleeper	YW25G Hard Sleeper	YW25G Hard Sleeper	МЕСТ РЕСТОРАН Restaurant	МЕСТ-18 18 pax Luxury kupe	МЕСТ РЕСТОРАН Restaurant	МЕСТ-36 36 pax Platzkart
Operator	CR Beijing			CR Beijing							UBTZ		RZD Moscow/East-Siberia	

== Timetable ==
- There is no time difference between China and Mongolia. The time difference between Moscow and China/Mongolia is five hours. (Note: Since Russia has multiple time zones, this table uses Moscow Time.)
- Names in Russian and Mongolian are romanized according to Wikipedia:Romanization of Russian and Wikipedia:Naming conventions (Mongolian).

K3/003/003З				Station	004З/004/K4			
Train	Day	Arr.	Dep.	Station	Arr.	Dep.	Day	Train
K3	Day 1 (Wed)	—	07:27	Beijing	14:35	—	Day 7 (Mon)	K4
K3	Day 1 (Wed)	10:46	10:55	Zhangjiakou	11:01	11:13	Day 7 (Mon)	K4
K3	Day 1 (Wed)	15:27	15:43	Jiningnan	06:37	06:55	Day 7 (Mon)	K4
K3	Day 1 (Wed)	18:03	18:05	Zhurihe	04:07	04:09	Day 7 (Mon)	K4
K3/003	Day 1 (Wed)	20:18	00:59	Erlian	21:00	02:00	Day 6 (Sun)	004/K4
↑ China (CST) / Mongolia (ULAT) ↓
003	Day 2 (Thu)	01:25	02:40	Zamyn-Üüd	18:50	20:35	Day 6 (Sun)	004
003	Day 2 (Thu)	06:15	06:50	Sainshand	14:49	15:20	Day 6 (Sun)	004
003	Day 2 (Thu)	10:13	10:30	Choir	11:22	11:37	Day 6 (Sun)	004
003	Day 2 (Thu)	14:35	15:22	Ulaanbaatar	06:50	07:30	Day 6 (Sun)	004
003	Day 2 (Thu)	17:59	18:14	Züünkharaa	03:40	03:55	Day 6 (Sun)	004
003	Day 2 (Thu)	19:54	20:24	Darkhan I	01:41	01:54	Day 6 (Sun)	004
003/003З	Day 2 (Thu)	21:50	23:29	Sükhbaatar	22:29	00:14	Day 5 (Sat)	004З/004
↑ Mongolia (ULAT) / Russia (MSK) ↓
003З	Day 2 (Thu)	19:14	21:04	Naushki	14:57	16:47	Day 5 (Sat)	004З
003З	Day 2 (Thu)	21:52	22:00	Dzhida	14:11	14:12	Day 5 (Sat)	004З
003З	Day 2 (Thu)	22:30	22:36	Selenduma	↑	↑	Day 5 (Sat)	004З
003З	Day 3 (Fri)	01:34	01:49	Medvedchikovo	↑	↑	Day 5 (Sat)	004З
003З	Day 3 (Fri)	02:28	03:13	Ulan-Ude	09:58	10:43	Day 5 (Sat)	004З
003З	Day 3 (Fri)	08:04	08:09	Slyudyanka I	05:33	05:35	Day 5 (Sat)	004З
003З	Day 3 (Fri)	10:13	10:47	Irkutsk–Passazhirsky	02:43	03:06	Day 5 (Sat)	004З
003З	Day 3 (Fri)	11:01	11:03	Irkutsk–Sortirovochny	02:27	02:29	Day 5 (Sat)	004З
003З	Day 3 (Fri)	11:40	11:42	Angarsk	01:53	01:55	Day 5 (Sat)	004З
003З	Day 3 (Fri)	12:06	12:08	Usolye-Sibirskoye	01:28	01:30	Day 5 (Sat)	004З
003З	Day 3 (Fri)	13:00	13:02	Cheremkhovo	00:37	00:39	Day 5 (Sat)	004З
003З	Day 3 (Fri)	14:48	15:10	Zima	22:31	22:53	Day 4 (Fri)	004З
003З	Day 3 (Fri)	17:03	17:05	Tulun	20:34	20:36	Day 4 (Fri)	004З
003З	Day 3 (Fri)	18:42	18:55	Nizhneudinsk	18:45	18:58	Day 4 (Fri)	004З
003З	Day 3 (Fri)	21:28	21:30	Tayshet	16:10	16:12	Day 4 (Fri)	004З
003З	Day 3 (Fri)	23:29	23:51	Ilanskaya	13:51	14:13	Day 4 (Fri)	004З
003З	Day 4 (Sat)	00:21	00:23	Kansk–Yeniseysky	13:18	13:20	Day 4 (Fri)	004З
003З	Day 4 (Sat)	03:58	04:19	Krasnoyarsk	09:17	09:38	Day 4 (Fri)	004З
003З	Day 4 (Sat)	07:07	07:09	Achinsk I	06:23	06:25	Day 4 (Fri)	004З
003З	Day 4 (Sat)	08:08	08:09	Bogotol	05:26	05:27	Day 4 (Fri)	004З
003З	Day 4 (Sat)	09:53	10:27	Mariinsk	03:12	03:46	Day 4 (Fri)	004З
003З	Day 4 (Sat)	12:23	12:25	Tayga	01:00	01:03	Day 4 (Fri)	004З
003З	Day 4 (Sat)	13:26	13:28	Yurga I	23:57	23:59	Day 3 (Thu)	004З
003З	Day 4 (Sat)	15:39	15:57	Novosibirsk	21:28	21:46	Day 3 (Thu)	004З
003З	Day 4 (Sat)	19:18	19:48	Barabinsk	17:46	18:16	Day 3 (Thu)	004З
003З	Day 4 (Sat)	23:29	23:45	Omsk–Passazhirsky	13:44	14:00	Day 3 (Thu)	004З
003З	Day 5 (Sun)	02:50	03:05	Ishim	10:19	10:34	Day 3 (Thu)	004З
003З	Day 5 (Sun)	06:34	06:55	Tyumen	06:15	06:35	Day 3 (Thu)	004З
003З	Day 5 (Sun)	11:36	12:04	Yekaterinburg–Passazhirsky	01:12	01:40	Day 3 (Thu)	004З
003З	Day 5 (Sun)	17:28	17:48	Perm II	19:42	20:02	Day 2 (Wed)	004З
003З	Day 5 (Sun)	21:21	21:47	Balezino	15:52	16:18	Day 2 (Wed)	004З
003З	Day 6 (Mon)	01:00	01:15	Kirov	11:55	12:10	Day 2 (Wed)	004З
003З	Day 6 (Mon)	05:44	05:46	Semyonov	06:39	06:41	Day 2 (Wed)	004З
003З	Day 6 (Mon)	06:48	07:00	Nizhny Novgorod	05:37	05:49	Day 2 (Wed)	004З
003З	Day 6 (Mon)	10:36	11:06	Vladimir	02:26	02:52	Day 2 (Wed)	004З
003З	Day 6 (Mon)	13:58	—	Moscow–Yaroslavsky	—	23:45	Day 1 (Tue)	004З

== Pop culture ==
The 2018 Chinese crime television series Operation Moscow and the film Moscow Mission and other, older films were based on the Trans-Siberian train robberies that happened on this train in the early 1990s.

The 2020 Chinese comedy film Lost in Russia portrays the protagonist and his mother taking the K3/4 train to Moscow.

== Ticketing ==
The train is priced using Chinese yuan when sold in China, although ticket scalpers may resell the train tickets at much higher prices. Prices to major stations from Beijing:

Station Name	Luxury Soft Sleeper	Hard Sleeper
Ulaanbaatar	2041	1310
Irkutsk	3361	2139
Novosibirsk	4470	2799
Moscow	6080	3793
