= Irkutsk (disambiguation) =

Irkutsk is the largest city and administrative center of Irkutsk Oblast, Russia.

Irkutsk may also refer to:

- Irkutsk Oblast, a federal subject of Russia
- Irkutsk Airport, an airport in Irkutsk, Russia
- Irkutsk Energy, a hydroelectric company in Russia
- Irkutsk Northwest Airport, is a civilian airport located near Irkutsk Russia
- Irkutsk railway station, a station along the Trans-Siberian Railway
