= Ulaanbaatar Metro =

Planned rapid transit system in Ulaanbaatar, Mongolia

Overview
- Native name: Улаанбаатар метро
- Owner: Government of Mongolia
- Locale: Ulaanbaatar, Mongolia
- Transit type: Metro
- Number of lines: 1
- Number of stations: 15

Operation
- Operation will start: 2030

Technical
- System length: 19.4 km (12.1 mi)
- Track gauge: 1,435 mm (4 ft 8 1/2 in) (standard gauge)
- Electrification: 1,500 V DC

Ulaanbaatar Metro (Mongolian: Улаанбаатар метро) is a rapid transit system in the planning stages in Ulaanbaatar, Mongolia. The Ulaanbaatar Metro project was approved in 2012, and construction was originally planned to be completed by 2020, however, as of 2026 it is still not open.

== History ==
=== Initial planning ===
The exact date of the initial studies on the project is unknown. Serious planning began in the early 2000s, when the city's population surpassed one million. In 2010, the population of Ulaanbaatar was 1,240,037 inhabitants and is increasing by nearly 100,000 people a year. The transport problem is exacerbated by the harsh climate and long winters. Traffic movement is difficult because of congestion, and the air is heavily polluted by exhaust fumes.

The decision was made at the end of 2011 to begin construction of the first ever metro system in Mongolia. The project was intended to be financed by loans, by Japanese and other international capital. In 2015, construction was postponed. In 2018, planning was resumed, and the cost was then expected to be around $1.5 billion. In 2018, Mongolia adopted transport oriented plan for Ulaanbaatar and reconsidered many mass transit options in Mongolia, including Metro system.

=== Reintroduction ===
On December 23, 2023, the Minister of Mongolia B. Delgersaikhan, Chair of the National Committee on the Reduction of Traffic Congestion in Ulaanbaatar, and Khishgeegiin Nyambaatar, the Governor of the Capital City and the Mayor of Ulaanbaatar City were granted the right to organize the work to announce an international bidding for contractors and management consulting services for the construction of the metro in Ulaanbaatar in 2024-2028, ensuring compliance with all relevant laws and regulations. The meeting resulted in revising the mass transit studies done by the Japanese firms in 2012 as Ulaanbaatar has grown widely since then.

On February 15, 2024, the draft resolution of the 2024 Budget Amendments for Ulaanbaatar was submitted by Khishgeegiin Nyambaatar and Chairperson of Ulaanbaatar's Citizens' Representative Khural Batbayasgalan Jantsan which the budget for the construction of Ulaanbaatar Metro was included. The international tender to construct the metro system was launched by Nyambaatar on 29 February 2024. The initial tender closed on 18 March 2024.

== Construction ==
A total number of 42 points of vertical drilling were made along the metro route with 500 meters spaced apart in 2024.

On December 9, 2025, The Governor’s Office of Ulaanbaatar announced that construction of the Ulaanbaatar Metro will begin in June 2026. The project consists of a single 19.4-kilometer line, with feasibility studies and a detailed environmental impact assessment already completed. Contractors are being selected from a prequalified shortlist. The metro line is planned for handover in 2030.

The stations will be spaced 800 meters to 1.7 kilometers apart. Twin tunnels with diameters of 6.6 to 7.2 meters will be built using the cross-passage tunneling method. The system is expected to require a maximum installed capacity of 29 megawatts, with four power-boosting substations built within station structures. Trains will operate on 1,500-volt electrical power.

== Proposed route ==
In Ulaanbaatar, 15 stations are proposed from Tolgoit Station to Amgalan Station, with a total of approximately 19.4 km. The route will run mainly along Peace Avenue and will be built 20–30 meters underground. Stations will include fully underground stations such as Sükhbaatar near Sükhbaatar Square, while some may be above ground. The system is designed to carry up to 17,000 passengers per hour per direction during peak periods. According to the revised operational plan, trains are expected to operate frequently to meet demand, and by 2030, when daily trips in Ulaanbaatar are projected to reach 4.5 million. The metro system is expected to accommodate approximately 450,000 daily passenger trips. Travel time along the full length of the line from Tolgoit to Amgalan is projected to decrease by 32 minutes compared to current road conditions.

The table below is based on the UBM-PMC proposal (the provisional names in Mongolian are from the JICA proposal).

Station Number	Station Name (Provisional)	Distance (km)	Total (km)	Area
W-7	Толгойт (Tolgoit)	-	0.00	Songino Khairkhan/Bayangol
W-6	Баруун зүгийн тээврийн товчоо (West Bus Terminal)	1.89	1.89	Songino Khairkhan/Bayangol
W-5	Хархорин зах (Kharkhorin Market)	1.33	3.22	Songino Khairkhan/Bayangol
W-4	Саппорогийн уулзвар (Sapporo Rotary)	1.46	4.68	Songino Khairkhan/Bayangol
W-3	25-р эмийн сан (25th Pharmacy)	1.56	6.24	Bayangol
W-2	Гандантэгчинлэн хийд (Gandantegchinlen Monastery)	1.35	7.59	Bayangol/Chingeltei/Sükhbaatar
W-1	Улсын Их дэлгүүр (State Department Store)	0.88	8.47	Chingeltei/Sükhbaatar
CS	Сүхбаатарын талбай (Sükhbaatar Square)	0.94	9.41	Sükhbaatar
E-1	Бөхийн өргөө (Wrestling Palace)	1.32	10.73	Bayanzürkh
E-2	Кино үйлдвэр (Cinema Studio)	1.29	12.02	Bayanzürkh
E-3	Офицеруудын ордон (Officer's Palace)	1.26	13.28	Bayanzürkh
E-4	Ботаникийн хүрээлэн (West Botanical Garden)	1.54	14.82	Bayanzürkh
E-5	Тролейбусны эцэс (Trolley Bus Terminal)	1.12	15.94	Bayanzürkh
E-6	Амгалан (Amgalan)	1.31	17.25	Bayanzürkh
E-7	Unity Park	1.75	19.00	Bayanzürkh

Originally, the metro was proposed as 14 stations over 17.7 km, with a JICA study highlighting peak passenger volumes between Sapporo Rotary station and 25th Pharmacy station, and an earlier 2012 operational plan projecting trains every eight to nine minutes in 2020 and every five minutes in 2030.

== See also ==
- Ulaanbaatar Railbus
- Ulaanbaatar Tram
