= Ulaanbaatar Railbus =

Rail transport in Ulaanbaatar, Mongolia

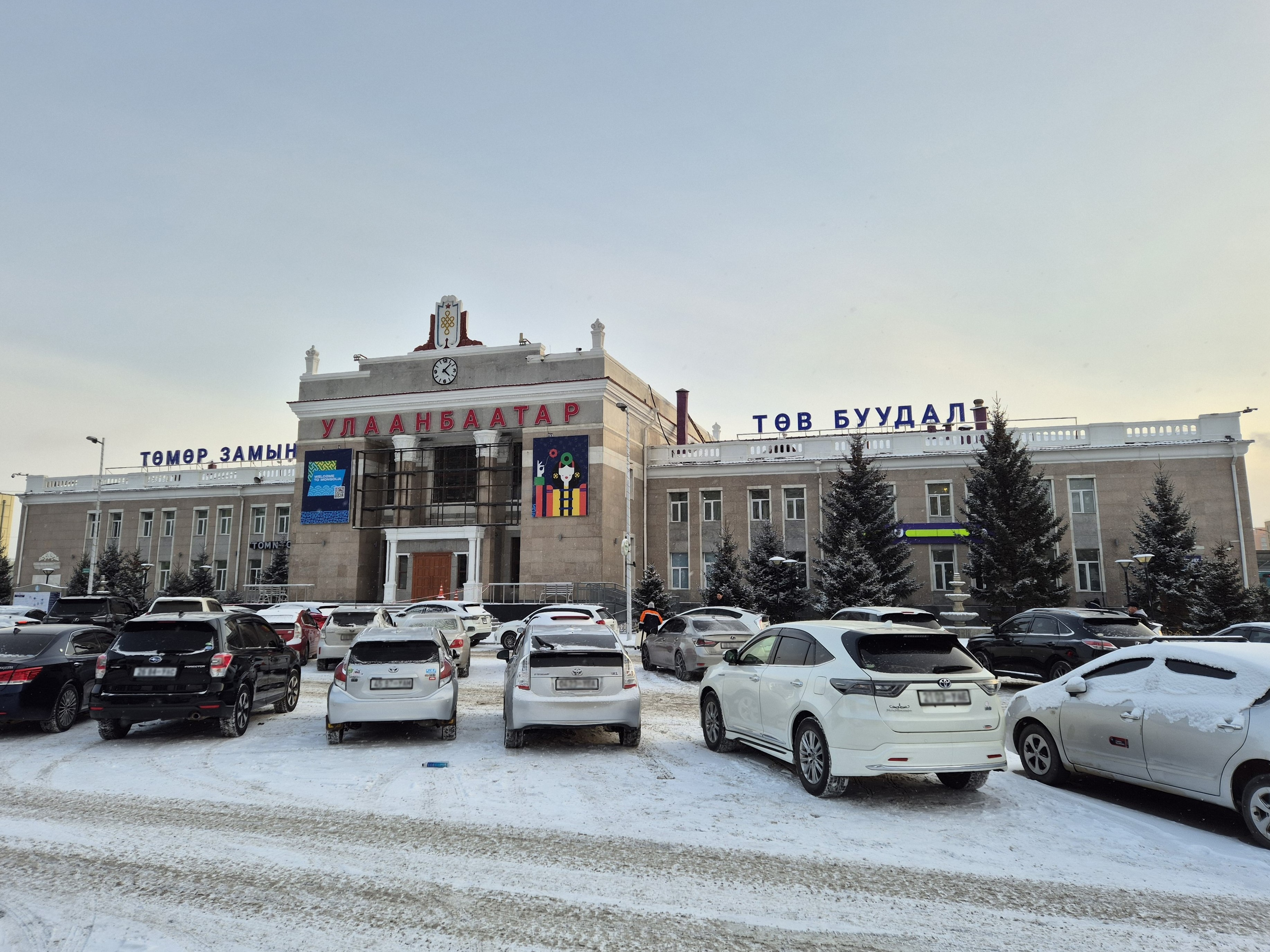
Ulaanbaatar Railway Station, Bayangol, Ulaanbaatar, Mongolia

The Ulaanbaatar Railbus is a rail-based public transit system in the Mongolian capital of Ulaanbaatar. The city line opened on June 6, 2014, and the suburban line opened on October 20, 2014.

The railway serves the Ulaanbaatar Metropolitan Area, and was built on the existing ground-based railway infrastructure of the Trans-Mongolian Railway, which runs within the city in a latitudinal direction. The railway is a joint project of the Ulaanbaatar mayor's office and the Mongolian Ulaanbaatar Railways, a joint-stock company with equal shares of participants in the authorized capital from the governments of Russia (via Russian Railways) and Mongolia.

== History ==
Although Ulaanbaatar has a well-developed public transportation network, traffic is severely congested. In 2014, a decision was made to create an urban railway using the existing Trans-Mongolian Railway infrastructure, which runs within the city limits. The initiators of the line's creation were the Mayor of Ulaanbaatar, Erdeniin Bat-Üül, and the Minister of Transport and Roads of Mongolia, Amarjargal Gansukh.

From February to May 2014, reconstruction of existing stations and construction of new ones took place. The first phase of construction included the construction of four new intermediate stations with low platforms and the reconstruction of two terminal stations – Tolgoit and Amgalan, as well as the central station – Ulaanbaatar.

The second phase of construction involved the allocation of land by the Ulaanbaatar mayor's office for the construction of a second track, pedestrian crossings and vehicle overpasses over the railway tracks, and the construction of sound-absorbing screens in residential areas.

On June 6, the railbus was successfully launched. The official launch of the Ulaanbaatar City Railway line, on June 6, 2014, was timed to coincide with the 65th anniversary of the founding of the Ulaanbaatar Railways.

== Route ==
The rail route has one line, and starts at the west side of the capital at the Tolgoit Station, through the city centre to the east side of the city terminating at the Amgalan Station. There are a total of eight stations on the route. Train travel time: from Tolgoit stop to Amgalan - 47 minutes, from Amgalan to Tolgoit - 45 minutes.

=== The city line ===
Station	Coordinates
Tolgoit Station	47°54′31″N 106°46′42″E
Tavanshar Station	47°54′33″N 106°48′33″E
Bars-2 Station	47°54′32″N 106°50′52″E
Ulaanbaatar Station	47°54′31″N 106°53′02″E
Dundgol Station	47°54′27″N 106°55′50″E
Narantuul Station	47°54′27″N 106°56′51″E
Ulaankhuaran Station	47°54′25″N 106°58′13″E
Amgalan Station	47°54′12″N 107°00′52″E

=== The suburban line ===
On October 20, 2014, an express service was launched between Ulaanbaatar and Darkhan with an intermediate stop in Züünkharaa.

Station	Coordinates
Ulaanbaatar Station	47°54′30″N 106°53′02″E
Züünkharaa Station	48°51′26″N 106°27′16″E
Darkhan-1 Station	49°29′05″N 105°55′50″E

== Rolling stock ==
Two Metrowagonmash RA-2 railbuses are operated on the route, the first trip was on 7 June 2014. The railbuses can reach a speed of 160 km/h (100 mph), making the cross-city trip in 45-47 minutes at an average speed of 100 km/h (60 mph).

== See also ==
- Ulaanbaatar Metro
- Rail transport in Mongolia
