= EP1 (electric locomotive) =

Russian electric locomotive class

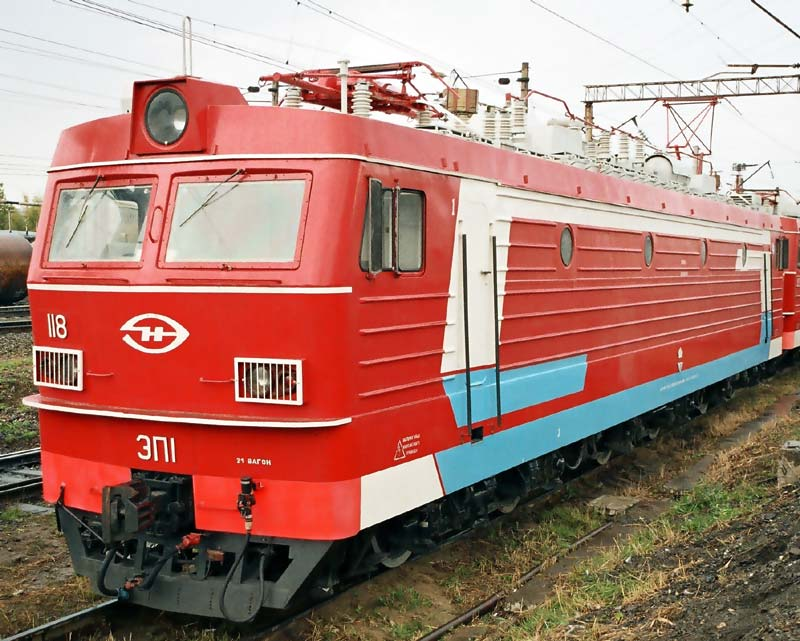
- EP1-118
Type and origin
- Power type: Electric
- Builder: Transmashholding, NEVZ
- Build date: EP1: 1998-2007; EP1M: 2006-present EP1P: 2007-2010
- Total produced: EP1: 381; EP1M: 453; EP1P: 74
Specifications
- Configuration
  - Commonwealth: Bo-Bo-Bo
- Gauge: 1,524 mm (5 ft)
- Wheel diameter: 1,250 mm (4 ft 1 in)
- Minimum curve: 125 m (410 ft)
- Length: 22.5 m (73 ft 10 in) (EP1); 22.532 m (73 ft 11.1 in) (EP1M/EP1P)
- Width: 3,232 mm (10 ft 7.2 in)
- Height
  - Pantograph: 5,050 mm (16 ft 7 in)
- Axle load: 22 t (22 long tons; 24 short tons)
- Service weight: 132 t (130 long tons; 146 short tons)
- Electric system/s: 25 kV 50 Hz AC
- Current pickup: Pantograph
- Gear ratio: 85:26 (EP1/EP1M); 88:23 (EP1P)
- Loco brake: Regenerative
Performance figures
- Maximum speed: 140 km/h (87 mph) (EP1/EP1M); 120 km/h (75 mph) (EP1P)
- Power output
  - 1 hour: 4,700 kW (6,300 hp)
  - Continuous: 4,400 kW (5,900 hp)
Career
- Operators: Russian Railways
- First run: 1999

Electric locomotive EP1 is a Russian electric locomotive which has been produced by Novocherkassk Electric Locomotive Plant since 1998. It is the first Russian passenger electric locomotive with the 2_{o}-2_{o}-2_{o} or Bo-Bo-Bo axle arrangement. There are, as of December 2016, 866 of these locomotives.

== History ==
In the 1990s there were few passenger electric locomotives in Russia. The existing Chesh electric locomotives CHS4 and CHS4t were rather old to head passenger trains. A decision was therefore taken to commission a new electric passenger locomotive.

The first example of this locomotive was made in 1998, based on the existing VL65 design and modified for passenger traffic. The locomotive proved successful and was ordered in large numbers.

== Modifications ==
=== Electric locomotive EP1M ===
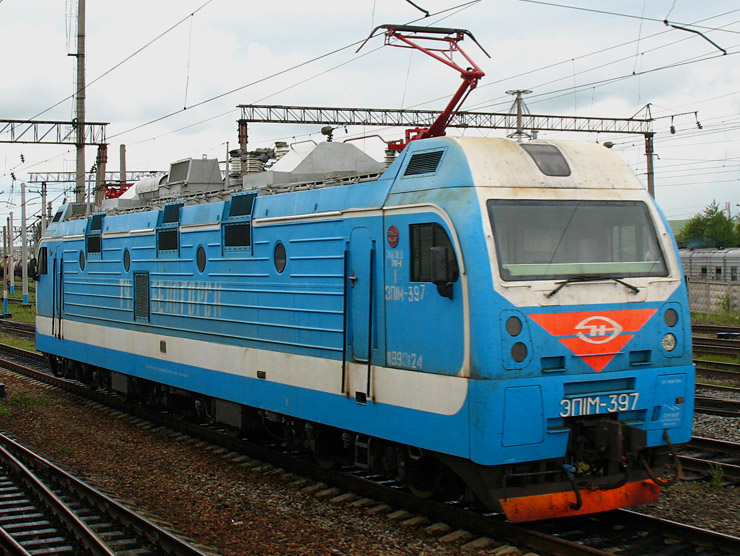
EP1M-397

This locomotive is an EP1 with a new driver's cab, as featured in the 2ES4K locomotive. This cab features a new modern control console, and climate control. This variant first appeared in 2007.

=== Electric locomotive EP1P ===
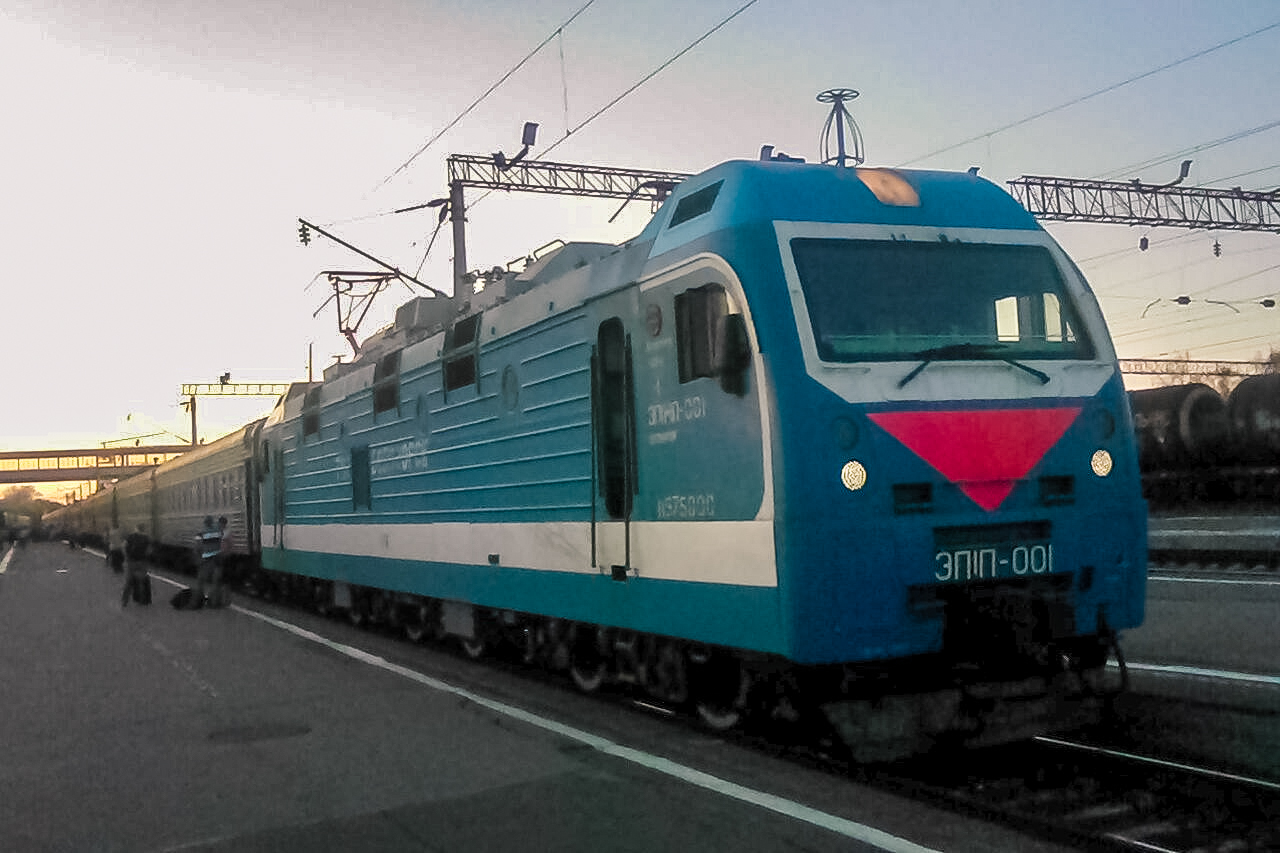
EP1P-001

This locomotive is a further modification to the EP1M, featuring a more powerful motor, and also appeared in 2007.

== See also ==
- The Museum of the Moscow Railway, at Paveletsky Rail Terminal, Moscow
- Rizhsky Rail Terminal, Home of the Moscow Railway Museum
- Varshavsky Rail Terminal, St.Petersburg, Home of the Central Museum of Railway Transport, Russian Federation
- History of rail transport in Russia
