= Ulaanbaatar Tram =

Tram in Ulaanbaatar, Mongolia

- Улаанбаатар трамвай ᠤᠯᠠᠭᠠᠨᠪᠠᠭᠠᠲᠤᠷ ᠲᠷᠠᠮᠸᠠᠢ

Operation
- Locale: Ulaanbaatar, Mongolia
- Open: 2030 (planned)
- Status: under construction
- Lines: 2

Infrastructure
- Track gauge: 1,435 mm (4 ft 8 1/2 in) standard gauge 1,000 mm (3 ft 3 3/8 in) metre gauge 3 ft 6 in (1,067 mm)

Statistics
- Route length: 26 km (16 mi)
- Stops: 39

The Ulaanbaatar Tram (Mongolian: Улаанбаатар Трамвай) is a planned tram in Ulaanbaatar, Mongolia.

== History ==
In 2025, the project is on the research, feasibility study and design development stage. It is expected to be completed by 2030. On July 9, 2025, the Science and Technology Council of the Ministry of Roads and Transport approved the feasibility study for Lines I and II of the Ulaanbaatar Tram project. Prior to final approval, the study had been reviewed and endorsed by the Ministry’s Sub-council for Railways and verified by the Ministry’s Development Center.

== Routes ==
The tram will have two lines running along the city’s north-south axis with double tracks. According to the Governor’s Office of Ulaanbaatar, the first line will run 11 kilometers from the Zunjin Shopping Center to Sukhbaatar Square with 16 stops. The second line will extend 15 kilometers from the General Authority for Archives to Sukhbaatar Square with 23 stops.

== See also ==
- Ulaanbaatar Metro
