= Ulan-Ude railway station =

Railway station in Ulan-Ude, Russia

Ulan-Ude Улан-Удэ
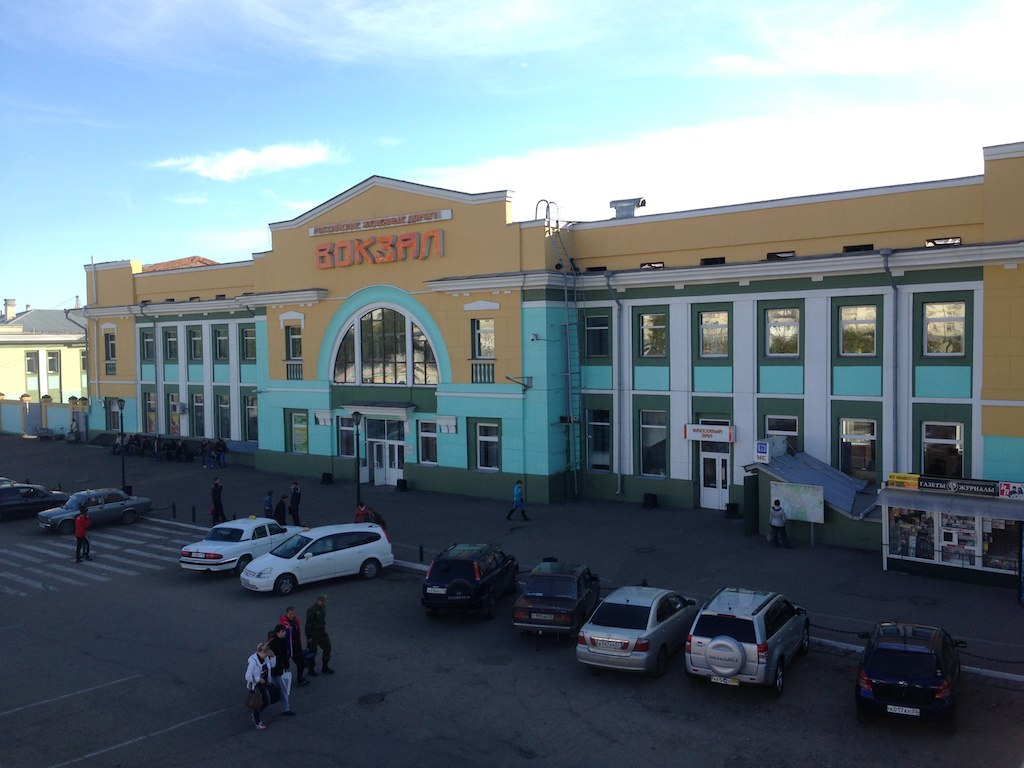
- View of the station from the street.

General information
- Location: Ulan-Ude; Buryatia; Russia
- Coordinates: 51°50′28.2″N 107°34′59.4″E
- Owner: Russian Railways
- Operator: East Siberian Railway
- Platforms: 3
- Tracks: 8
- Train operators: Russian Railways; China Railway; Ulaanbaatar Railway

Construction
- Structure type: At-grade
- Parking: Yes

Other information
- Station code: 935506
- Fare zone: 0

History
- Opened: 1900

Services
Preceding station	Russian Railways	Following station
Tataurovo towards Moscow Yaroslavsky	Moscow–Vladivostok	Talitsi towards Vladivostok
Terminus	Trans-Mongolian Railway	Naushki towards Jining
Location

Ulan-Ude railway station is the primary passenger railway station for the city of Ulan-Ude in the Republic of Buryatia in Russia, and an important stop along the Trans-Siberian Railway and Trans-Mongolian Railway.

== Trains ==
=== Major Domestic Routes ===
- Moscow — Vladivostok
- Novosibirsk — Vladivostok
- Moscow — Khabarovsk
- Novosibirsk — Neryungri
- Moscow — Ulan Ude
- Adler — Chita

=== International ===
Train number	Train name	Destination	Operated by
001М/002Щ	Rossiya; Россия	(Russia) Moscow (Yaroslavsky) (Russia) Vladivostok (cars: (North Korea) Pyongyang, (North Korea) Tumangang)	(Russia) Russian Railways
003З/004З		(Russia) Moscow (Yaroslavsky) (China) Beijing (Main); Runs through Mongolia	China Railway
005Щ/006Щ		(Russia) Moscow (Yaroslavsky) (Mongolia) Ulaanbaatar (cars: (Mongolia) Erdenet)	(Russia) Russian Railways (Mongolia) Ulaanbaatar Railway
019Ч/020Щ	Vostok; Восток	(Russia) Moscow (Yaroslavsky) (China) Beijing (Main)	(Russia) Russian Railways
305И/306И		(Mongolia) Ulaanbaatar	(Mongolia) Ulaanbaatar Railway
