= Ulaanbaatar railway station =

Railway station in Bayangol, Ulaanbaatar, Mongolia

Coordinates: 47°54′30″N 106°53′02″E

Ulaanbaatar Railway Station
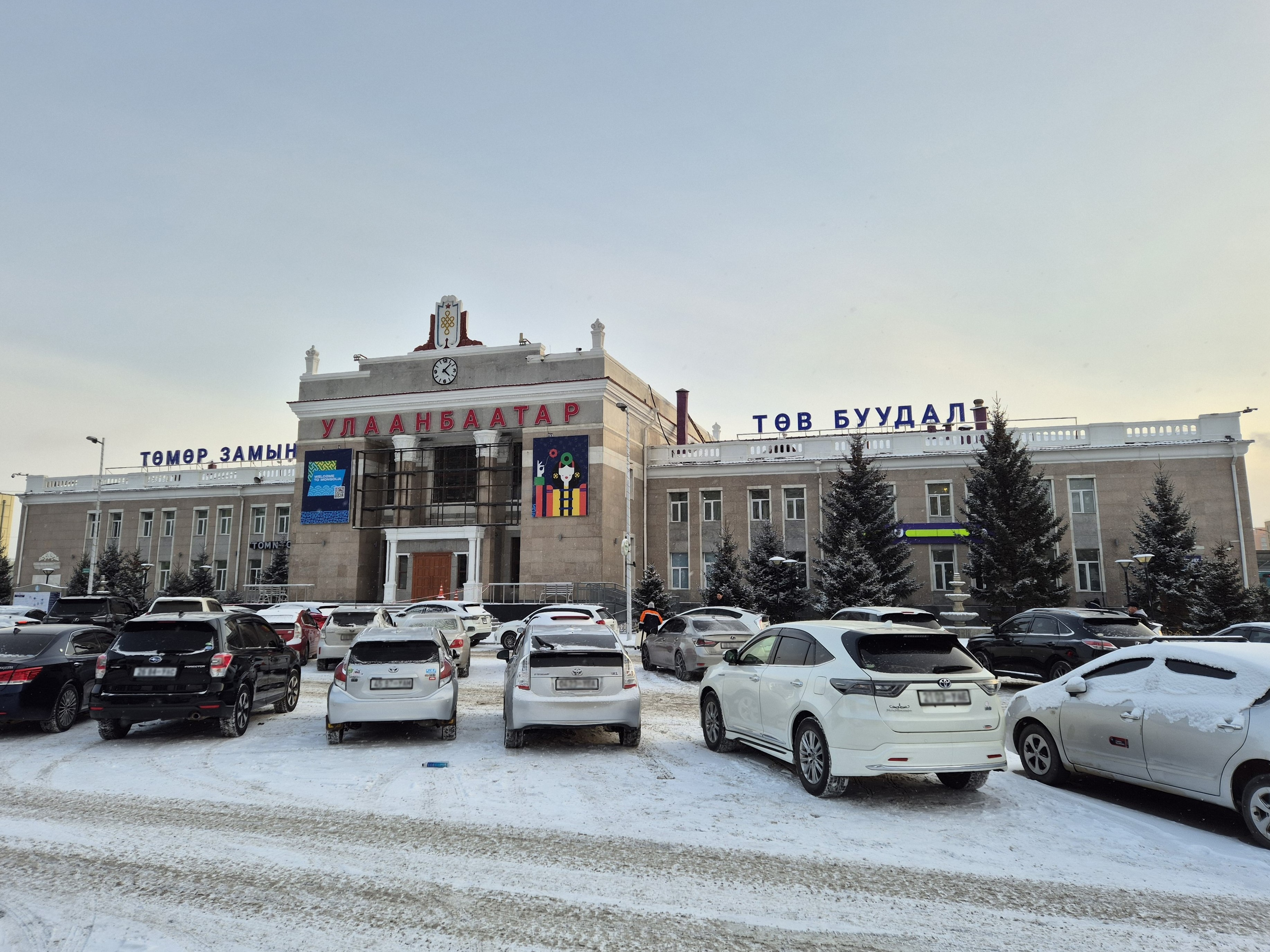

General information
- Location: Bayangol, Ulaanbaatar, Mongolia
- System: Trans-Mongolian Railway terminal
- Owner: Trans-Mongolian Railway
- Line: Sükhbaatar—Ulaanbaatar—Sainshand
- Platforms: 3 (2 island platforms)
- Tracks: 6

Construction
- Parking: yes

Other information
- Station code: 3100022

History
- Opened: 1949
Location

Ulaanbaatar (Mongolian: Улаанбаатар өртөө) is the main railway station of Ulaanbaatar, the capital of Mongolia.

The station is the center of regional and international traffic in Mongolia, and is the largest station in the country. The Trans-Mongolian Railway passes through the station. There is a direct railway connection with Russia, a train runs on the Irkutsk-Ulaanbaatar route.

== History ==
The station was opened in 1949. In 2014 it became the main terminal of the Ulaanbaatar Railbus.

== Trains ==
Train number	Destination	Operated by
003/004	(Russia) Moscow (Yaroslavsky) (China) Beijing (Main)	(China) Chinese Railways
005/006	(Russia) Moscow (Yaroslavsky)	(Russia) Russian Railways (Mongolia) Mongolian Railways
021/022	(China) Erenhot	(Mongolia) Mongolian Railways
023/024	(China) Beijing (Main)	(China) Chinese Railways (Mongolia) Mongolian Railways
033/034	(China) Hohhot	(China) Chinese Railways (Mongolia) Mongolian Railways
263/264	(Mongolia) Sükhbaatar	(Mongolia) Mongolian Railways
271/272	(Mongolia) Sükhbaatar	(Mongolia) Mongolian Railways
275/276	(Mongolia) Zamyn-Üüd	(Mongolia) Mongolian Railways
277/278	(Mongolia) Zamyn-Üüd	(Mongolia) Mongolian Railways
281/282	(Mongolia) Darkhan (cars: (Mongolia) Sharyngol)	(Mongolia) Mongolian Railways
285/286	(Mongolia) Sainshand	(Mongolia) Mongolian Railways
305/306	(Russia) Irkutsk	(Russia) Russian Railways (Mongolia) Mongolian Railways
311/312	(Mongolia) Erdenet	(Mongolia) Mongolian Railways
609/610	(Mongolia) Bor-Öndör (Cars that continue to Ulaanbaatar detach in Airag)	(Mongolia) Mongolian Railways
