= Selenduma =

Selenduma Селендума
- Selo
- Location within Republic of Buryatia Location within Russia
- Coordinates: 50°55′N 106°14′E
- Country: Russia
- Region: Republic of Buryatia
- District: Selenginsky District
- Time zone: UTC+8:00

Selenduma (Russian: Селендума; Buryat: Сэлэндγγмэ, Selendüüme) is a rural locality (a selo) in Selenginsky District, Republic of Buryatia, Russia. The population was 2,574 as of 2010. There are 64 streets.

== Geography ==
Selenduma is located 55 km southwest of Gusinoozyorsk (the district's administrative centre) by road. Shana is the nearest rural locality.

== Media coverage ==
On 11 May 2022, SBS Dateline published a film online discussing how Russian military and patriotic education programs contribute to convincing young men to join the army. Selenduma is discussed as a small village in which "opportunities are scarce and the military is seen as a way out of poverty." The film claims 23 of Selenduma's young men have been sent to fight in Ukraine.
