= ChS4 =

Class of 232 Soviet electric locomotives

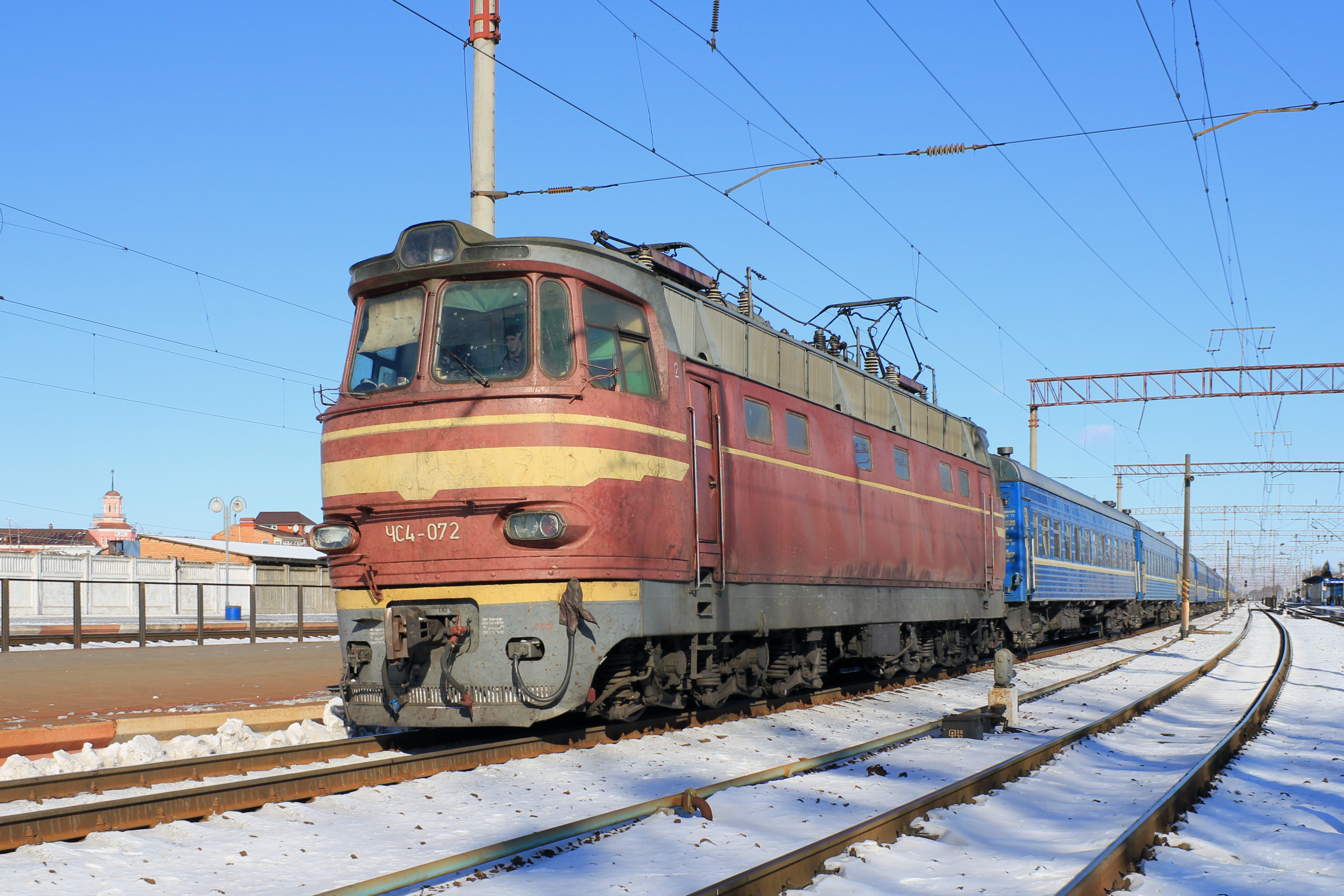
- ChS4
Type and origin
- Power type: Electric
- Builder: Škoda Works
- Build date: 1963-1972
- Total produced: 232
Specifications
- Gauge: 1,524 mm (5 ft); 1,520 mm (4 ft 11 27/32 in) Russian gauge
- Wheel diameter: 1,250 mm (4 ft 1 in)
- Length: 19.980 m (65 ft 6.6 in)
- Height: 5,240 m (17,191 ft 7 in)
- Axle load: 20.5 t (20.2 long tons; 22.6 short tons)
- Loco weight: 123 t (121 long tons; 136 short tons)
- Electric system/s: 25 kV 50 Hz AC Catenary
- Current pickup: Pantograph
Performance figures
- Maximum speed: 160 km/h (99 mph)
- Power output: 5,100 kW (6,800 hp)
Career
- Operators: РЖД (RZhD), БЧ (BCh), УЗ (UZ)
- Locale: Russia; Soviet Union; Belarus; Ukraine

The ChS4 (Czech: ČS4, Russian: ЧС4) is an electric mainline AC passenger locomotive used in Russia, Belarus, and Ukraine.

== ChS4T modification ==
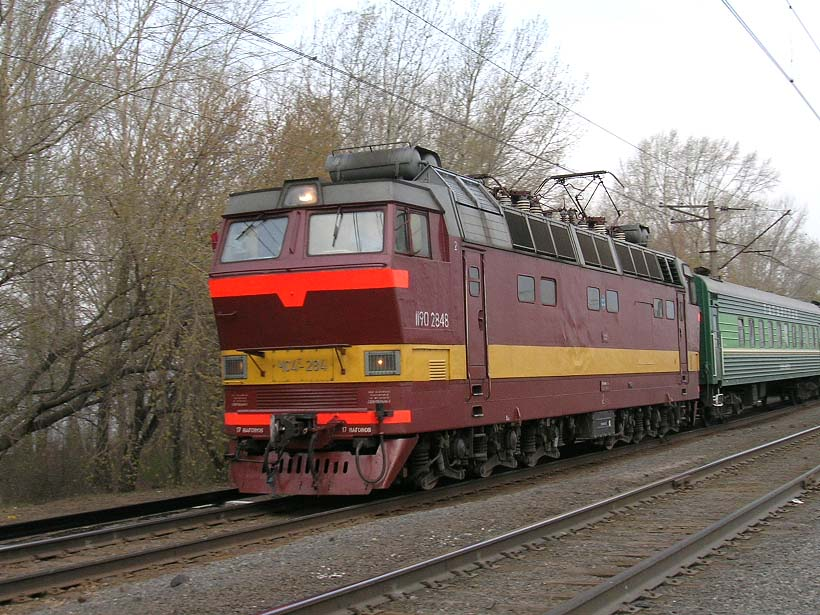
ChS4T-284 in Tatarstan, Russia

To overcome some ChS4 shortcomings, in 1971 a modernized version of locomotive was released. It is known as ChS4T in USSR and as 62E in Czechoslovakia.

== See also ==
- The Museum of the Moscow Railway, at Paveletsky Rail Terminal, Moscow
- Rizhsky Rail Terminal, Moscow, Home of the Moscow Railway Museum
- Varshavsky Rail Terminal, St.Petersburg, Home of the Central Museum of Railway Transport, Russian Federation
- History of rail transport in Russia
