= Irkutsk railway station =

Railway station in Irkutsk, Russia

Irkutsk Иркутск
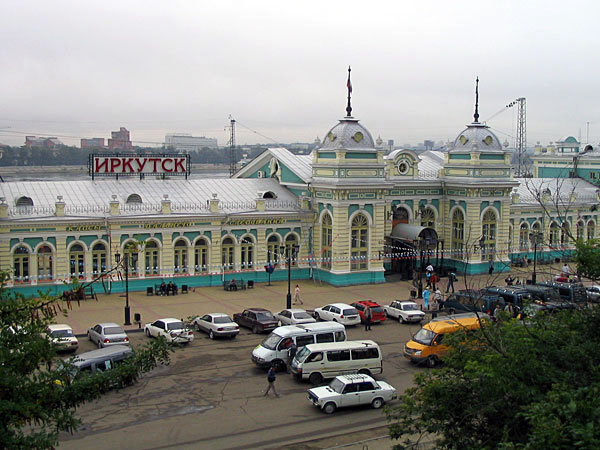
- View of the station from the street.

General information
- Location: Russia, Irkutsk
- Coordinates: 52°16′58.8″N 104°15′35.2″E
- System: East Siberian Railway terminal
- Owner: Russian Railways
- Platforms: 3
- Tracks: 14

Construction
- Parking: yes

Other information
- Station code: 930108
- Fare zone: 0

History
- Opened: 1899

Services
Preceding station	East Siberian Railway	Following station
Location

Irkutsk–Passazhirsky is the primary passenger railway station for the city of Irkutsk in Russia, and an important stop along the Trans-Siberian Railway. The main building takes an area of 7,590 square metres.

== Trains and destinations ==
=== Major Domestic Routes ===
- Moscow — Vladivostok
- Novosibirsk — Vladivostok
- Moscow — Khabarovsk
- Novosibirsk — Neryungri
- Moscow — Ulan Ude
- Adler — Irkutsk
- Adler — Chita

=== International ===
Train number	Train name	Destination	Operated by
001М/002Щ	Rossiya; Россия	(Russia) Moscow (Yaroslavsky) (Russia) Vladivostok (cars: (North Korea) Pyongyang, (North Korea) Tumangang)	(Russia) Russian Railways
003З/004З		(Russia) Moscow (Yaroslavsky) (China) Beijing (Main); Runs through Mongolia	China Railway
005Щ/006Щ		(Russia) Moscow (Yaroslavsky) (Mongolia) Ulaanbaatar (cars: (Mongolia) Erdenet)	(Russia) Russian Railways (Mongolia) Ulaanbataar Railway
019Ч/020Щ	Vostok; Восток	(Russia) Moscow (Yaroslavsky) (China) Beijing (Main)	(Russia) Russian Railways
305И/306И		(Mongolia) Ulaanbaatar	(Mongolia) Ulaanbataar Railway
