= 62nd Locarno Film Festival =

Film festival in Locarno, Switzerland

- Opening film: (500) Days Of Summer directed by Marc Webb
- Closing film: Chingisiyn Hoyor Zagal (Two Horses of Genghis Khan) directed by Byambasuren Davaa
- Location: Locarno, Switzerland
- Founded: 1946
- Awards: Golden Leopard: She, A Chinese directed by Xiaolu Guo
- Artistic director: Frederic Marie
- Festival date: Opening: 5 August 2009; Closing: 15 August 2009
- Website: LFF

Locarno Film Festival
- 63rd 61st

The 62nd Locarno Film Festival was held from 5 to 15 August 2009 in Locarno, Switzerland. There were 18 films from 15 countries in competition, seven of which were from first time directors. The opening film of the festival was (500) Days Of Summer directed by Marc Webb. The closing film of the festival was Byambasuren Davaa's 2009 documentary Two Horses of Genghis Khan (Chingisiyn Hoyor Zagal).

The festival held a retrospective of the work of Italian filmmaker and actor Pippo Delbono and a section dedicated to Manga and Japanese anime. This year's Open Doors section was dedicated to Chinese cinema.

The Leopard of Honor was awarded to William Friedkin for his career in cinema and his film To Live And Die In L.A. was featured on the Piazza Grande, the 8,000-seat open-air theater.

The Golden Leopard, the festival's top prize, was awarded to She, A Chinese directed by Xiaolu Guo.

== Official Jury ==
- Jonathan Nossiter, American director
- Hong Sang-soo, South Korean director
- Pascal Bonitzer, French director, screenwriter, and critic
- Nina Hoss, German actress
- Alba Rohrwacher, Italian actress
- Luis Minarro, Spanish producer
- Jean-Marie Blanchand, former director of the Grand Theatre de Geneve.

== Official Sections ==
The following films were screened in these sections:

=== Piazza Grande ===
The following films were screened on the Piazza Grande:

English Title	Original Title	Director(s)	Year	Production Country
(500) Days Of Summer		Marc Webb	2008	USA
Akira		Katsuhiro Otomo	1988	
Blue Sofa		Giuseppe Baresi, Pippo Delbono, Lara Fremder	2009	Italia
Two Horses of Genghis Khan	Chingisiyn Hoyor Zagal	Byambasuren Davaa	2009	Germany
First Squad: The Moment Of Truth		Yoshiharu Ashino, Aljoscha Klimov, Misha Shprits	2009	Canada
Julia's Disappearance	Giulias Verschwinden	Christoph Schaub	2009	Switzerland
The War of the Sons of Light Against the Sons of Darkness	La Guerre Des Fils De Lumière Contre Les Fils Des Ténèbres	Amos Gitai	2009	France
The House of Small Cubes	La Maison en Petits Cubes	Kunio Katō	2008	Japan
The Valley	La Valle Delle Ombre	Misha Gyorik	2009	Switzerland
The Consequences of Love	Le Conseguenze Dell'Amore	Paolo Sorrentino	2004	
Happy End	Les Derniers Jours Du Monde	Arnaud and Jean-Marie Larrieu	2009	France
Simone's Eyes (short)	Les Yeux De Simone (short)	Jean-Louis Porchet	2009	Switzerland
Marching Band		Héléna Cotinier, Pierre-Nicolas Durand, Claude Miller	2009	France
Mobile Suit Gundam I		Yoshiyuki Tomino	1981	
My Sister's Keeper		Nick Cassavetes	2009	USA
Passion		Jean-Luc Godard	1982	
Petit Indi		Marc Recha	2009	Spain
Pom Poko		Isao Takahata	1994	Japan
Redline		Takeshi Koike	2009	Japan
Same Same but Different		Detlev Buck	2009	Germany
Sounds and Silence		Peter Guyer, Norbert Wiedmer	2009	Switzerland
To Live and Die in L.A.		William Friedkin	1985	
Saviors in the Night	Unter Bauern - Retter In Der Nacht	Ludi Boeken	2009	Germany

=== International Competition ===
The following films were screened in the International Competition:

Original Title	English Title	Director(s)	Year	Production Country
A Religiosa Portuguesa		Eugène Green	2009	Portugal
Akadimia Platonos	Platonos Academy	Filippos Tsitos	2009	Greece
Au Voleur	Thief	Sarah Leonor	2009	France
Buben.Baraban		Alexei Mizgirev	2009	Russia
Complices	Accomplices	Frédéric Mermoud	2009	France
Frontier Blues		Babak Jalali	2009	Iran
L'Insurgée	Insurgent	Laurent Perreau	2009	France
La Cantante De Tango	Tango Singer	Diego Martinez Vignatti	2008	Belgium
La Donation	The Legacy	Bernard Émond	2009	Canada
La Invencion De La Carne	The Invention of Meat	Santiago Loza	2009	Argentina
La Paura - Out Of Competition		Pippo Delbono	2009	France
Nothing Personal		Urszula Antoniak	2009	Netherlands
Os Famosos E Os Duendes Da Morte	The Famous and the Goblins of Death	Esmir Filho	2009	Brazil
Sham Moh		Yuhang Ho	2009	Malaysia
She, a Chinese		Xiaolu GUO	2009	Great Britain
Shirley Adams		Oliver Hermanus	2009	South Africa
Summer Wars		Mamoru Hosoda	2009	Japan
The Search		Pema Tseden	2009	China
Wakaranai	I Don't Know	Masahiro Kobayashi	2008	Japan

=== Filmmakers of the Present ===
The Concorso Cineasti del Presente, also known as the Filmmakers of the Present Competition, showcases first and second feature films from emerging filmmakers. The following films were screened in the Filmmakers of the Present Competition section:

Filmmakers of the Present

Original Title	English Title	Director(s)	Year	Production Country
A Fuga, A Raiva, A Dança, A Bunda, A Boca, A Calma, A Vida Da Mulher Gorila	The Escape, the Anger, the Dance, the Ass, the Mouth, the Calm, the Life of the Gorilla Woman	Felipe Bragança, Marina Meliande	2009	Brazil
Castro		Alejo Moguillansky	2008	Argentina
Hälsningar Från Skogen	Greetings from the Forest	Mikel Cee Karlsson	2009	Sweden
Ivul	Weather	Andrew Kötting	2009	France
Kaerlighedens Krigere	The Warriors of Love	Simon Staho	2009	Sweden
Köprüdekiler-Men On The Bridge	Bridge on the Bridge	Asli Özge	2009	Turkey
La Reine Des Pommes	The Apple Queen	Valérie Donzelli	2009	France
Mirna		Corso Salani	2009	Italia
Musashi: The Dream Of The Last Samurai		Mizuho Nishikubo	2009	Japan
Nikotoko Tou	Threw Yours	Takuya Dairiki, Takashi Miura	2008	Japan
October Country		Donal Mosher, Michael Palmieri	2009	USA
Piombo Fuso	Melted Lead	Stefano Savona	2009	Italia
Sogno Il Mondo Il Venerdì	I Dream of the World on Friday	Pasquale Marrazzo	2009	Italia
The Anchorage		Anders Edström, C.W. Winter	2009	USA
The Marsdreamers		Richard Dindo	2009	Switzerland
Todos Mienten	Everyone Lies	Matías Piñeiro	2009	Argentina
Un Transport En Commun	Public Transport	Dyana Gaye	2009	France, Metropolitan

=== Open Doors: Screenings ===
This year's Open Doors section was dedicated to China. The following films were screened in the Open Doors section:

Original Title	English Title	Director(s)	Year	Production Country
Bu Fa Fen Zi		Jie Han	2006	
Dumplings		Fruit Chan	2004	
Er Dong	Is Dong	Jin Yang	2008	China
Exodus		PANG Ho-cheung	2007	Hong Kong
Hao Duo Da Mi		Li Hongqi	2005	China
He Fengming		Bing WANG	2007	Hong Kong
Kuqi De Nüren		LIU Bingjian	2001	China
Liu Liang Shen Gou Ren		Singing CHEN	2007	Taiwan
Mang Jing		LI Yang	2003	Hong Kong
Mang Zhong		Zhang Lu	2005	
Mu Bang		YU Guangyi	2006	China
Niupi Er		LIU Jiayin	2009	China
Petition-La Cour Des Plaignants	Petition-the Complainant's Courtyard	LIANG Zhao	2009	France
San...		DU Hai-bin	2007	China
Taiyang Zhao Chang Shengqui		Wen Jiang	2007	Hong Kong
Wan Mei Sheng Huo		Emily TANG	2008	Hong Kong
Xiao Wu		Jia Zhangke	1998	China
Yan Mo		YAN Yu	2005	China
Yang Yang	The One	CHENG Yu-chieh	2009	Taiwan
Yasukuni		LI Ying	2007	Japan
Ye Dian		Qing Yang	2008	China
Yihe Yuan		LOU Ye	2006	
Zuo You		Xiaoshuai WANG	2007	China

=== Leopards of Tomorrow ===
The Leopard of Tomorrow section, also known as the Pardi di Domani, features short and medium-length films. The following films were screened in the Leopard of Tomorrow section:

==== International Competition ====
International Competition – Leopards of Tomorrow
Original Title	English Title	Director(s)	Year	Production Country
Absent		Guillermo Asensio Alegre	2009	Spain
Alice Au Pays S'Émerveille	Alice in the Country Marvels	Marie-Eve Signeyrole	2009	France
Beast		Lars p Arendt	2009	Denmark
Believe		Paul Wright	2009	Great Britain
Brave Donkey		Gaysorn Thavat	2009	New Zealand
Diesis 1		Franke Frigo	2008	Italia
Edgar		Fabian Busch	2009	Germany
Gestreept	Striped	Jonas Baeckeland, Toon Mertens	2008	Belgium
Gjemsel	Hide	Aleksandra Niemczyk	2008	Norway
Kokon	Size	Till Kleinert	2009	Germany
Kurjuuden Kuningas	King of Misery	Mikko Myllylahti	2008	Finland
La Vie Commence	Life Begins	Émile Proulx-Cloutier	2009	Canada
Mandarin Peel		Anna McGrath	2009	Australia
Mira		Gregorio Graziosi	2009	Brazil
Mixtape		Peter Corina, Timothy S. Pfeffer	2009	USA
No Country For Chicken		Huang Huang	2008	China
Palmele	Palms	George Chiper	2009	Romania
Posledniy Den' Bulkina I.S.	The Last Day of Bulkina I.S.	Alexey Andrianov	2009	Russia
Six		Guillaume Giovanetti, Çağla Zencirci	2009	Japan
Siyur Mudrach	Ciur Money	Benjamin Freidenberg	2009	Israel
Túneles En El Río	Tunnels in the River	Igor Galuk	2009	Argentina
Um Dia Frio	A Cold Day	Claudia Varejão	2009	Portugal
Variaciok	Vary	Krisztina Esztergályos	2009	Hungary
Vivre Encore Un Peu...	Live a Little more ...	David Lambert	2009	Belgium

==== National Competition ====
National Competition – Leopards of Tomorrow
Original title	English title	Director(s)	Year	Production country
Brandstifter	Arsonist	Felix von Muralt	2009	Switzerland
Connie		Judith Kurmann	2009	Switzerland
Déjà		Antonin Schopfer	2009	Switzerland
Freud'S Magic Powder		Edouard Getaz	2009	Switzerland
Kiss Who		Riccardo Bernasconi	2009	Switzerland
Kitsch Panorama		Gilles Monnat	2009	Switzerland
La Salle Des Maîtres	The Master Hall	Tareq Daoud	2009	Switzerland
Las Pelotas	The Balls	Chris Niemeyer	2009	Switzerland
Le Téméraire	The Reckless	Lila Ribi	2009	Switzerland
Nachtspaziergang	Night Walk	Christof Wagner	2009	Switzerland
Schonzeit	Homemade	Irene Ledermann	2009	Switzerland
Vas-Y Je T'Aime	Go Ahead I Love you	Marie-Elsa Sgualdo	2009	Switzerland
À Côté	Next to	Basil Da Cunha	2009	Switzerland

=== Juries Film ===
The following films were screened in the Juries Film section:

Original Title	English Title	Director(s)	Year	Production Country
1958		Ghassan Salhab	2009	Lebanon
Al Mor Wa Al Rumman	Al -Murr and Al -Roman	Najwa Najjar	2009	
Bam Gua Nat		Hong Sang-soo	2008	South Korea
Bonne Nuit	Good Night	Valéry Rosier	2008	France
Carcasses		Denis Côté	2009	
En La Ciudad De Sylvia	In the City of Sylvia	José Luis Guerín	2007	Spain
Il Papà Di Giovanna	Giovanna's Dad	Pupi Avati	2008	
Je Pense A Vous	I Think of you	Pascal Bonitzer	2006	
Marseille		Angela Schanelec	2003	Germany
On Dirait Le Sud	It Looks Like the South	Vincent Pluss	2002	
Parque Via	Via Park	Enrique Rivero	2008	
Pescuit Sportiv	Hooked	Adrian Sitaru	2008	Romania
Romanzo Criminale	Criminal Novel	Michele Placido	2005	
Sabado	Saturday	Matías Bize	2003	
Serbis	Service	Brillante Mendoza	2008	
Sunday		Jonathan Nossiter	1997	
Tehran Bedoune Mojavez		Sepideh Farsi	2009	Iran
Yella	All	Christian Petzold	2007	

=== Here And Away ===
The following films were screened in the Here And Away section:

Original Title	English Title	Director(s)	Year	Production Country
Andrzej Wajda: Robmy Zdjecie!	Andrzej Wajda: Let's Take a Photo!	Maciej Cuske, Thierry Paladino, Marcin Sauter, Piotr Stasik	2008	Poland
Après La Chute	After the Fall	Hiner Saleem	2009	France
Baba'S Song		Wolfgang Panzer	2009	Switzerland
Berlin Berlin		Arnaud Gerber	2009	France
Blow Horn		Luis Miñarro	2009	Spain
Cordão Verde	Green Cord	Hiroatsu Suzuki, Rossana Torres	2009	Portugal
Custodi Di Guerra	War Custodians	Zijad Ibrahimovic	2009	Switzerland
Die Künstlerin Ingeborg Lüscher	The Artist Ingeborg Lüscher	Renata Münzel	2009	Switzerland
Dirty Paradise		Daniel Schweizer	2009	Switzerland
Et Mondana Ordinare	Et Mondana Order	Daniela Persico	2009	Italia
Grandi Speranze	Great Hopes	Massimo D'Anolfi, Martina Parenti	2009	Italia
Hana, Dul, Sed ...	Do Not, Over, Sed ...	Brigitte Weich	2009	Austria
Housing		Federica Di Giacomo	2009	Italia
Ich Bin Enric Marco		Santiago Fillol, Lucas Vermal	2009	Spain
Il Figlio Di Amleto	Hamlet's Son	Francesco Gatti	2009	Italia
Il Mio Cuore Umano	My Human Heart	Costanza Quatriglio	2009	Italia
In Between Days		Naomi Kawase, Isaki Lacuesta	2009	Spain
In Un Altro Mondo	In Another World	Joseph Péaquin	2009	Italia
Itiburtinoterzo		Roberta Torre	2009	Italia
Kataku No Hito	A Hard Person	Naomi Kawase	2003	Japan
Katyń		Andrzej Wajda	2007	Poland
Kaze No Matasaburo	Wind's Saburo	Kiyoshi Kurosawa	2003	Japan
L'Ultima Salita - La Via Crucis Di Beniamino Simoni A Cerveno	The Last Climb - The via Crucis by Beniamino Simoni in Cerveno	Elisabetta Sgarbi	2009	Italia
La Notte Quando È Morto Pasolini	The Night when Pasolini Died	Roberta Torre	2009	Italia
Le Temps Des Grâces	Graces Time	Dominique Marchais	2009	France
Les Arbitres	The Referees	Yves Hinant	2009	Belgium
Lignes De Front	Front Lines	Jean-Christophe Klotz	2009	France, Metropolitan
Lo Specchio	The Mirror	David Christensen	2009	Italia
Noi Che Abbiamo Fatto La Dolce Vita	We Who Made the Dolce Vita	Gianfranco Mingozzi	2009	Italia
Notas Flanantes	Note	Clarissa Campolina	2009	Brazil
Plastic And Glass		Tessa Joosse	2009	France
So Long No See		Véronique Goël	2009	Switzerland
Tatarak		Andrzej Wajda	2008	Poland
Terras	Lands	Maya Da-Rin	2009	Brazil
Tokage	Lizard	Shinya Tsukamoto	2003	Japan
Yakeato No Iesu	Yes of the Burnt Stones	Shinji Aoyama	2001	Japan

Here And Away - Anime Now

Original Title	English Title	Director(s)	Year	Production Country
Code Geass: Lelouch Of The Rebellion		Gorō Taniguchi	2006	
Gurren Lagann		Hiroyuki Imaishi	2007	
Mai Mai Miracle		Sunao Katabuchi	2009	Japan
One Piece Episode Of Chopper: Bloom In The Winter, Miracle Sakura		Junji Shimizu	2008	Japan
Pokémon Diamond & Pearl The Movie: Arceus And The Jewel Of Life		Kunihiko Yuyama	2009	
Tengen Toppa Gurren Lagann The Movie: The Lights In The Sky Are Stars		Hiroyuki Imaishi	2009	

Here And Away - Jeonju Digital Project 2009

Original Title	English Title	Director(s)	Year	Production Country
Butterflies Have No Memories		Lav Diaz	2009	
Koma	Arrival	Naomi Kawase	2009	
Lost In The Mountains		Hong Sang-soo	2009	South Korea

Here And Away - "D Generación" Program

Original Title	English Title	Director(s)	Year	Production Country
A.K.A Familia Nuclear	A.k.a Nuclear Family	Marc Igual	2009	
Alice In Hollywoodland		Jesús Pérez-Miranda	2007	
De La Hospitalidad, Derecho De Autor	Of Hospitality, Copyright	Miguel Amorim, Oriol Sánchez	2006	
Detesto El Sentimentalismo Barato	I Hate Cheap Sentimentality	Jorge Torregrosa	2003	
If The Camera Blows Up		Oscar Pérez	2008	
La Invasion	The Invasion	Gonzalo de Pedro Amatria	2009	
La Sortie	The Outing	Chus Domínguez	2008	
Limits: 1St Person		León Siminiani	2009	
Microscopías	Microscopies	Isaki Lacuesta	2003	
Miralls	Mirrors	Gerard Gil	2006	
Sempre Una Estranya	Always a Strange	Laia Ramos i Segura	2008	
Texas Sunrise		Lluis Escartín	2009	
The End		Fernando Franco	2009	
The Toro'S Revenge		Maria Cañas	2006	
Â¿Que Hago Yo Aqui?	What Do I Do Here?	Daniel Cuberta	2007	

Here And Away - Point ligne plan Program

Original Title	English Title	Director(s)	Year	Production Country
Conversations De Salon Ii	Living Room Conversations II	Danielle Arbid	2008	France
Notre Amour	Our Love	Arnold Pasquier	2009	France

Here And Away - Le Fresnoy Program

Original Title	English Title	Director(s)	Year	Production Country
En El Canal Sur De La Carreta M50	On the Southern Channel of the M50 Cart	Edgar Pedroza	2009	France
Traces		Yakup Girpan	2009	France

Here And Away / Leopards of Domani - Corti D'autore (Author's Shorts)

Original Title	English Title	Director(s)	Year	Production Country
Looking At Animals		Marc Turtletaub	2009	USA
Lost Dog		Sylvie Michel	2009	Germany
Mirror		Joachim Ladefoged	2009	Denmark
Nue		Catherine Bernstein	2008	France
Premier Anniversaire	First Birthday	Pascal Rambert	2009	France

=== Manga Impact ===
The following films were screened in the Manga Impact section:

Manga Impact - TV Series
Original Title	English Title	Director(s)	Year	Production Country
Armored Trooper Votoms		Ryōsuke Takahashi	1983	
Astro Boy		Noboru Ishiguro	1980	
Aura Battler Dunbine		Yoshiyuki Tomino	1983	
Black Jack		Satoshi Kuwabara	2004	
Blue Submarine N.6		Mahiro Maeda	1998	
Burst Angel		Koichi Ohata	2004	
City Hunter		Kenji Kodama	1987	
Code Geass: Lelouch Of The Rebellion		Gorō Taniguchi	2006	
Conan, The Boy In Future		Keiji Hayakawa, Hayao Miyazaki, Isao Takahata	1978	
Dirty Pair		Norio Kashima, Toshifumi Takizawa	1985	
Dororo		Gisaburō Sugii	1967	
Dragon Ball Gt		Osamu Kasai, Daisuke Nishio	1996	
Dragon Ball Z		Daisuke Nishio	1989	
Dragon Ball		Daisuke Nishio, Minoru Okazaki	1986	
Gto		Noriyuki Abe, Naoyasu Hanyu	1999	
Gurren Lagann	Gurren the Song	Hiroyuki Imaishi	2007	
Last Exile		Koichi Chigira	2003	
Marvelous Melmo		Tsunehito Nagaki	1971	
Nadia - Secret Of Blue Water		Hideaki Anno, Shinji Higuchi	1989	
Neon Genesis Evangelion		Hideaki Anno	1995	
Princess Knight		Kanji Akabori, Chikao Katsui	1967	
Revolutionary Girl Utena		Kunihiko Ikuhara	1996	
Saint Seiya		Kazuhito Kikuchi, Kozo Morishita	1986	
The Vision of Escaflowne		Kazuki Akane	1996	
The World of Japanese Animation
(A Long Day Of) Mr. Calpaccio		Urumadelvi	2005	Japan
5 Centimeters Per Second: A Chain Of Short Stories About Their Distance		Makoto Shinkai	2007	
A Blunt Sword		Jun'ichi Kōuchi	1917	
A Fox And A Badger In Rivalry		Ikuo Oishi	1933	
A Magic Pen		Masao Kumakawa	1946	
A Room With A View - A Story Concerning Borders Or Skin		Tetsuji Kurashige	2008	Japan
A Spider'S Thread		Noburō Ōfuji	1946	
A Story Of The Muku Tree		Shoji Maruyama	1947	
A Story Of Tobacco		Noburō Ōfuji	1924	
Agitated Screams Of Maggots		Keita Kurosaka	2006	Japan
Amanatsu	Amazing Summer	Toshihisa Yokoshima	2009	Japan
Arichan The Ant	Reaction the End	Mitsuyo Seo	1941	
Around		Ryu Kato	2007	Japan
Azur Et Asmar	Izor Etgmar	Michel Ocelot	2006	France
Barefoot Gen		Masaki Mori	1983	
Belladonna of Sadness		Eiichi Yamamoto	1973	
Black Cat's Meow		Noburō Ōfuji	1929	
Blassreiter	Pale Rider	Ichirō Itano	2009	
Broken Down Film		Osamu Tezuka	1985	
Bucci #1-3		Nijitaro .	2008	Japan
Cherry Blossoms		Kenzō Masaoka	1946	
Chinkoro Heibei'S Casket	Chincoro Habai	Noburō Ōfuji	1936	
Chorus		Arisa Wakami	2008	Japan
Clap Vocalism		Yōji Kuri	1962	
Cleopatra : Queen Of Sex		Osamu Tezuka, Eiichi Yamamoto	1970	
Coelacanth / Speculation For The Function Of Mother-Of-Pearl Line		Keiji Aiuchi	1985	Japan
Cowboy Bebop The Movie: Knockin' On Heaven'S Door		Shinichirō Watanabe	2001	
Cyborg 009: The Legend Of The Super Galaxy		Masayuki Akehi	1980	Japan
Dagger Of Kamui		Rintaro	1985	
Daicon Iii		Hiroyuki Yamaga	1981	
Daicon Iv		Hiroyuki Yamaga	1983	
Dojoji Temple		Kihachirō Kawamoto	1976	Japan
Evangelion: 1.0 You Are (Not) Alone.		Hideaki Anno, Masayuki, Kazuya Tsurumaki	2007	
Fit Song		Koichiro Tsujikawa	2006	Japan
Flcl		Masahiko Otsuka, Kazuya Tsurumaki	1999	
Fluffy		Miyuki Echigoya	2006	Japan
Fukuchan'S Submarine		Ryuichi Yokoyama	1944	
Gaki Biwa-Houshi	Gaki Biwa Serving	Reiko Yokosuka	2005	Japan
Galaxy Express 999		Rintaro	1979	Japan
Gantz		Ichirō Itano	2009	
Genius Party		Atsuko Fukushima, Yoji Fukuyama, Hideki Futamura, Shoji Kawamori, Shinji Kimura, Shinichirō Watanabe, Masaaki Yuasa	2007	Japan
Ghost in the Shell		Mamoru Oshii	1995	
Grave of the Fireflies		Isao Takahata	1988	
Grey Town		Yukihiro Tsujita	2001	
Gulliver'S Great Activities		Tokio Kuroda, Shigeyuki Ozawa	1950	
Hal & Bons Episode 1		Katsuhito Ishii, Sadamune Takenaka	2001	Japan
Hanamoski #1, 3	Hanamoski # 1, 3	Kitsune Akimoto	2005	Japan
Hells			2009	
His Snatched-Off Lump		Yasuji Murata	1929	
Horu	Mountain	Shiro Fujii	2005	Japan
House Of Flame		Kihachirō Kawamoto	1979	Japan
Jam		Mirai Mizue	2009	Japan
Jin-Roh: The Wolf Brigade		Hiroyuki Okiura	1998	
Jumping		Osamu Tezuka	1984	
Kill Bill Vol.1		Quentin Tarantino	2003	
Kimba the White Lion		Eiichi Yamamoto	1966	
Komaneko -The Curious Cat- The First Step		Tsuneo Gōda	2003	Japan
Little Norse Prince Valiant		Isao Takahata	1968	Japan
Mabo Fights Hard In The South Seas		Yoji Chiba	1942	
Mabo In The Tokyo Olympiad		Yoji Chiba, Ginjiro Sato	1936	
Madame Butterfly'S Fantasy		Kazugoro Arai, Nakaya Tobiishi	1940	
Memory Of Cell		Kazuhiro Sekiguchi	1992	Japan
Memory		Osamu Tezuka	1964	
Mermaid		Osamu Tezuka	1964	
Metropolis		Rintaro	2001	
Mind Game		Masaaki Yuasa	2004	
Mobile Suit Gundam Ii: Soldiers Of Sorrow		Yoshiyuki Tomino	1981	
Mobile Suit Gundam Iii : Encounters In Space		Yoshiyuki Tomino	1982	
Mofu Mofu	Moff Moff	Chii	2007	Japan
Muramasa		Osamu Tezuka	1987	
Mushishi	Salty	Hiroshi Nagahama	2005	
My Neighbors the Yamadas		Isao Takahata	1999	
National Anthem: Kimigayo		Noburō Ōfuji	1930	
Nausicaä Of The Valley Of The Wind		Hayao Miyazaki	1984	Japan
Ninja Boy Fireball: An Episode In Edo		Yoshi Tanaka	1935	
Nonsense Story Vol.1: Monkey Island		Kenzō Masaoka	1930	
Norabbits' Minutes Episode 2 Piano, Episode 3 Art & Skate		Yuchi Ito	2006	
Nostalgia		Tomoyasu Murata	2000	Japan
One Thousand And One Nights		Eiichi Yamamoto	1969	
Otaku No Video	Geek's Video	Takeshi Mori	1991	
Our Baseball Game		Yasuji Murata	1930	
Paper Films		Taku Furukawa	2006	Japan
Patlabor 2 - The Movie	CLOSED 2 - The Movie	Mamoru Oshii	1993	
Peeping Life		Ryouichi Mori	2009	Japan
Perfect Blue		Satoshi Kon	1998	
Pictures at an Exhibition		Osamu Tezuka	1966	
Poppoyasan: An Episode Of A Careless Stationmaster		Masao Kumakawa	1948	
Private Norakuro		Mitsuyo Seo	1935	
Push		Osamu Tezuka	1987	
Puss In Boots		Kimio Yabuki	1969	Japan
Royal Space Force - The Wings Of Honneamise		Hiroyuki Yamaga	1987	
Self-Portrait		Osamu Tezuka	1988	
Shellet #1-4		Junpei Mizokawa	2003	Japan
Ski Jumping Pairs		Riichiro Mashima	2002	Japan
Sol		Isao Nishigori, Takuya Yonezawa	2005	
Space Pirate Captain Harlock: Arcadia Of My Youth		Tomoharu Katsumata	1982	Japan
Space Runaway Ideon: Be Invoked		Yoshiyuki Tomino	1982	
Speed		Taku Furukawa	1980	Japan
Spirited Away		Hayao Miyazaki	2001	
Steam Head		Hiroyuki Nakao	1998	
Story of a Certain Street Corner		Osamu Tezuka	1962	
Summer Days with Coo		Keiichi Hara	2007	
Tekkonkinkreet	Tackkre	Michael Arias	2006	Japan
Tengen Toppa Gurren Lagann The Movie: Childhood'S End		Hiroyuki Imaishi	2008	
The Animatrix		Peter Cheung, Andy Jones, Yoshiaki Kawajiri, Takeshi Koike, Mahiro Maeda, Kōji Morimoto, Shinichirō Watanabe	2003	
The Battle Of The Malay Sea		Noburō Ōfuji	1943	
The Book Of The Dead		Kihachirō Kawamoto	2005	Japan
The Demon		Kihachirō Kawamoto	1972	Japan
The Diary Of Tortov Roddle Red Fruit		Kunio Katō	2003	
The Drop		Osamu Tezuka	1965	
The Life Of Ants		Yuko Asano	1994	Japan
The Phantom Ship		Noburō Ōfuji	1956	
The Sky Crawlers		Mamoru Oshii	2008	
The Tale Of Crab Temple		Hakuzan Kimura, Hidehiko Okuda, Tomu Uchida	1924	
The White Snake Enchantress		Taiji Yabushita	1958	Japan
The Wild Rose		Katsuo Takahashi	1978	Japan
Tokyo Onlypic 2008 Homeathlon		Tetsuro Kodama	2008	Japan
Tokyo Onlypic 2008 Kyodai Sumo	TOKYO LOY NICE C 2008 Giant Sumi	Hiroyuki Nakao	2008	Japan
Torachan And The Bride		Kenzō Masaoka	1948	
Tragedy Of Soft Ice Cream		Minoru Sugiyama	2008	Japan
Urashima Taro		Seitarō Kitayama	1918	
Voices of a Distant Star		Makoto Shinkai	2002	Japan
Well, That'S Glasses		Atsushi Wada	2007	Japan
Whale		Noburō Ōfuji	1952	
Wind		Nobuhiro Aihara	2000	Japan

=== Tribute To ===
The following films were screened in the Tribute sections:

Tribute To Alvaro Bizzarri
Original title	English title	Director(s)	Year	Production country
Lo Stagionale	The Seasonal	Alvaro Bizzarri	1971	
Pagine Di Vita Dell'Emigrazione-Estratti	Pages of Life of Emigration-Extract	Alvaro Bizzarri	1976	
Tribute To Rolf Gérard
Invitation to the Dance		Gene Kelly	1956	

=== Special Events ===
The following films were screened in Special Events:

Special Events - CISA
Original Title	English Title	Director(s)	Year	Production Country
From Festival To Cinema 1			2009	Switzerland
From Festival To Cinema 2			2009	Switzerland
Pippo Delbono Between Theater And Cinema
Gente Di Plastica	Plastic People	Christophe Bargues	2006	
Grido	Cry	Pippo Delbono	2006	Italia
Guerra		Pippo Delbono	2003	Italia
Her Bijit		Francesco Cabras, Alberto Molinari	1999	
Il Silenzio	Silence	Vitold Krysinsky	2005	France
L'India Che Danza	India that Dance	Pippo Delbono	2009	
Questo Buio Feroce	This Ferocious Darkness	Pippo Delbono	2008	Italia
The Love Factory #3 - Pippo Delbono - Bisogna Morire	The Love Factory #3 - Pippo Delbono - You Have to Die	Luca Guadagnino	2008	
Tutti Pazzi Per Pippo	All Crazy for Pippo	Antonello Agliotti	2009	
Swiss Cinema Rediscovered
Dilemma		Edmund Heuberger	1940	
Negresco Schimpansi		Wilhelm Eggert	1939	
The Cineteca Italian Presents
Lo Strano Viaggio Di Pim-Popò	The Strange Journey of Pim-Popo	Dante Cappelli, Giovanni Casaleggio	1922	Italia
Quel Fantasma Di Mio Marito	That Ghost of My Husband	Camillo Mastrocinque	1950	Italia
Vitus In Concert
Vitus		Fredi M. Murer	2006	

=== Prize Screenings ===
The following films were screened in Prize Screenings:

Ticino Cinema Prize
Original title	English title	Director(s)	Year	Production country
Heute Nacht Oder Nie	Tonight or Never	Daniel Schmid	1972	
Raimondo Rezzonico Prize To the Best Independent Manufacturer
Jeanne La Pucelle (Les Batailles/Les Prisons)	Jeanne La Pucelle (Battles/Prisons)	Jacques Rivette	1994	

== Independent Sections ==
=== Critics Week ===
The Semaine de la Critique is an independent section, created in 1990 by the Swiss Association of Film Journalists in partnership with the Locarno Film Festival. The following films were screened in Critics Week section:

Original Title	English Title	Director(s)	Production Country
44425		Alexander Gutman	Russia
Breath Made Visible		Ruedi Gerber	Switzerland
Crips, Strapped'N Strong		Mags Gavan, Joost Van der valk	Netherlands
El Milagro Del Papa	The Pope's Miracle	José Luis Valle	Mexico
Pianomania- Auf Der Suche Nach Dem Perfekten Klang	Pianomania- Looking for the Perfect Sound	Robert Cibis, Lilian Franck	Austria
The Moon Inside You		Diana Fabiánová	Spain
We Don'T Care About Music Anyway...		Cédric Dupire, Gaspard Kuentz	France

=== Appellation Swiss ===
The following films were screened in Appellation Swiss section:

Original Title	English Title	Director(s)	Year	Production Country
Body, Body, Blues		Isa Hesse-Rabinovitch	1986	
Brothers		Igaal Niddam	2008	Switzerland
Ceux De La Colline	Those of the Hill	Berni Goldblat	2009	Switzerland
Chrigi		Anja Kofmel	2009	Switzerland
Die Frau Mit Den 5 Elefanten	The Woman with the 5 Elephants	Vadim Jendreyko	2009	Switzerland
Die Standesbeamtin	The Registrar	Micha Lewinsky	2009	Switzerland
Du Bruit Dans La Tête	Noise in the Head	Vincent Pluss	2008	Switzerland
From Somewhere To Nowhere - On The Road In China With Photographer Andreas Seibert		Villi Hermann	2009	Switzerland
Geburt	Birth	Silvia Haselbeck, Erich Langjahr	2009	Switzerland
Happy New Year		Christoph Schaub	2008	Switzerland
Isa Hesse-Rabinovitch - Das Grosse Spiel Film	Isa Hesse -Rabinovitch - The Big Game Film	Anka Schmid	2009	Switzerland
Spiegelei	Fried Egg	Isa Hesse-Rabinovitch	1969	
Tandoori Love		Oliver Paulus	2008	Switzerland
Tell-Spott		Isa Hesse-Rabinovitch	1974	

== Official Awards ==
=== International Competition ===
- Golden Leopard: She, A Chinese directed by Xiaolu GUO
- Leopard for Best Actress: Lotte Verbeek in Nothing Personal
- Leopard for Best Actor: Antonis Kafetzopoulos in Akadimia Platonos
- Best Director: Alexei Mizgirev for BUBEN.BARABAN
- Special Jury Prize: Buben.Baraban directed by Alexei Mizgirev

=== Filmmakers of the Present Competition Jury ===
- Golden Leopard – Filmmakers of the Present Competition City of Locarno: The Anchorage directed by C.W. Winter and Anders Edström
- CinéCinéma Special Jury Prize, Filmmakers of the Present Competition: Piombo Fuso directed by Stefano Savona

=== Leopards of Tomorrow Jury ===
- Golden Leopard, George Foundation Prize for the Best Swiss Short Film: Las Pelotas directed by Chris Niemeyer
- Golden Leopard SRG SSR idée suisse Prize for the Best International Short Film: Believe directed by Paula Wright
- Silver Leopard Kodak Prize for the international Leopards of Tomorrow Competition: Variaciok directed by Krisztina Esztergályos
- "Action Light Prize" for the Best Swiss Newcomer: Connie directed by Judith Kurmann
- Film and Video Subtitling Prize: No Country For Chicken directed by Huang Huang
- Special Mention: Edgar directed by Fabian Busch

=== First Feature ===
- Leopard for the Best First Feature: Nothing Personal directed by Urszula Antoniak

=== Piazza Grande ===
- Prix du Public UBS: Giulias Verschwinden (Julia's Dissaperance) directed by Christoph Schaub
- Variety Piazza Grande Award: Same Same But Different directed by Detlev Buck

=== "Cinema e Gioventù" Youth Jury for the Leopards of Tomorrow section ===
- Prize "Cinema e Gioventù", Best Short Film for the international Competition Leopards of Tomorrow: Túneles En El Río directed by Igor Galuk
- Prize "Cinema e Gioventù", Best Short Film for the international Competition Leopards of Tomorrow (Spetial Mention): Gjemsel directed by Aleksandra Niemczyk
- Prize "Cinema e Gioventù", Best Short Film for the Swiss National Competition Leopards of Tomorrow: Kitsch Panorama directed by Gilles Monnat

=== Youth Jury ===
- Youth Jury First Prize: Nothing Personal directed by Urszula Antoniak
- Youth Jury Second Prize: La Donation directed by Bernard Émond
- "The environnement is the quality of life" Prize: La Donation directed by Bernard Émond
- "The environnement is the quality of life" Prize Special Mention: Buben.Baraban directed by Alexei Mizgirev

=== Ecumenical Jury ===
- Ecumenical Jury Prize: Akadimia Platonos directed by Filippos Tsitos
- Ecumenical Jury Prize Special Mention: Nothing Personal directed by Urszula Antoniak

=== Jury FIPRESCI ===
- FIPRESCI Prize: Nothing Personal directed by Urszula Antoniak

=== Jury CICAE -Prix Art & Essai ===
- CICAE Prize: Nothing Personal directed by Urszula Antoniak

=== Jury NETPAC (Network for the Promotion of Asian Cinema) ===
- NETPAC Prize:: Sham Moh directed by Yuhang Ho
- NETPAC Prize Special Mention: Ye Dian directed by Qing Yang

=== Jury FICC ===
- FICC/IFFS Prize: La Donation directed by Bernard Émond

=== SRG SSR idée suisse | Semaine de la critique Prize ===
- SRG SSR idée suisse/Critics Prize: Pianomania-Auf Der Suche Nach Dme Perfekten Klang directed by Lilian Franck and Robert Cibis
