= Van Roy =

Van Roy is a surname. Notable people with the surname include:

- Albertine Van Roy-Moens (1915–1987), Belgian gymnast
- Bernadette Van Roy (born 1948), Belgian middle-distance runner
- Frans Van Roy (fl. from 1972), Belgian academic and biologist
- Gaston Van Roy (1916–1989), Belgian sports shooter
- Johan Van Roy (fl. from 1986), Belgian founder of the music group Suicide Commando
- Karl Van Roy (1938–2022), American politician
- Mia Van Roy (born 1944), Flemish film and television actress
- Sand Van Roy (fl. from 2007), Dutch actress

== See also ==
- Van Roy Stadium
