= Ulaanbaatar Railway =

National railway operator of Mongolia

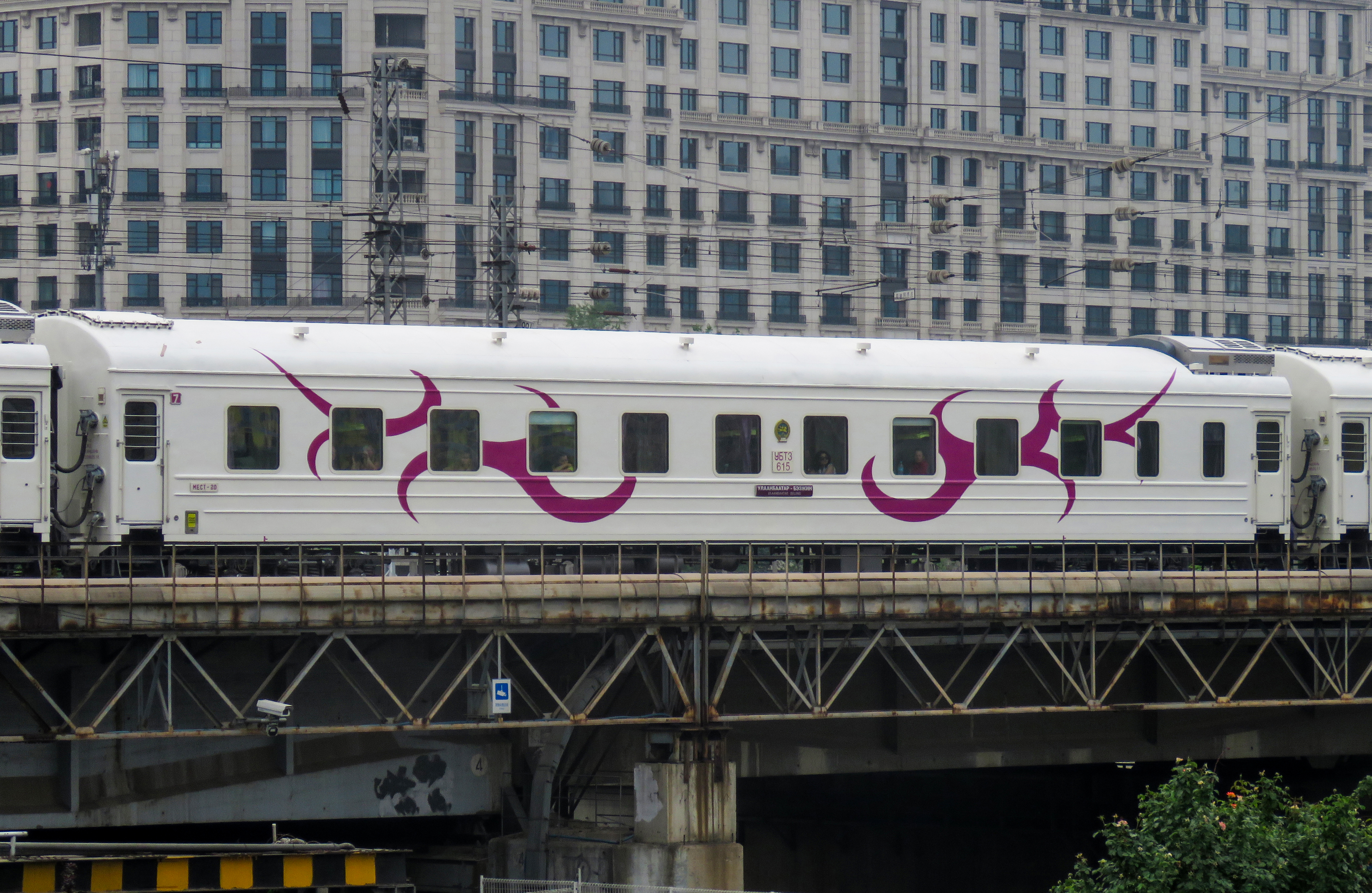
- Native name: Монгол, Оросын хамтарсан «Улаанбаатар төмөр зам» хувь нийлүүлсэн нийгэмлэг
- Type: Joint-stock company
- Industry: Railways
- Founded: 1949; 77 years ago
- Headquarters: Ulaanbaatar, Mongolia
- Area served: Mongolia
- Key people: Luvsandagva Purevbaatar (Chairman)
- Services: Passenger trains, rail transport, cargo
- Owner: Russian Government via Russian Railways (50%); Government of Mongolia (50%)
- Website: www.ubtz.mn

Ulaanbaatar Railway (Note: Mongolian: Улаанбаатар төмөр зам (УБТЗ), romanized: Ulaanbaatar tömör zam (UBTZ), pronounced [ʊɮámpátʰə̆r̥ tʰɵ́mɵ̆r̥ t͡sám (ʊ́‿pe‿tʰe‿tsʰe)]; Russian: Улан-Баторская железная дорога (УБЖД), romanized: Ulan-Batorskaja železnaya doroga (UBŽD)) (UBTZ), known officially as the Mongolian-Russian Joint Stock Company "Ulaanbaatar Railway", (Note: Монгол, Оросын хамтарсан «Улаанбаатар төмөр зам» хувь нийлүүлсэн нийгэмлэг, (УБТЗ ХНН)) is the national railway operator of Mongolia. It was established in 1949 as a joint venture between the Mongolian People's Republic and the Soviet Union. The company is jointly owned by the Mongolian and Russian government through Russian Railways, with each having a 50% stake.

Rail transport is an important means of travel in the landlocked country of Mongolia, which has relatively few paved roads. According to official statistics, rail transport carried 93% of Mongolian freight and 43% of passenger turnover in 2007. The Mongolian rail system employs 12,500 people. The national operator, UBTZ, is traditionally also known as Mongolian Railway (MTZ, Mongolian: Монголын төмөр зам). This can be a source of confusion, since MTZ is a distinct company established in 2008 to maintain UBTZ infrastructure. The Mongolian Railway College is located in Ulaanbaatar.

The infrastructure of UBTZ consists of 1,815 km of broad gauge lines. UBTZ employs 14,046 people, owns 110 locomotives and about 3,000 wagons. The UBTZ network consists of two main lines:

- the Sukhbaatar-Zamyn-Üüd line, running north to south;
- the Ereentsav-Choibalsan line.

== History ==
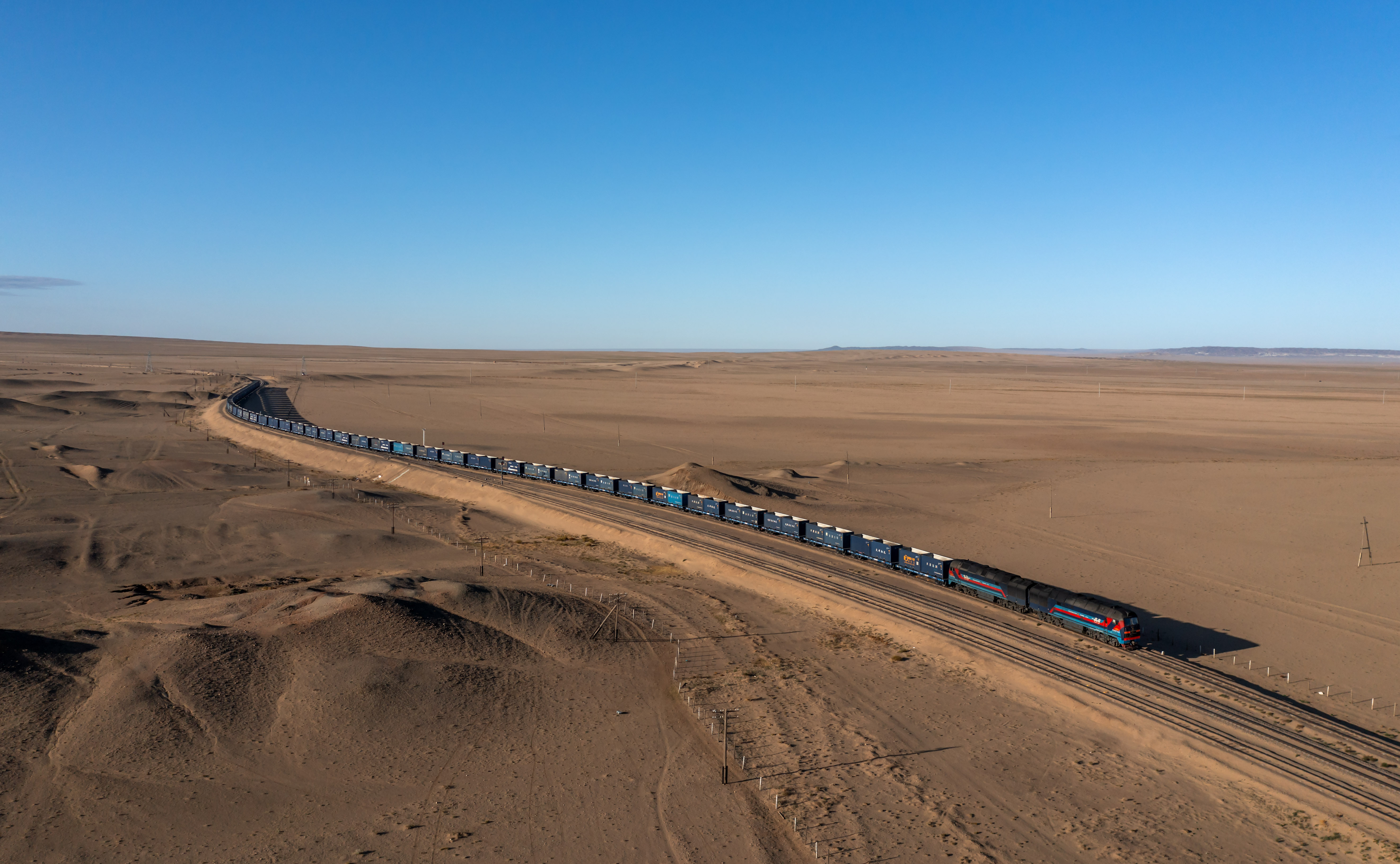
Ulaanbaatar Railway freight train near Sainshand, Dornogovi Province

The Trans-Mongolian Railway connects the Trans-Siberian Railway from Ulan-Ude in Russia to Erenhot and Beijing in China through the capital Ulaanbaatar. The Mongolian section of this line runs for 1,110 kilometres (690 mi). The Trans-Mongolian Railway runs through Mongolia on 1,520 mm (4 ft 11 27/32 in) Russian gauge track, changing to standard gauge track after entering China. There are several spur lines: to the copper combine in Erdenet, to coal mines in Sharyngol, Nalaikh and Baganuur, to the fluorspar mine in Bor-Öndör, to the former Soviet military base and refinery at Züünbayan. Another line links Züünbayan with Khangi on the Chinese border.

A separate railway line exists in the east of the country between Choibalsan and the Trans-Siberian at Borzya; however, that line is closed to passengers across the Mongolia-Russia border; passenger trains terminate at Chuluunkhoroot (Ereentsav). This line used to have a spur line to the uranium mine at Mardai, however this spur line was torn up and sold in the late 1990s/ early 2000s.

For domestic transport, daily trains run from Ulaanbaatar to Darkhan-1, Sukhbaatar, and Erdenet, as well as Zamyn-Üüd, Choir and Sainshand. Mongolia uses the 1,520 mm (4 ft 11 27/32 in) (Russian gauge) with a total system length of 2,810 kilometres (1,750 mi).

The Mongolian Railway (MongolRail) is slated to cover 7,588 kilometres (4,715 mi) by year 2025. The coverage track distance will get increased by 4,778 kilometres (2,969 mi). Mongolian railways transported 20.5 million tons of freight in 2013, which is close to the system's full capacity.

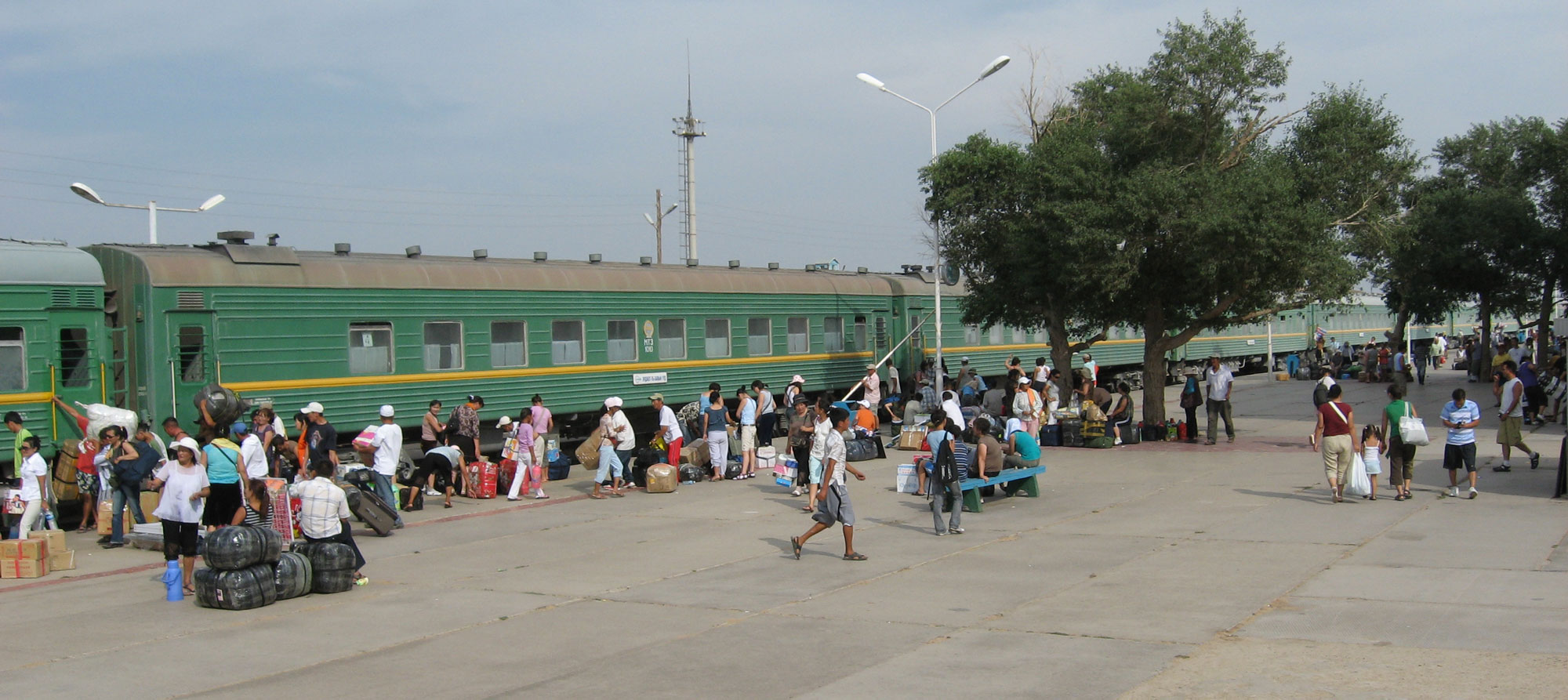
Traders in Zamyn-Üüd station, Dornogovi Province

Transporting transit cargo between Russia and China is an important source of revenue for the country's railway system; in addition to this, railways are used to transport domestic coal to power plants. As of November 2023, Tavantolgoi-Zuunbayan railway and the Khangi-Mandal crossing on Mongolia’s border with China has been completed adding 226.9 km (140 miles) across the south-east of Mongolia.

=== Proposed lines ===
Rail network in Mongolia

A 2010 Mongolian government plan proposed 5,683.5 kilometres (3,531.6 mi) of new track, for the primary purpose of connecting Dalanzadgad and Choibalsan, to be built in three stages:

- the first stage, totaling 1,100 kilometres (680 mi) and linking Dalanzadgad–Tavan Tolgoi mine–Tsagaan Suvarga mine–Züünbayan (400 km (250 mi)), Sainshand–Baruun-Urt (350 km (220 mi)), Baruun-Urt–Khööt mine (140 km (87 mi)), and Khööt–Choibalsan (200 km (120 mi));
- the second stage, totaling 900 kilometres (560 mi) and connecting the first stage with the Chinese border, linking Nariin Sukhait mine–Shivee Khüren (45.5 km (28.3 mi)), Tavan Tolgoi–Gashuun Sukhait (267 km (166 mi)), Khööt–Tamsagbulag–Nömrög (380 km (240 mi)), and Khööt–Bichigt (200 km (120 mi)); and
- the third stage, totaling 3,600 kilometres (2,200 mi)) and not described in detail, but including a link with Tsagaannuur on the Russian border and a line from Ulaanbaatar to Kharkhorin.

In 2012, a line connecting Erdenet–Mörön–Ovoot mine–Arts Suuri on the Russian border (547 km (340 mi)) was approved, but never built. In 2014, it was announced that the planned Tavan Tolgoi–Gashuun Sukhait and Khööt–Bichigt lines were to be of Chinese gauge, while the Dalanzadgad–Choibalsan, Khööt–Nömrög, and Erdenet–Artssuuri lines were to be of Russian gauge. In 2016, a line linking Züünbayan to Khangi on the Chinese border (280 km (170 mi)) was approved; it was completed in 2023. A 2017 government plan, greatly reduced in scope from the 2010 one, proposed linking Khööt–Choibalsan, Nariin Sukhait–Shivee Khüren, Khööt–Bichigt, and Züünbayan–Khangi.

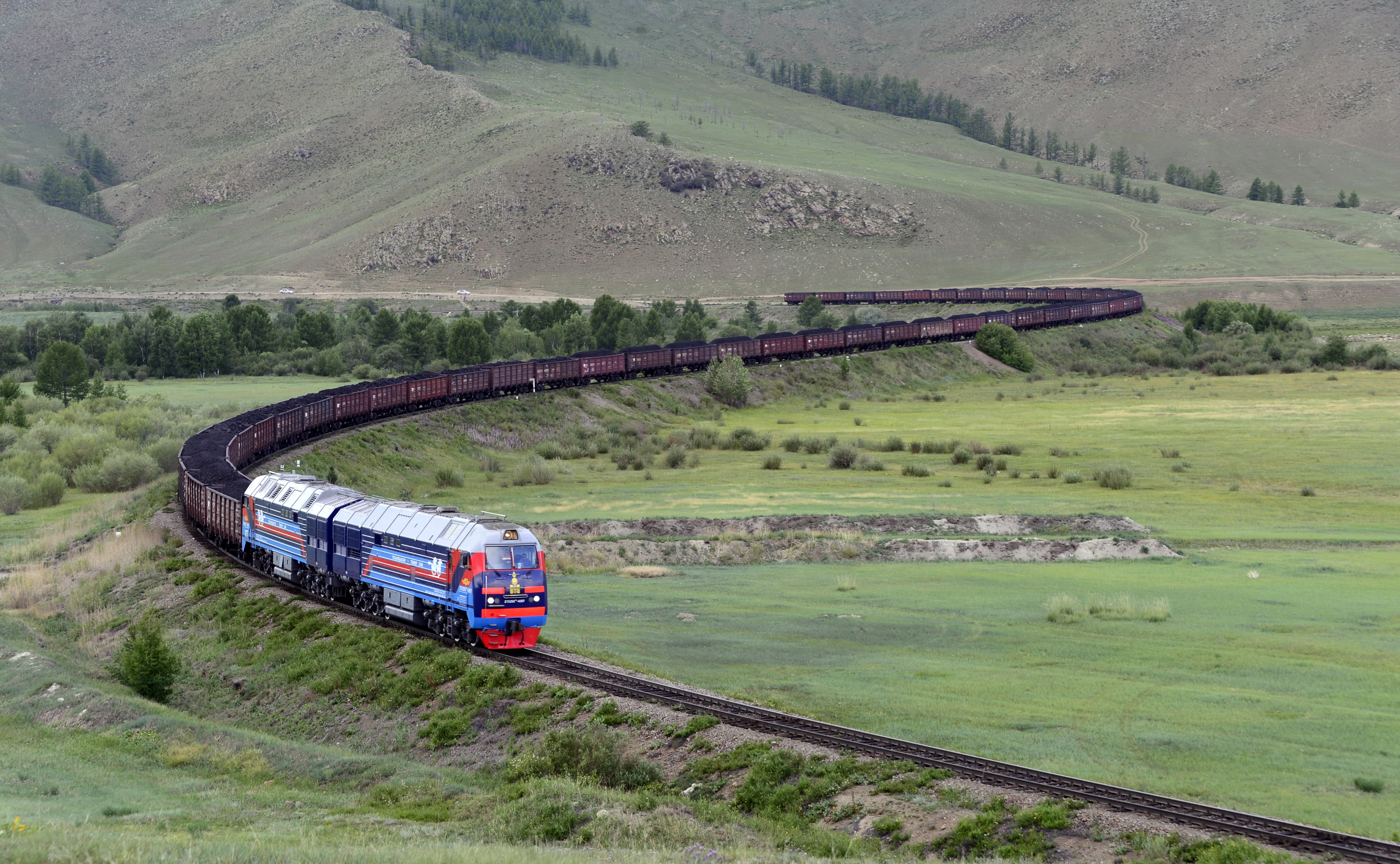
Ulaanbaatar Railway freight train transporting coal

== Rolling stock ==
As Mongolia's railroads are not electrified, UBTZ relies entirely on Diesel traction. Most common locomotives are M62 variants, including five rebuilt 2ZAGAL (two white horses) double engines. Other engines include TEM2 and TE116 variants, Dash-7 (DASH7) and two Evolution locomotive on lease from GE. In October 2010, Ulaanbaatar Railway ordered 31 2TE116UM diesel freight locomotives from Transmash.

== Maps ==
- UN Map(Dead link, 05.28.23)
- UNHCR Map(Dead link, 05.28.23)

== Tourist attractions ==
- Mongolian Railway History Museum

== See also ==
- Transport in Mongolia
