= Elias (film) =

Elias of het gevecht met de nachtegalen
- Directed by: Klaas Rusticus
- Written by: Fernand Auwera (dialogue), Maurice Gilliams (novel)
- Release date: 24 September 1991
- Running time: 80 minutes
- Country: Netherlands
- Language: Dutch

Elias of het gevecht met de nachtegalen (Elias, or the fight with the nightingales) is a 1991 Dutch film directed by Klaas Rusticus.

== Cast ==
- Lotte Pinoy as Hermine
- Bien de Moor as Aunt Henriette
- Viviane de Muynck as Aunt Zenobie
- Roland Ramaekers as Uncle Augustin
- Toon Brouwers as Father
- Marie-Louise Conings as Housekeeper
- Jimmi De Koning as Aloysius
- Brikke Smets as Elias
- Mia Van Roy as Mother
- Cara Van Wersch as Grandmother
