= Beyond Words (2017 film) =

2017 film

- Film poster
- Directed by: Urszula Antoniak
- Written by: Urszula Antoniak
- Starring: Jakub Gierszał
- Release dates: 8 September 2017 (TIFF); 11 January 2018 (Netherlands)
- Countries: Netherlands; Poland
- Language: Polish

Beyond Words is a 2017 Dutch-Polish drama film directed by Urszula Antoniak. It was screened in the Contemporary World Cinema section at the 2017 Toronto International Film Festival.

== Cast ==
- Jakub Gierszał as Michael
- Andrzej Chyra as Stanislaw
- Christian Löber as Franz
- Justyna Wasilewska
