= Code Blue (film) =

2011 film

- Directed by: Urszula Antoniak
- Written by: Urszula Antoniak
- Starring: Bien de Moor
- Cinematography: Jasper Wolf
- Edited by: Nathalie Alonso Casale
- Music by: Ethan Rose
- Distributed by: Wild Bunch Benelux
- Release date: May 15, 2011 (Cannes)
- Countries: Netherlands; Denmark
- Language: Dutch

Code Blue is a 2011 Dutch drama film written and directed by Urszula Antoniak and starring Bien de Moor. It premiered in the Directors' Fortnight section at the 2011 Cannes Film Festival.

== Cast ==
- Bien de Moor as Marian
- Lars Eidinger as Konrad
- Annemarie Prins as Willie
- Sophie van Winden as Anne
- Christine Bijvanck as Night nurse
- Hans Kesting as Doctor
