= Bien de Moor =

Belgian actress (born 1962)

Bien De Moor (born 11 June 1962) is a Belgian actress.

Born in De Pinte, she graduated at the drama course of "Studio Herman Teirlinck" in Antwerp.

Her role of Solange in the stage play De Meiden ("The Girl") gained her a Theo d'Or in 2005. For her performance in the controversial film Code Blue she was awarded as best actress at the Seville European Film Festival.

The short film Vera by Dutch filmmaker Thomas Korthals Altes, with Bien De Moor in the lead role, won the Grand Prix Award and the Best Short Award at the 2010 Tokyo Short Shorts Film Festival.

== Theatre ==
- Nachtwacht (2025) - NITE, Club Guy & Roni, HIIIT, Asko|Schönberg, NKK NXT
- Ocean Breeze (2024) - NITE
- ADI(C)SCO (2024) - Club Guy & Roni
- Yara’s Wedding (2023) - NITE en Schauspiel Hannover
- EXIT Macbeth (2022) - Noord Nederlands Toneel
- Witch Hunt (2022) - Noord Nederlands Toneel, Club Guy & Roni
- Before/After (2021) - NITE
- NITE Delivery (2021) - NITE
- Oom Wanja (2020) - Noord Nederlands Toneel
- Love (2019) - Club Guy & Roni, GöteborgsOperans Danskompani, Slagwerk Den Haag, Asko|Schönberg
- Brave New World 2.0 (2019) - NITE (NNT, Club Guy & Roni, Asko|Schönberg, Slagwerk Den Haag)
- Dorian (2018) - Noord Nederlands Toneel
- Salam (2018) - NNT, Club Guy & Roni, Asko|Schönberg
- Carrousel (2017) - Noord Nederlands Toneel / Club Guy & Roni / K[h]AOS
- Phaedra’s Love (2015) - Toneelschuur Producties / Nina Spijkers
- Dracula (2014) - De Tijd
- De bittere tranen van Petra von Kant (2011) - NT Gent, Het Nationale Toneel

== Selected filmography ==
- 1989: Marquis
- 1991: Elias
- 2011: Code Blue
- 2019: Nocturne
