= Chemirani Ensemble =

Persian classical music ensemble

The Chemirani ensemble is a Persian classical music ensemble.

The group is made of Chemirani family:

- Bijan Chemirani
- Djamchid Chemirani
- Keyvan Chemirani
- Maryam Chemirani

In 1988, the Chemirani Trio (Bijan, Keyvan and Jamshid) was established

== Works ==
Year	Work	Details
1989	Windhorse Riders	Djamchid's project with David Hykes - diaphonic singer
1991	LET THE LOVER BE	David Hykes with Persian zarb master Djamchid Chemirani; label: Auvidis
—	Vocal Calligraphy: the Art of Classical Persian Song	Vocals by: Alireza Ghorbani
1997	Zarb Duo et Solo	Keyvan
1997	Vents d'Est. Ballade pour une mer qui chante	Keyvan. Vol 1
1999	Trio de Zarb	Bijan, Djamchid, and Keyvan
2000	Alazar	Keyvan Chemirani, Montanaro, Rizzo
2001	Gulistan	Bijan's album with Ross Daly, multi-instrumentalist
2002	Qalam Kar	The entire trio
2002	Eos	Bijan's project
2003	Falak	Keyvan's album with Neba Solo - African belefon player
2003	Messatge. Keyvan Chemirani, Caro Rizzo, Saaba, Konomba Traore...Montanaro	Album Daqui
2004	Le Rhythme de la Parole I	Keyvan
2004	Kismet	Bijan's album with Stelios Petrakis on Buda Musique records
2005	Urna: Amilal	Keyvan and Djamchid with Mongolian singer "Urna"
2005	Ross Daly: Microkosmos	Supported by Chemirani
2006	Le Rhythme de la Parole II	The Rhythm of Speech Vol. 2 - features all three Chemirani with Iranian, African, and Indian accompaniment
2007	Battements Au Cœur De l'Orient	Heartbeat of the Orient - Keyvan's project with Anindo Chatterjee, tabla; also includes Maryam Chemirani as vocalist
2011	Invite	Lineup: Djamchid Chemirani, zarb, vocal; Keyvan Chemirani, percussions; Bijan Chemirani, percussions; Ballaké Sissoko, kora; Omar Sosa, piano; Renaud Garcia-Fons, bass; Ross Daly, lyra, rebab; Sylvain Luc, acoustic guitar; Titi Robin, bouzouki
2015	Dawâr	

== See also ==
- Hamavayan Ensemble
- Aref ensemble
- Dastan ensemble
- Kamkar ensemble
- Mastan Ensemble
