= Nathalie Alonso Casale =

French actress

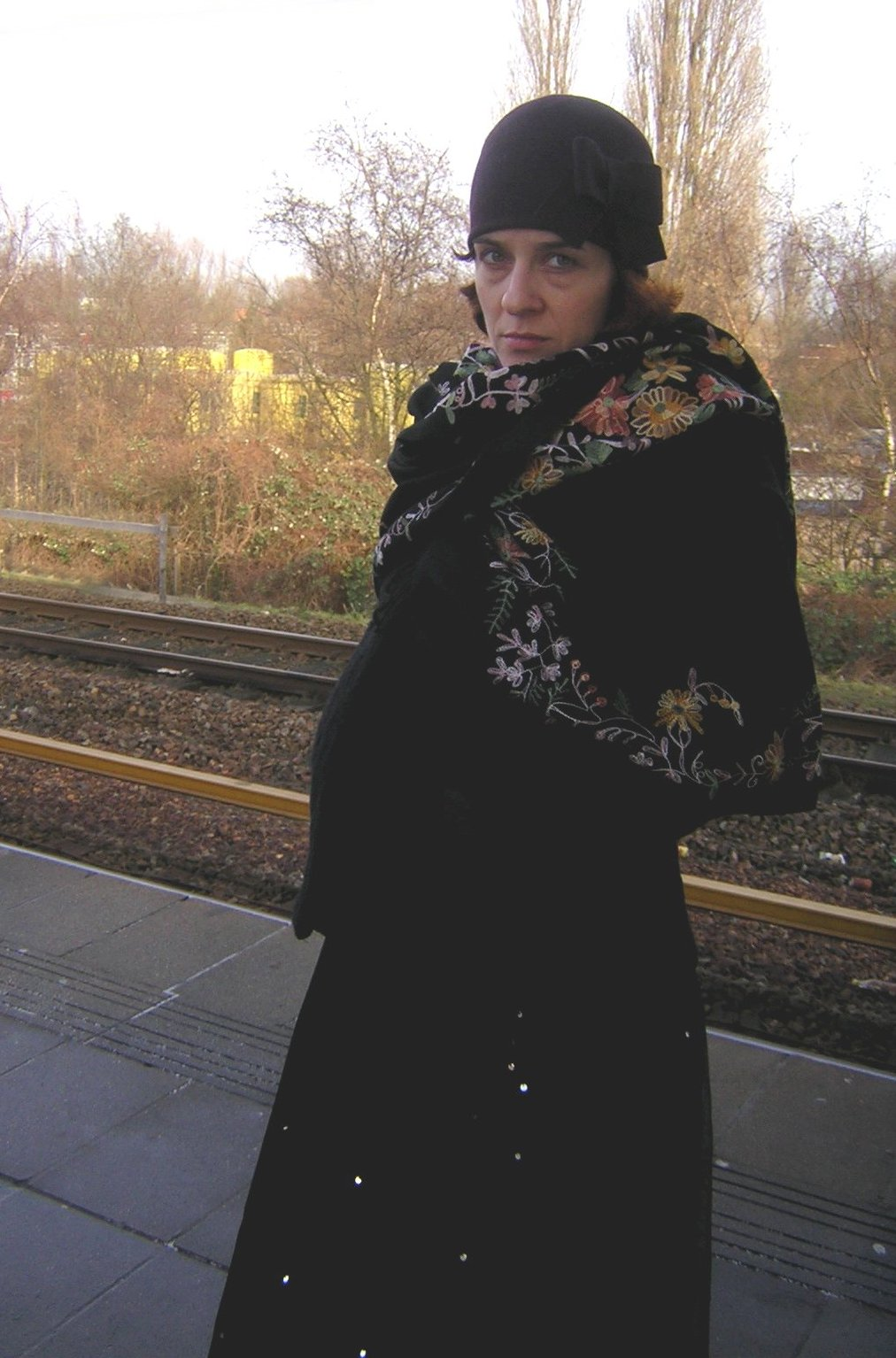
- Born: 1970 (age 55–56); Paris, France
- Occupations: film actress; film editor; film director
- Awards: Golden Calf for Best Short Film (1992)

Nathalie Alonso Casale (born 1970 in Paris, France) is a film actress, film editor and film director who won the 1992 Golden Calf for Best Short Film.

== Partial filmography ==
Sources

- Het is een schone dag geweest (1994) - Film editor
- Krima/Kerime (1995) - Film editor
- HKG (1999) - Film editor
- Man looks at Woman, Woman looks at Man (2000) - Film director, editor, and cast member.
- Nothing Personal (2009 film) - Film editor
- Code Blue (2011)
