= 2TE116 =

Broad gauge double diesel locomotive

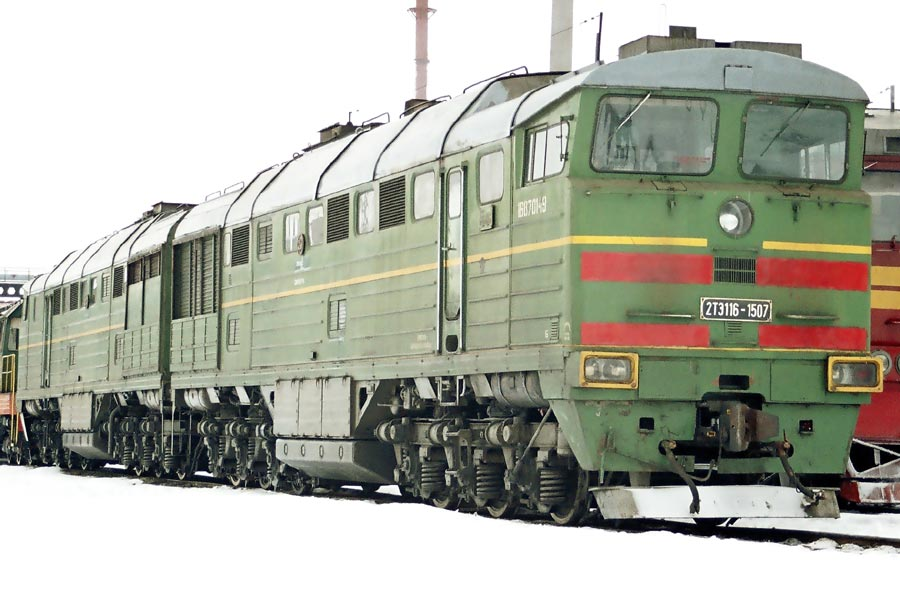
- 2TE116-1507
Type and origin
- Power type: Diesel-electric
- Builder: Luhanskteplovoz
- Total produced: 2176
Specifications
- Configuration
  - UIC: Co-Co+Co-Co
- Gauge: 1,520 mm (4 ft 11 27/32 in)
- Loco weight: 272 t (268 long tons; 300 short tons)
Performance figures
- Maximum speed: 100 km/h (62 mph)
- Power output: 4,500 kW (6,035 hp)
Career
- First run: 1971

The 2TE116 is a broad gauge double diesel locomotive manufactured by Luhanskteplovoz, used extensively to haul heavy freight trains in the Soviet Union and its successor states, particularly by RZD.

Variants are still being sold by Transmash; Ulaanbaatar Railway placed an order for 35 in October 2010.

The 2TE116U is a successor.

== Gallery ==
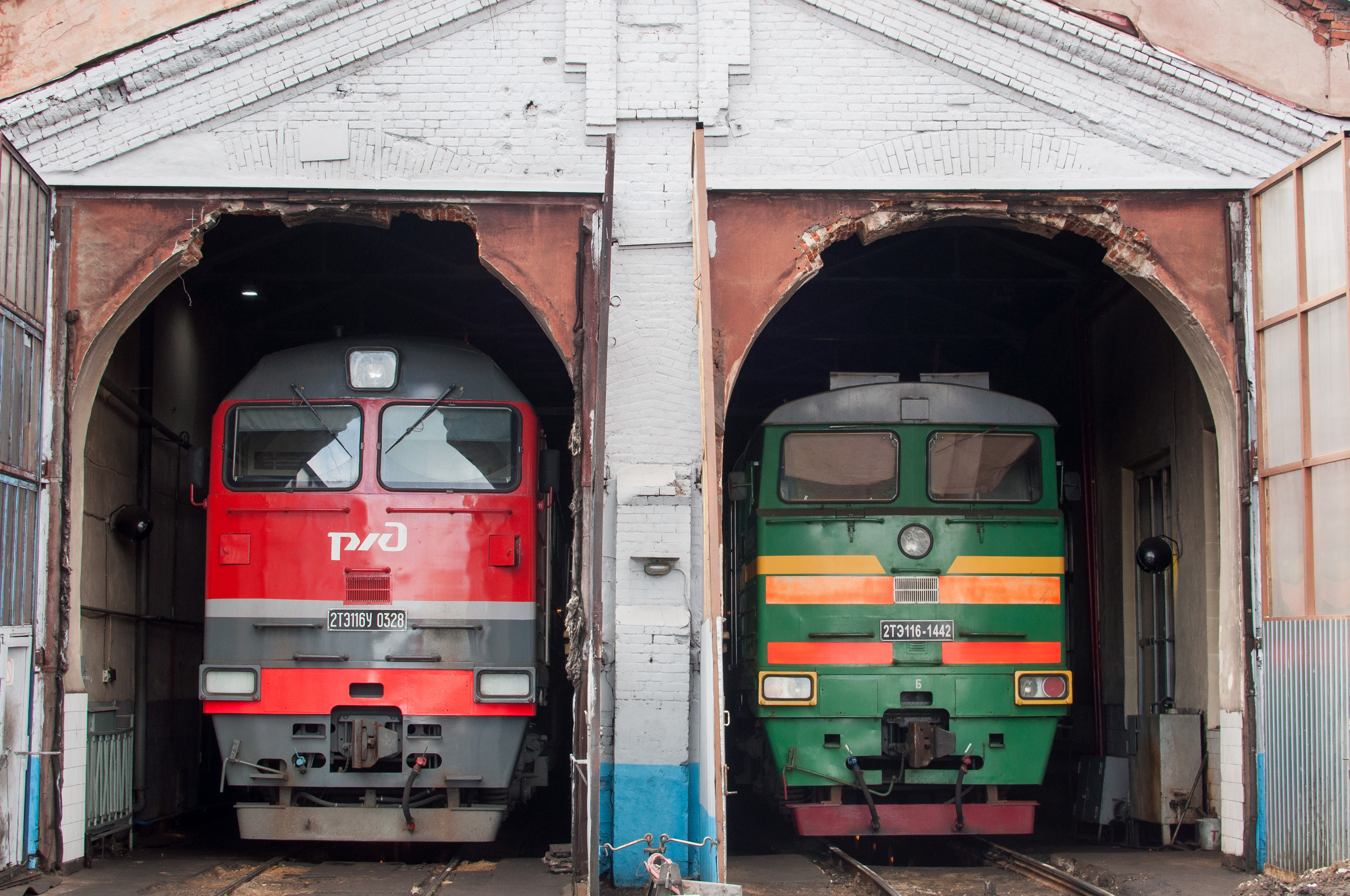
2TE116U (left) and 2TE116 (right)

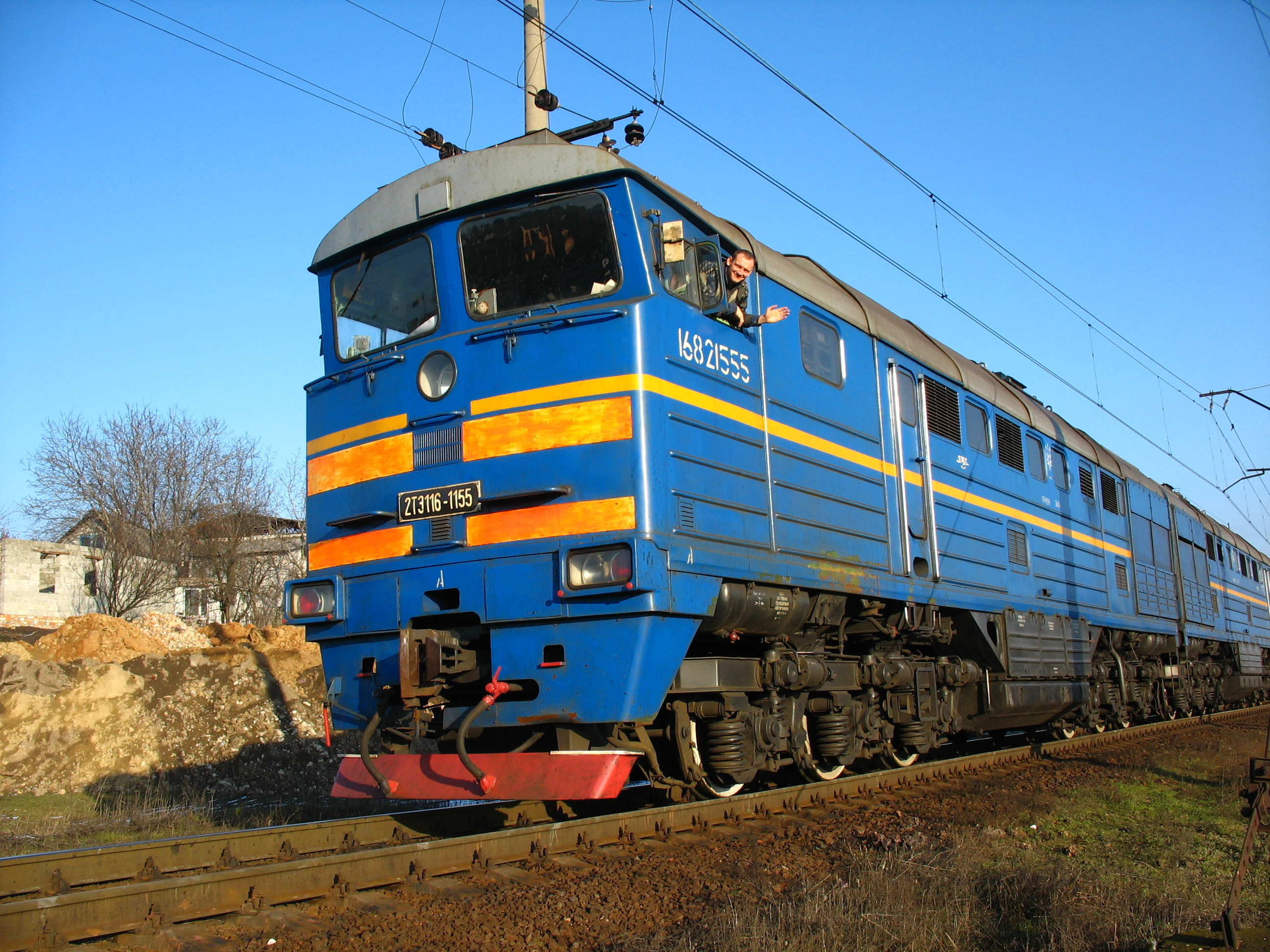
2TE116-1155

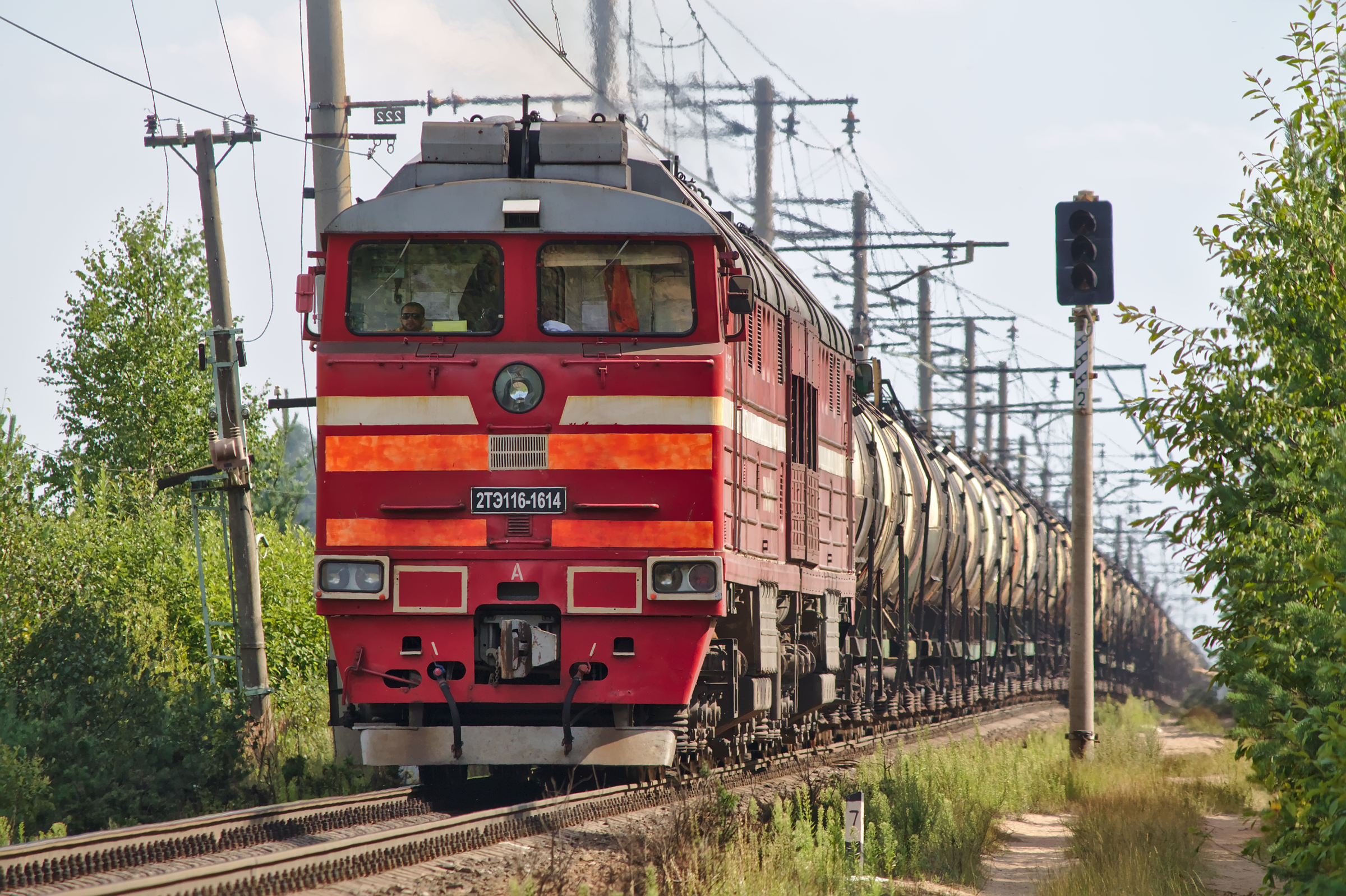
2TE116-1614

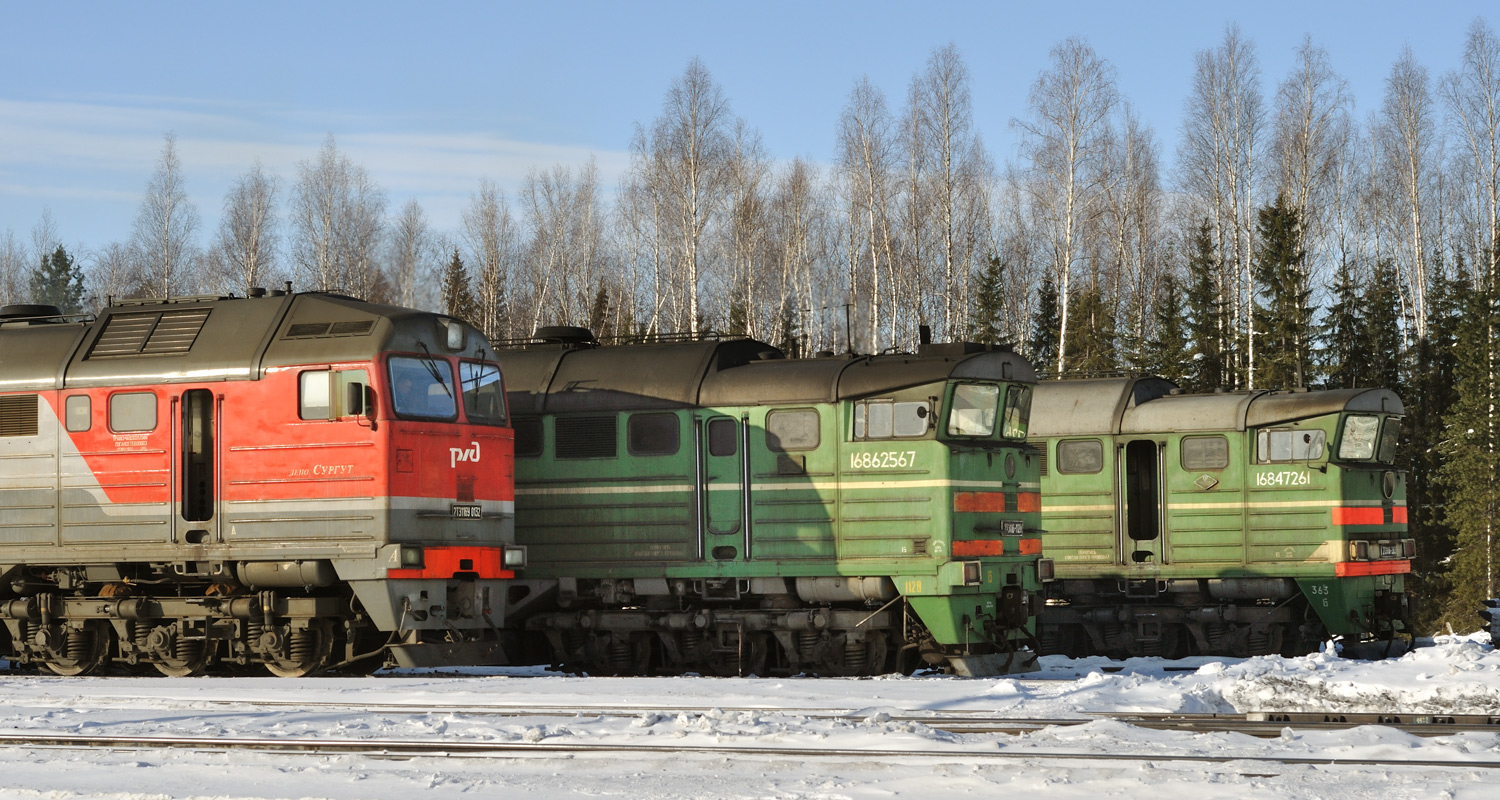

== See also ==
- The Museum of the Moscow Railway, at Paveletsky Rail Terminal, Moscow
- Rizhsky Rail Terminal, Home of the Moscow Railway Museum
- Varshavsky Rail Terminal, St.Petersburg, Home of the Central Museum of Railway Transport, Russian Federation
- History of rail transport in Russia
