= Urna (singer) =

Mongol singer (born 1969)

URNA
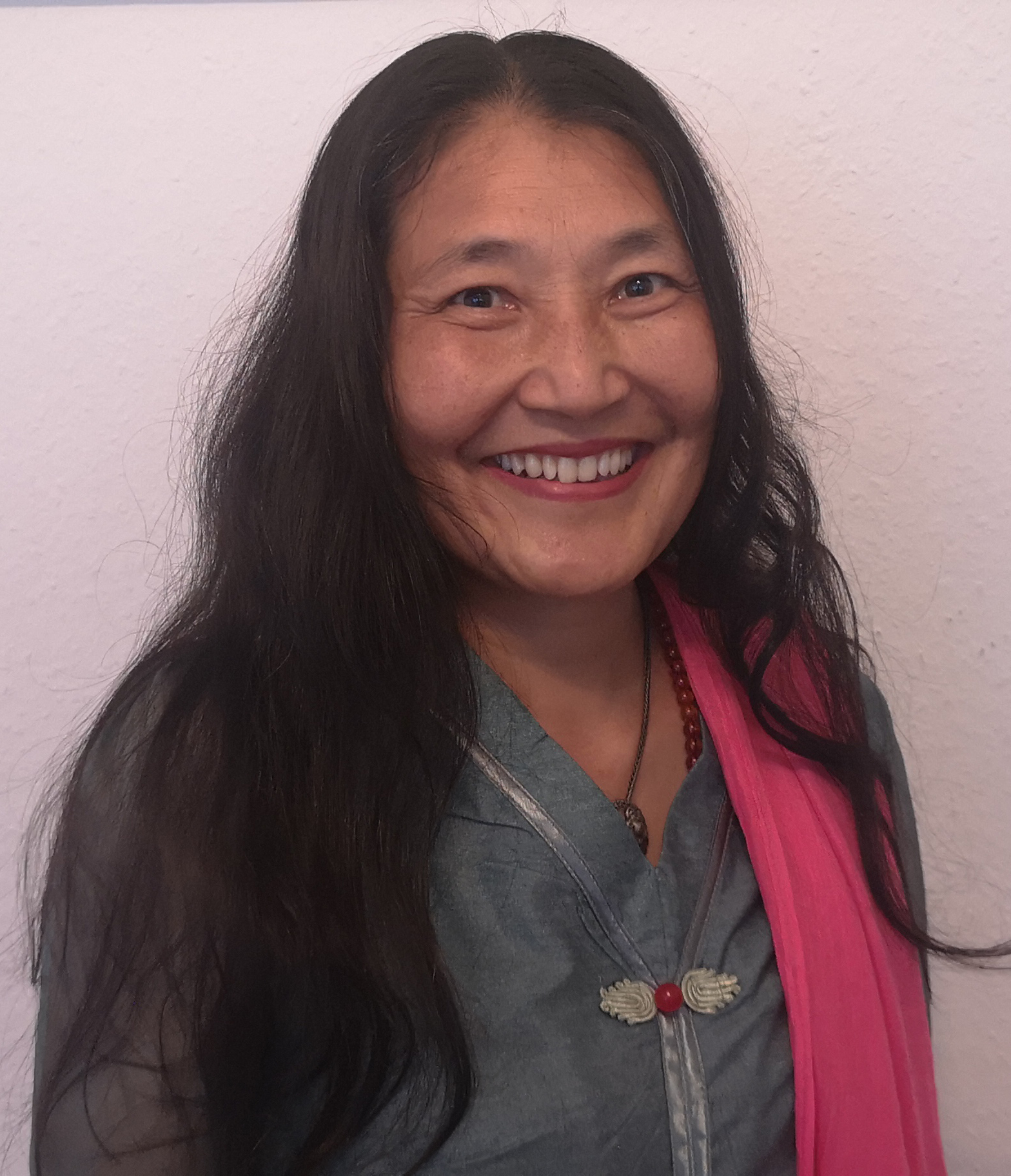

Background information
- Born: 1969 (age 55–56); Ordos, Inner Mongolia, China
- Instrument: Yangqin
- Website: www.urna.com

Mongolian name
- Mongolian Cyrillic: Урнаа Цахар Тугчи
- Mongolian script: ᠤᠷᠠᠨᠠ ᠴᠠᠬᠠᠷ ᠲᠤᠭᠴᠢ

Urna Chahar-Tugchi (born 1969), known mononymously as Urna (stylized in all caps), is a Mongol singer and yangqin player from Inner Mongolia, China. She currently lives in Bavaria, Germany.

== Biography ==
Urna was born into a family of herders in the grasslands of the Ordos Plateau in Inner Mongolia, a society where song was a ubiquitous part of everyday life. Her first musical training was learning to play the yangqin – the Chinese dulcimer – from a Shanghai Conservatory of Music professor who was visiting Hohhot, the capital of Inner Mongolia. Then, at the age of 18, she moved to study at the Shanghai Conservatory, a challenging step since she had no knowledge of the Chinese language.

She now performs around the world, and is based in Bavaria, Germany. In 2003, she was awarded the RUTH prize in Germany for Best International Artist.

== Discography and filmography ==
Urna has produced seven albums of music on CD:

- 1995 – Tal Nutag (13 tracks) – with Robert Zollitsch (zither) and Oliver Kälberer (guitar, mandolin) – recorded in a Bavarian church, Mongolian songs and improvisations
- 1997 – Crossing
- 1999 – Hödööd (11 tracks) – with Robert Zollitsch (zither, vocal, percussion), Wu Wei playing the Sheng and Sebastian Hilken playing the cello and the frame drum – Mongolian songs and original compositions
- 2001 – Jamar (10 tracks) – with Robert Zollitsch playing the zither and throat-singing, Morin khuur-virtuoso Burintegus and Ramesh Shotham (Indian percussion) – lyrics in Chinese and Mongolian
- 2002 – Hodood
- 2004 – Amilal (13 tracks) – with Djamchid and Keyvan Chemirani, Zarb percussionists from Iran and Zoltan Lantos (Violin) – a personal record of her travels and her world view
- 2012 – Portrait d'URNA: Tenggeriin Shivuu
- 2018 – Ser (12 tracks) – with Kroke

She is also featured in the film Two Horses of Genghis Khan.

== Reception ==
Andrea Murray's description in The Herald-Times of one of her performances gives an intriguing insight into the extraordinary characteristics of her singing:

She sang like a child, like a banshee, like a warrior, like a lost lamb, like a horse trader .... when the last note was gone, the silent audience stood up and cheered.
