= Klaas Rusticus =

Dutch author and television and film director

Klaas Rusticus (born October 25, 1942, in Sneek) is a Dutch author and television and film director.

== Professional biography ==
Born in the Frisian-Dutch town of Sneek he studied at the educational academy in his hometown, worked as a primary school teacher (1962–1968) and attended lectures on cultural pedagogy at Amsterdam University (1965–66). In 1966 he wrote and directed "Sephantijn", a multi-theatrical performance with 150 school children and a number of professional musicians and filmers. As this work was televised by Dutch broadcaster NCRV this production marked the start of his television career. Invited by NCRV television he followed courses in TV-, studio- and film direction at Dutch Media Academy in Hilversum (1969–70), being responsible for dozens of youth-, drama- and arts productions in the years that followed until 1977, when he left NCRV.

After some years of incidental productions for WDR (Germany), VARA and VPRO (both Dutch) he worked as a freelance script writer and program maker for the NOS (Dutch) Television Arts Department between 1980 and 1990, occasionally being invited as a guest director for foreign broadcasting organizations and as a guest lecturer during master classes.

From 1990 he only worked abroad, making art productions for ZDF/BR/SFB/WDR/SWR (Germany), Arte (France/Germany), 3Sat (Germany/Austria/German-speaking Switzerland) and Č(S)T (Czech Republic/Czechoslovakia). A number of his (mainly music) productions have been, and are still being broadcast all over the world. Among concert productions televised under his direction were performances by the Royal Concertgebouw Orchestra, the Rotterdam and The Hague Philharmonic orchestras, the European Union Youth Orchestra, the Philharmonia Orchestra (London), the BBC Welsh Symphony Orchestra, the Orchestra of the Eighteenth Century, the Berliner Philharmoniker, the Staatskapelle Dresden, the Wiener Symphoniker, the orchestras of Bavarian, North-German and Berlin broadcasters and the orchestra of Mariinski theatre in Saint Petersburg, conducted by a.o. Claudio Abbado, Wolfgang Sawallisch, Riccardo Chailly, Daniel Barenboim, Sir Neville Marriner, Sir Simon Rattle, David Zinman, Leonard Bernstein, Giuseppe Sinopoli, Frans Brüggen, Luciano Berio, Vladimir Ashkenazy, Sir Colin Davis, Seiji Ozawa, Valery Gergiev and Yakov Kreizberg.

As an author he wrote many short stories, TV-drama scripts, (mainly children’s) songs and the novel Twee (Two), together with the author Simen de Jong (2010).

== Private life ==
Klaas Rusticus and his wife Helena Cornelia de Schipper (1944–2009), from whom he separated in 1984, have two daughters, Nynke (*1970) and Rozemarijn (*1975).

== Filmography ==
Main productions:

- Sephantijn (1966) (theatre) (NCRV)
- Orimoa (29 episodes 1971 -1975) (NCRV)
- Pandura’s Drum (26 parts -1976)(NCRV))
- Boete dwaen (Penitence) (1977) (NCRV) (first TV-dramaproduction in the Frisian language)
- Professor Stranger (6 episodes 1977)(NCRV)
- A Dog’s Life (1978)(Theaterunie)
- The Illusion (1979) (VPRO)
- The Children’s Cruisade (1981) (theatre-church the Laborinth)
- Toy of the Winds (1981)(WDR)
- Works of Loneliness (1982)(SWF)
- Over and Out (1983) (NOS)(Prix Futura-nomination Berlijn 1985)
- The thousand cherry-trees of Yoshitsune (1985)(NOS) (Kabuki-theatre)
- Brundibár (1989) (NOS/HR/ČST/ORF/SRG)
- Elias or the battle with the nightingales (1992) (NOS/BRTN)(CIDALC-award for best literary movie - Festival *Figueira da Foz 1992)
- The Seasons (Haydn) (1993) (ZDF/Arte/ 3Sat/ORF/SRG)(characterized by ZDF as one of the highlights of the 20th century)
- Trnová koruna z pampelišek / eine Krone aus Löwenzahn / Dandelion Crown (1993)(ČT/ZDF/3Sat/arte/ORF/SRG)(Prix d’Innovation-nomination Monte Carlo -1994)
- A Salome comes home (1995)(3Sat)
- I will be home late (1996) (Arte)
- The voice on wings (2003) (Fobic Films)
