= Frans Van Roy =

Belgian molecular biologist

Frans Van Roy is a Belgian molecular biologist and professor at the University of Ghent (Ghent, Belgium). He is head of the VIB Department for Molecular Biomedical Research, UGent. His research interest is on the molecular mechanisms underlying the pathology and the cure of cancer and inflammation-related disorders.

In 1972 he joined the Laboratory of Molecular Biology of Prof. Walter Fiers, and he obtained a PhD in 1978. Frans Van Roy has been the VIB Group leader since 1996. He has also been the Scientific Director of the VIB Department for Molecular Biomedical Research, UGent, since 1997. In 2002, he became the chairman of the Department of Molecular Biology of the University of Ghent.

== Sources ==
- Frans Van Roy (VIB)
- Department for Molecular Biomedical Research (DMBR)
