= Mardai =

Coordinates: 49°06′N 114°12′E

Mardai is an abandoned uranium mining town located in Dornod Province, Mongolia, in a remote area north of Choibolsan.

The Dornod area was prospected for uranium ore by the Soviet Union beginning in the late 1940s. In 1972, a Soviet geological expedition discovered significant uranium reserves and in 1988 the Erdes Mining Enterprise began operation. Mardai was a "secret city" that housed the mine's Russian engineers and technical staff. Mining stopped in 1993 following the fall of the Soviet Union and Mardai, which had housed about 10,000 Soviet personnel, was completely abandoned. Local Mongolian people then scavenged the city for building materials, leaving behind a ruined ghost town.

The geology consists of the Lower Cretaceous Zuunbayan Formation, composed of lignite-bearing continental sediments, and the underlying Upper Jurassic-Lower Cretaceous continental sediments and volcanic rocks. The volcanics consist of rhyolite, basalt, trachyandesite, and trachyrhyolite. Uranium ore bodies are found in the Dornod, consisting of coffinite and pitchblende.
