= Gaysorn Thavat =

New Zealand film director

Gaysorn Thavat is a New Zealand film director.

== Biography ==
Thavat's first job in the film industry was as a clapper loader, in 1995, and she worked her way up to assistant camera operator. In 2004 she began directing television commercials, and in 2009 she won a Golden Lion award for a breast cancer commercial. She later moved into directing episodic television and films and in 2009 she directed her first short film, Brave Donkey. In 2019 she directed her debut feature film The Justice of Bunny King starring Essie Davis and Thomasin McKenzie, which premiered at Tribeca International Film Festival in 2021. Thavat was nominated for the Nora Ephron award with Davis and McKenzie both awarded for outstanding performances.

== Filmography ==
Year	Title	Role	References
2021	The Justice of Bunny King	Director	
2019	The Gulf	Director	
2019	Fresh Eggs	Director	
2009	Brave Donkey	Director	
