= Nothing Personal (2009 film) =

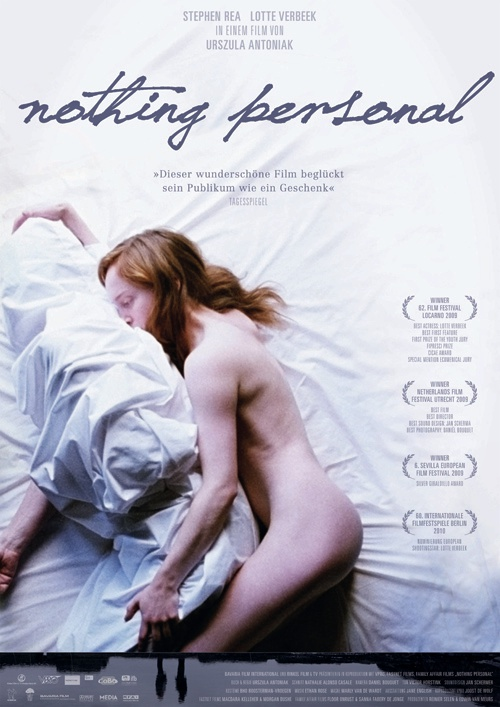
- theatrical poster
- Directed by: Urszula Antoniak
- Written by: Urszula Antoniak
- Produced by: Edwin van Meurs; Reinier Selen
- Starring: Lotte Verbeek; Stephen Rea
- Cinematography: Daniel Bouquet
- Edited by: Nathalie Alonso Casale
- Music by: Ethan Rose
- Production companies: Rinkel Film & TV Productions BV
- Distributed by: Cinema Delicatessen
- Release date: 14 August 2009
- Running time: 84 minutes
- Countries: Netherlands; Ireland
- Languages: English, Dutch

Nothing Personal is a 2009 Dutch-Irish drama film written and directed by Urszula Antoniak. It was presented at the Locarno International Film Festival for the international competition. It won the Golden Leopard for best debut film and Lotte Verbeek won the award for best actress. The film won four Golden Calves at the Dutch Film Festival of 2009, including best film.

== Plot ==
Following a recent separation, a young woman hitchhikes through the Irish countryside. She meets Martin, a solitary widower living on a peninsula, who offers her shelter and food in exchange for her work around the house. Initially reluctant, she agrees under the condition that he won't pry into her personal life. When asked for her name, she tells him to simply call her "You."

Despite their vow to stay purely professional, their relationship deepens through shared work, meals, and music. Martin's curiosity prompts him to search through her belongings, and he finds out that her name is Anne Dijksen. He visits her apartment in Amsterdam. Meanwhile, she discovers Martin's Emergency Service Medal, shedding light on his history.

Upon his return, Martin conveys to Anne that he visited her apartment by handing her a hairpin he found there. Anne is set aback and prepares to leave. While bidding farewell, Anne says that like him, she wishes to live all by herself. She enters his bed but he stops her advances, saying he won his medal by "knowing when to stop."

They return to their daily chores, caressing each other's hands during a break. The next morning, Anne discovers that Martin unexpectedly died, leaving a letter addressed to "You" expressing remorse for leaving her behind and entrusting his home to her. Anne wraps him up in the bedding and spoons him naked.

The film ends with Anne checking into a simple Spanish hotel. She tells the receptionist that she has no luggage and lays down on the bed.

== Reception ==
On Rotten Tomatoes it has an approval rating of 82% based on reviews from 11 critics. On Metacritic it has a score of 71% based on reviews from 6 critics.

Derek Elley of Variety was critical of the script but says the film succeeds "Largely thanks to Verbeek's performance, full of physical grace notes and small details, she manages to involve the audience, even though her character is more a movie creation than one based in real psychology."
