= Urszula Antoniak =

Polish-Dutch film director (born 1968)

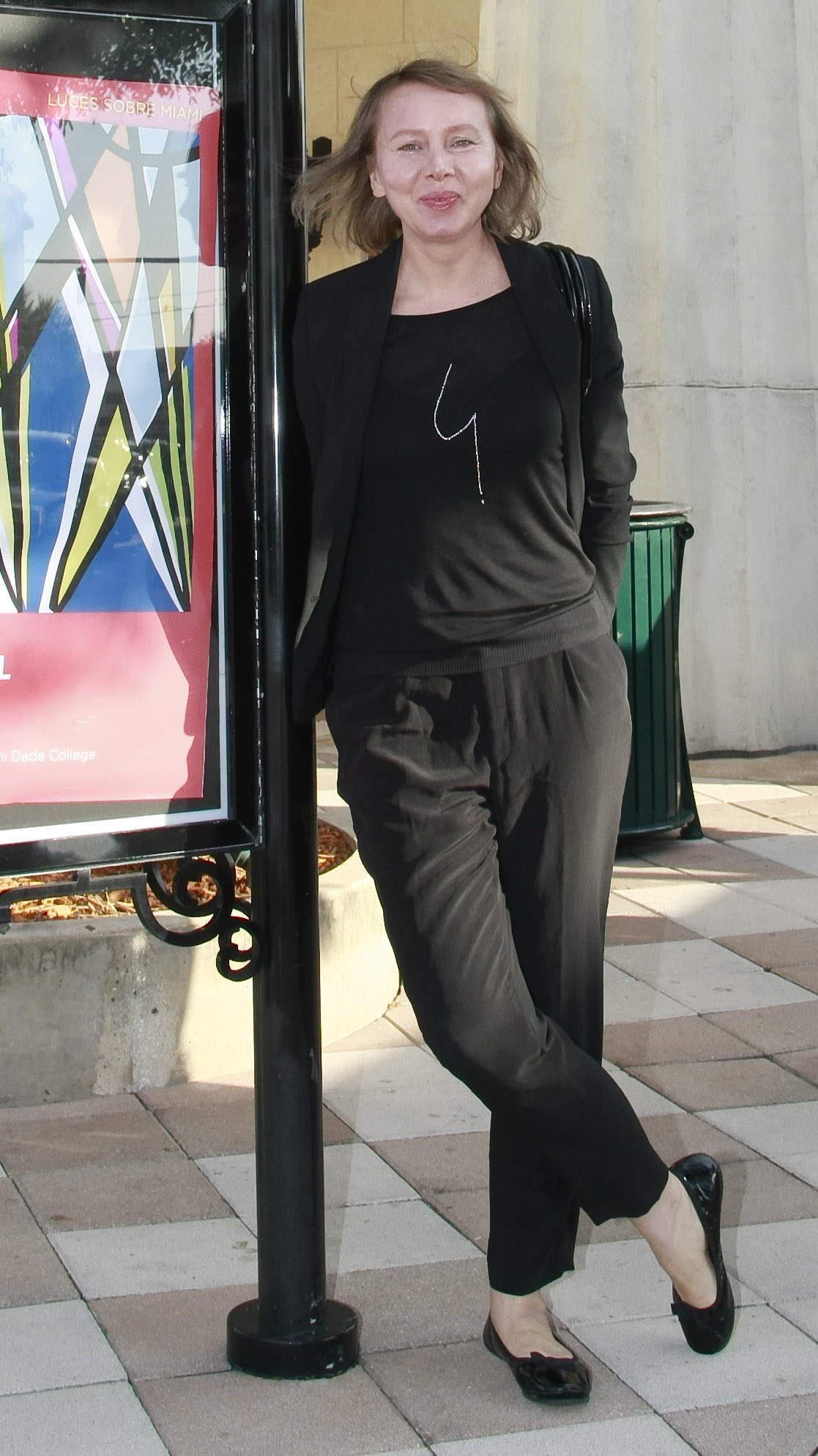
- Antoniak at the 2012 Miami International Film Festival
- Born: 1968 (age 57–58); Częstochowa, Kielce Voivodeship, Polish People's Republic
- Education: Krzysztof Kieślowski Film School and NFA
- Occupation: Film director

Urszula Antoniak (born 1968 in Częstochowa, Poland) is a Polish-Dutch film director. She is best known for her film Nothing Personal which won four Golden calves.

== Biography ==
Antoniak graduated from the Krzysztof Kieślowski Film School in Katowice and the Netherlands Film Academy in Amsterdam.

== Selected filmography ==
- 2009: Nothing Personal
- 2011: Code Blue
- 2014: Nude Area
- 2017: Beyond Words
- 2020: Magic Mountains
