= Mia Van Roy =

Flemish actress

Mia Van Roy (born October 15, 1944 in Turnhout, Belgium) is a Flemish film and television actress.

Her husband is journalist Piet Piryns and her daughter is the Groen Senator, Freya Piryns.

== Roles ==
She starred in Dutch movies made for television and once doubled for the Flemish actress, Willeke van Ammelrooy in the Belgian remake of Fons Rademakers’ "Mira". She also starred in an episode of the 2011 French soap opera, Louis la Brocante.
