= The Two White Horses of Genghis Khan =

Mongolian epic in alliterative verse

The Two White Horses of Genghis Khan (Mongolian: Činggis-un qoyar ere jaγal-un tuγuji) is a Mongolian epic in alliterative verse, with a number of different versions. It is one of the oldest Mongolian literary works and supposedly hails from the 13th/14th century.

== Summary ==
The epic deals with two white horses owned by Genghis Khan. The younger one feels their services for the ruler are not being appreciated enough, and tries to convince the older one to move away together. The older one is reluctant, but after the younger one runs away on his own, the older one follows.

The younger horse enjoys his new freedom, but the older one is homesick for their master, their mother and their comrades. He gets thinner and thinner, and in the end the younger one agrees to return home. Meanwhile, Genghis Khan has been missing his two white horses too, and after their return they are duly praised when they perform services for the khan. In the end, strips of silk are bound into their manes - a custom still observed today, for example with horses that have won several naadam races.

== Publications ==
The epic has been published in Niislel Khüree (now Ulaanbaatar) in 1922, and again as part of Če. Damdinsürüngs Mongghol uran joqiyal-un degeji jaγun bilig in 1959. It has been translated into Russian and German, and - from a different version - into French.

== Movie ==
Two Horses of Genghis Khan is a movie directed by Mongolian filmmaker Byambasuren Davaa, who lives in Germany. It is about the singer Urna's quest to find the origins of the song. The German DVD, "Das Lied Von Den Zwei Pferden", only includes subtitles in German and Russian, not in any other language. A version with english subtitles was released for the North American market in 2009, under the title The Two Horses of Genghis Khan; this version is available on Blu-ray, DVD, and multiple streaming services.
