= Damdin =

Damdin (Mongolian: Дамди, Damdiny in the genitive form for patronymics) is a common part of Mongolian names, as in:

== Patronymic ==
- Damdin Sükhbaatar (1893–1923), founding father of Mongolian independence
- Damdiny Demberel (born 1941), speaker of the Mongolian parliament since 2008
- Damdinsüren Altangerel, a Mongolian linguist and author (1945–1998)
- Damdiny Süldbayar (born 1981), Mongolian olympic judoka
- Damdinsürengiin Nyamkhüü (born 1979), Mongolian judoka
- Damdin Tsogtbaatar (born 1970)

== Proper name ==
- Dam Din, the underground-travelling Khmer legendary hero
- Manlaibaatar Damdinsüren (1871–1921), Mongolian general and politician in the 1911–1920 period
- Jamtsangiin Damdinsüren (1898–1938), head of state of Mongolia from 1927 to 1929
- Tsendiin Damdin (1957–2018), retired Mongolian olympic judoka
