= Phra Ruang (disambiguation) =

Phra Ruang is a Thai legendary figure. The name may also refer to:

- HTMS Phra Ruang, a Siamese naval ship
- Phra Ruang Dynasty, the ruling family of the Sukhothai Kingdom
- Phra Ruang dam or Saritphong Dam, a historic dam in Sukhothai
