= Damdinsüren =

Damdinsüren may refer to one of the following people:

- Jamtsangiin Damdinsüren, a Mongolian politician (1898-1938)
- Tsendiin Damdinsüren, a Mongolian writer and linguist (1908 - 1986)
- Bilegiin Damdinsüren, a Mongolian composer (1919 - 1991)
- Manlaibaatar Damdinsüren, a Mongolian general and politician in the 1911-1920 period
- Damdinsüren Altangerel, a Mongolian teacher and writer (1945 - 1998)
