= Jaan Anvelt =

Estonian communist (1884–1937)

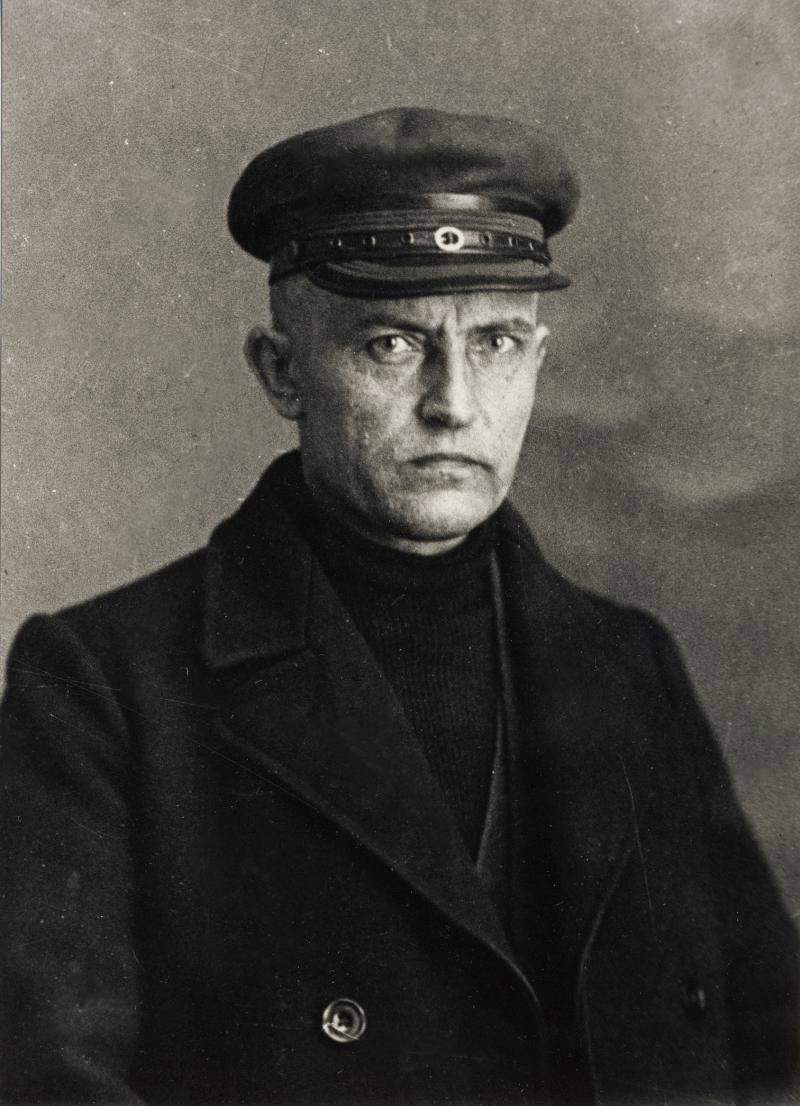
- Anvelt in 1925

Chairman of the Commune of the Working People of Estonia
- In office November 29, 1918 – June 5, 1919
- Preceded by: position established
- Succeeded by: position abolished

Personal details
- Born: April 18, 1884 Oorgu, Russian Empire
- Died: December 11, 1937 (aged 53) Moscow, Soviet Union
- Party: Communist Party of Estonia (1920–); All-Union Communist Party (Bolsheviks) (1912–); Russian Social Democratic Labour Party (–1912)
- Spouse(s): Alise Stein-Anvelt; J. Vassiljeva; Alma Ostra (1909–1910)
- Relatives: Andres Anvelt (grandson)
- Education: Saint Petersburg State University
- Military Service
- Allegiance: Russian SFSR
- Branch: Red Army
- Conflicts: Russian Civil War; Estonian War of Independence

Jaan Anvelt (also known by the pseudonyms Eessaare Aadu, Jaan Holm, Jaan Hulmu, Kaarel Maatamees, Onkel Kaak; in Russian Ян Анвельт or Н. Альтъ; 18 April 1884 – 11 December 1937), was an Estonian Bolshevik revolutionary and writer. He served the Russian SFSR, was a leader of the Communist Party of Estonia, the first premier of the Soviet Executive Committee of Estonia, and the chairman of the Council of the Commune of the Working People of Estonia (Estonian: Eesti Töörahva Kommuun). Imprisoned during Joseph Stalin's Great Purge in 1937, he died from the injuries sustained during a beating by Aleksandr Langfang while in NKVD custody.

== Early life ==
Anvelt was born to a peasant family in Oorgu, Võisiku Parish (now Viljandi Parish), Kreis Fellin, Governorate of Livonia. He studied to become a schoolteacher, beginning in Dorpat (now Tartu), and then in St. Petersburg, where he joined the Russian Social Democratic Labour Party's Bolshevik faction. He was employed as a schoolteacher from 1905 to 1907, concurrently being involved in revolutionary activity. From 1907 to 1912, Anvelt studied part-time as a student of jurisprudence at St. Petersburg University.

== October Revolution ==
On November 5, 1917 (by the current Gregorian calendar – October 23 by the Julian calendar still in use in Russia at the time), Bolshevik leader Jaan Anvelt led his leftist revolutionaries to the revolution in Tallinn, the capital of Estonia, and took political power.

== Post-Revolution ==
After the defeat of the revolutionaries in the Baltics, Anvelt went underground, remaining active as a revolutionary, emerging as one of the leaders of the 1924 Estonian coup d'état attempt. In 1925, Anvelt arrived in the USSR, in 1926–29 working as a political commissar of the Zhukovsky Air Force Engineering Academy. From 1929 to 1935 he worked in top positions of the civilian air fleet's main administration. During the period from 1935 to 1937 Anvelt served as a member and an executive secretary of a department within the Comintern.

Anvelt was arrested in 1937. Interrogated in custody, he died from the injuries inflicted by the interrogator Aleksandr Langfang on 11 December 1937, and was denounced as an enemy of the people afterwards.

In 1956, during the thaw of Nikita Khrushchev, Anvelt was rehabilitated. In 1957, Aleksandr Langfang was arrested for human rights abuses. In 1958, he was sentenced to 15 years in prison for torture and falsifying evidence. Langfang served his entire sentence, and was released from prison in 1973.

== Personal life ==
Jaan Anvelt was married to Social Democratic politician Alma Ostra from 1909 to 1910. In 1912 he had married a Russian woman, J. Vassiljeva in St. Petersburg. His third wife was Alise Stein-Anvelt, with whom he had two children, a daughter Kima and son Jaan.

His grandson Andres Anvelt became the Estonian Interior Minister for the Social Democratic Party in 2016.

== Bibliography ==
- Räästaalused (Eessaare Aadu. – Tallinn : Mõte, 1916)
- Alasti (Eessaare Aadu. – Tallinn : Mõte, 1917)
- Kes on sotsialdemokraadid-enamlased? (K. Maatamees. - [Tallinn] : VSDTP Eestimaa Komitee, 1917)
- Kes on sotsialdemokraadid-enamlased? (K. Maatamees. - 2. ed. - Tallinn : VSDTP Eestimaa Komitee, 1917)
- Maa rahwa kätte (K. Maatamees. – Tallinn : Mõte, 1917)
- Maa rahwa kätte (K. Maatamees. – 2. ed. – Tallinn : Mõte, 1917)
- Metsa serwal (Eessaare Aadu. – Petrograd : 1919)
- Töörahwa wõimuwalitsuse kindlustamisest (Jaan Anwelt. – Peterburis : Kom.partei Eesti Keskk. Wenemaa büroo, 1919 – Töörahva kirjandus; nr. 15)
- Maha kommunistid! Elagu sotsiaaldemokraadid! : töörahwa sõpradest ja waenlastest. - Tallinn : J. Linzmann, 1924. – Töörahva raamatukogu; nr. 1
- 1905. aasta Eestis : Kirjeldused. Mälestused. Dokumendid (EKP KK ajalookomisjon; [foreword: H. Pöögelmann]. – Leningrad : Külvaja, 1926)
- Sotsialistlise ühiskonna ehitamine Nõukogude Liidus : (Ü.K.(e)P. konwerentsi puhul) (J. Anwelt ja O. Rästas. – Moskwas : Nõukogude Sotsialistliste Vabariikide Liidu Rahvaste Keskkirjastus, 1927)
- "Meie lahkuminekud", ehk, EKP "wastasrinna" ajaloolised unenäod (J. Anwelt. – Leeningraad : Külvaja, 1928)
- Lenini partei ja trotskistid (Jaan Anwelt. – Leningrad : Külvaja, 1929)
- Parempoolne kallak Üleliidulises Kommunistlises (enamlaste) Parteis (J. Anwelt. – Leningrad : Külvaja, 1929)
- Jutustusi (Eessaare Aadu; [compiled by E. Sõgel; illustrated by A. Kütt; epilogue: E. Päll]. – Tallinn : Eesti Riiklik Kirjastus, 1957)
- Oktoobrirevolutsioon Eestis (Jaan Anvelt. – Tallinn : Eesti Raamat, 1967)
- Valitud jutustusi (Eessaare Aadu. – Tallinn : Eesti Raamat, 1971)
- Valitud teosed. 1. [volume.], 1905 - 1917 (Jaan Anvelt; EKP Keskkomitee Partei Ajaloo Instituut, NLKP Marksismi-Leninismi Instituudi Filiaal; [compiled by Karl Tammistu]. – Tallinn : Eesti Raamat, 1982)
- Valitud teosed. 2., 1917–1921 (Jaan Anvelt; EKP Keskkomitee Partei Ajaloo Instituut, NLKP Marksismi-Leninismi Instituudi Filiaal; [toimetuse kolleegium: Karl Tammistu (compiler).. etc.]. - Tallinn : Eesti Raamat, 1983)
- Linnupriid (Eessaare Aadu. – Tallinn : Eesti Raamat, 1984)
- Valitud teosed. 3., 1921 – 1925 (Jaan Anvelt; [compiled by K. Tammistu]; EKP Keskkomitee Partei Ajaloo Instituut, NLKP Marksismi-Leninismi Instituudi Filiaal. - Tallinn : Eesti Raamat, 1986)
- Valitud teosed. 4. [volume.] 1925-1928 (Jaan Anvelt; EKP Keskkomitee Partei Ajaloo Instituut, NLKP Marksismi-Leninismi Instituudi Filiaal; [compiled by K. Tammistu]. - Tallinn : Eesti Raamat, 1987)

=== Books about Jaan Anvelt ===
- Fred Peterson, Jaan Anwelt : terroristide juht. nr. 1 (Tartu : Argus, 1925)
- Richard Majak, Jaan Anvelt : [elu ja tegevus] : abiks lektorile (Tallinn : Eesti NSV ühing "Teadus", 1964. - Eesti NSV ühing "Teadus"; 1964, nr. 28)
- Mälestusi ja dokumente J. Anveldist (EKP Keskkomitee Partei Ajaloo Instituut – NLKP Keskkomitee Marksismi-Leninismi Instituudi filiaal; [compilator R. Majak]. – Tallinn : Eesti Raamat, 1965)
- Holger Pukk, Kirjad Liisale ([illustrated by Illimar Paul]. – Tallinn : Eesti Raamat, 1983)
- Alise Stein-Anvelt, Valguses ja varjus : unustamatuid inimesi ja sündmusi : [mälestusi V. Kingissepast ja J. Anveldist] (Tallinn : Eesti Raamat, 1988. - ISBN 5-450-00015-4)

== See also ==
- Viktor Kingissepp
- Jaan Tomp
- List of Estonian rulers
- October Revolution
