= Langfang (disambiguation) =

Langfang may refer to:

- Langfang, a prefecture-level city in Hebei Province, China
- Aleksandr Langfang, a Soviet lieutenant-general

== See also ==
- Lanfang (disambiguation)
