= Jaak Nanilson =

Estonian politician

Jaak Nanilson (1880 – 16 August 1924 near Abja, Viljandi County) was an Estonian politician. He was a member of II Riigikogu. He was a member of the Riigikogu since 22 March 1924. He replaced Alice Leevald. On 19 August 1924, he resigned his position and he was replaced by Boris Kumm. He was assassinated by communist activists in 1924.
