= Khorloogiin Choibalsan =

Leader of Mongolia from 1939 to 1952

- ᠬᠣᠷᠯᠤ᠎ᠠ ᠶᠢᠨ ᠴᠤᠢᠪᠠᠯᠰᠠᠩ; Хорлоогийн Чойбалсан
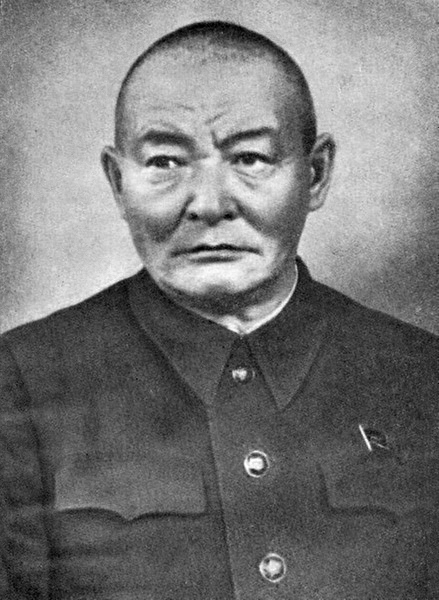
- Choibalsan in the 1940s

10th Chairman of the Council of Ministers
- In office 24 March 1939 – 26 January 1952
- General Secretary: Banzarjavyn Baasanjav; Dashiin Damba; Yumjaagiin Tsedenbal
- Preceded by: Anandyn Amar
- Succeeded by: Yumjaagiin Tsedenbal

4th Chairman of the Presidium of the State Little Khural
- In office 24 January 1929 – 27 April 1930
- General Secretary: Ölziin Badrakh; Bat-Ochiryn Eldev-Ochir; Peljidiin Genden
- Preceded by: Jamtsangiin Damdinsüren
- Succeeded by: Losolyn Laagan

Personal details
- Born: Khorloogiin Dugar; 8 February 1895 Achit Beysiyn, Outer Mongolia, China (present-day Mongolia)
- Died: 26 January 1952 (aged 56) Moscow, Soviet Union
- Resting place: Altan-Ölgii National Cemetery
- Party: Mongolian People's Revolutionary Party
- Spouse(s): Borotologai (1921–1935); B. Gündegmaa (1935–1952)

Military service
- Allegiance: Mongolian People's Republic
- Branch/service: Mongolian People's Army
- Years of service: 1921–1952
- Rank: Marshal
- Commands: All (supreme commander)
- Battles/wars: Mongolian Revolution of 1921; Soviet–Japanese border conflicts; World War II
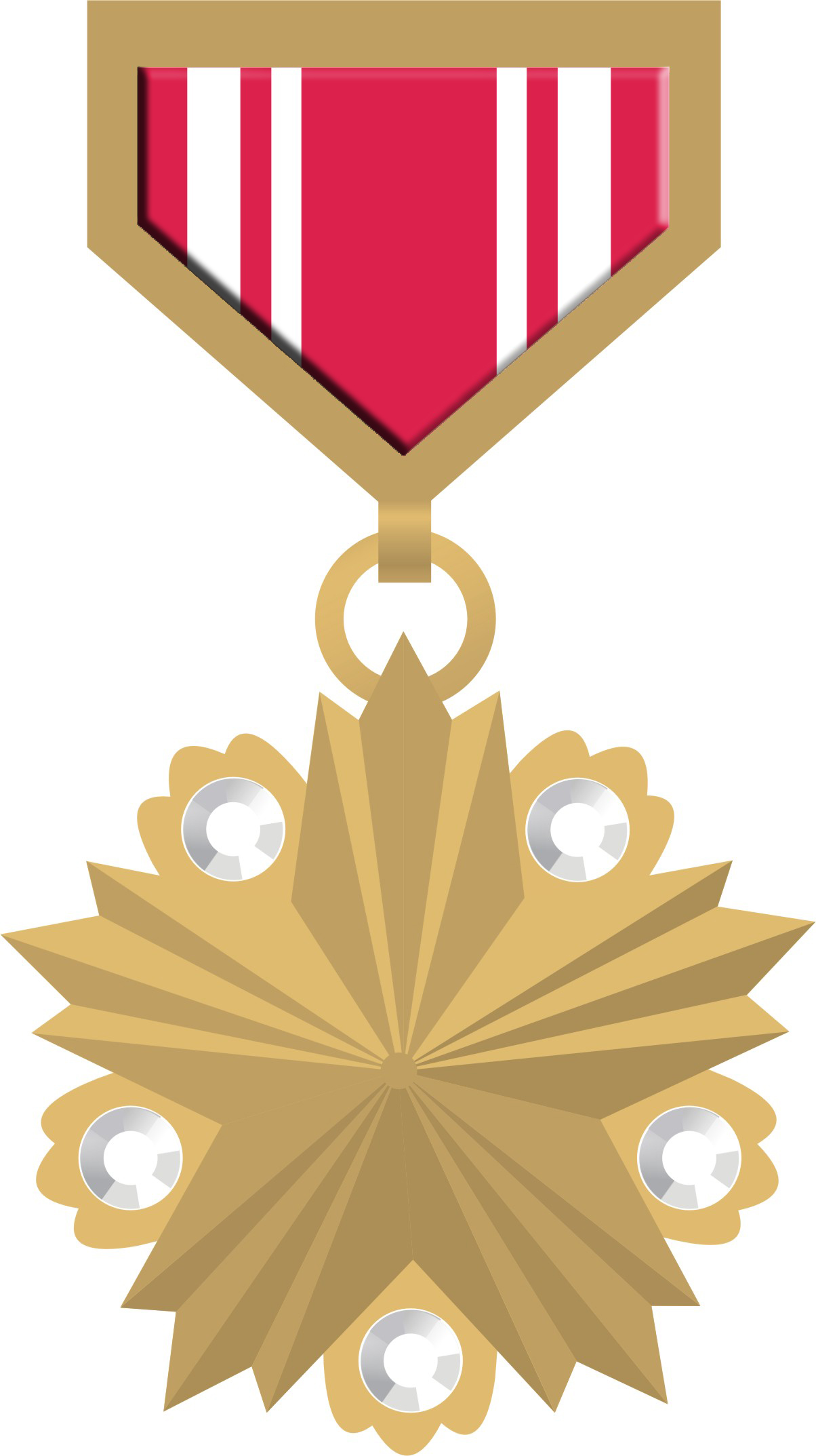
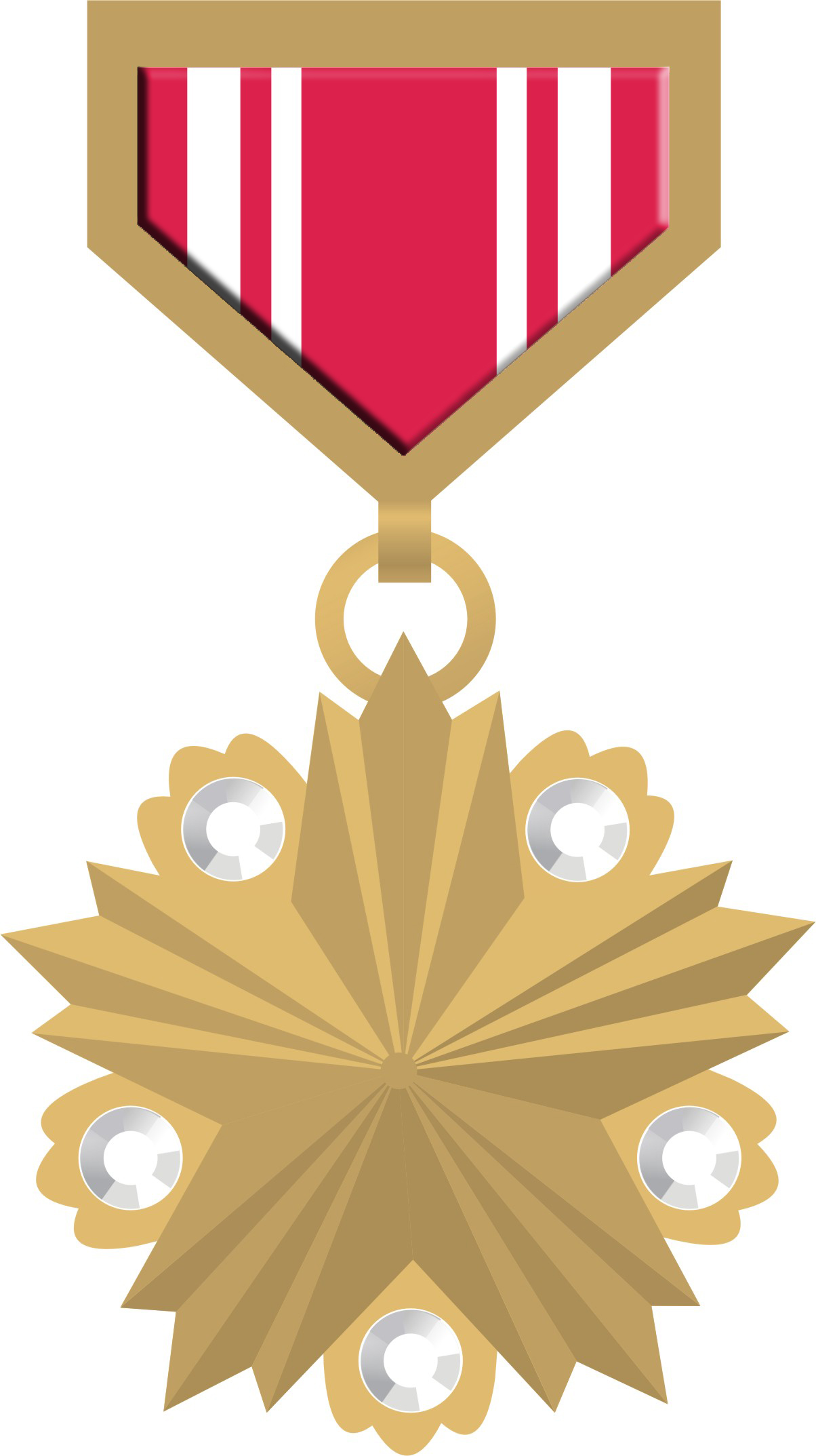
- Awards: Foreign:
- De facto leader of the MPR: ← (First in role); Tsedenbal →

Khorloogiin Choibalsan (Note: In this Mongolian name, the given name is Choibalsan. Khorloogiin is a matronymic, not a family name. Therefore, he should be referred to by his given name, Choibalsan.) (Note: /xɔːrˌloʊɡ ˈtʃɔɪbəlsən/ khor-LOHG CHOI-bəl-sən; Mongolian: Хорлоогийн Чойбалсан, pronounced [χɔrˈɮɔːciˑɴ ˈt͡ɕʰɞe̯pɬ̩sɴ̩]) (8 February 1895 – 26 January 1952) was a Mongolian revolutionary and politician who served as the leader of the Mongolian People's Republic as the chairman of the Council of Ministers (premier) from 1939 until his death in 1952. He was also the commander-in-chief of the Mongolian People's Army from 1937, and the chairman of the Presidium of the State Little Khural (head of state) from 1929 to 1930. His rule was maintained by a repressive state and cult of personality. Choibalsan led a dictatorship and organized Stalinist purges in Mongolia between 1937 and 1939 as head of the Ministry of Internal Affairs.

Choibalsan was one of the 1921 Mongolian revolutionaries and held several political and military roles in the 1920s. Mongolia's economic, political, and military ties to the Soviet Union deepened, though after World War II, Choibalsan supported pan-Mongolian unification with Inner Mongolia. He died of cancer in Moscow in 1952 and was succeeded as leader by his protégé, Yumjaagiin Tsedenbal.

== Early life ==
Choibalsan was born on 8 February 1895 in Achit Beysiyn, near present-day Choibalsan, Dornod Province. He was the youngest of four children born to a poor, unmarried herdswoman named Khorloo (the name Khorloogiin is a matronymic). His father was likely a Barga tribesman, Daur Mongol from Inner Mongolia called Jamsu, but Choibalsan claimed to be unaware of his identity.

Named Dugar at birth, he assumed the religious name Choibalsan at age 13 after entering the local Buddhist monastery of San Beysiyn Khüree, where he trained to be a Lamaist monk. Five years later he and another novice fled to Khüree (also known as Urga—present-day Ulaanbaatar), where he worked odd jobs. In part to prevent him from being returned to the monastery, a sympathetic Buryat teacher named Nikolai Danchinov had him enrolled in the Russian consulate's Russian-Mongolian Translators' School. A year later he was sent on, at public expense, to study at a gymnasium in Irkutsk, Russia from 1914 to 1917.

== Mongolian Revolution of 1921 ==
=== Formation of the Mongolian People's Party ===
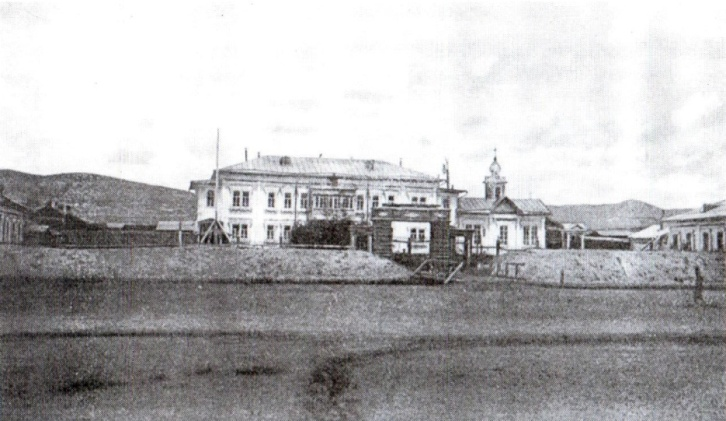
The Russian Consulate in Khüree played a central role in Choibalsan's early development.

Choibalsan and fellow Mongolian students in Russia were called back to Khüree by the Bogd Khaan government following the 1917 October Revolution. Exposed to Bolshevism while living among Irkutsk's radicalized student population, Choibalsan joined the revolutionary Consular Hill or Konsulyn Denj (Консулын дэнж) group, heavily influenced by Bolshevist philosophy and established to resist the Chinese occupation of Outer Mongolia after 1919. Original members of the group also included Dambyn Chagdarjav and Darizavyn Losol.

Dogsomyn Bodoo, the group's leader, was a former teacher and mentor of Choibalsan's at the Russian-Mongolian School for Translators. With his serviceable Russian, Choibalsan served as the group's translator with contacts at the Russian Consulate. Those contacts later encouraged Konsulyn Denj to join forces with the more nationalist-oriented resistance group Züün Khüree (East Khüree), which counted Soliin Danzan, Dansrabilegiin Dogsom, and Damdin Sükhbaatar among its members. On 25 June 1920, the new body adopted the name Mongolian People's Party (MPP). In 1924 the party renamed itself the Mongolian People's Revolutionary Party, or MPRP, after the death of the Bogd Khaan and the formal proclamation of the Mongolian People's Republic (MPR).

=== Contact with Soviets and the first MPP Congress ===
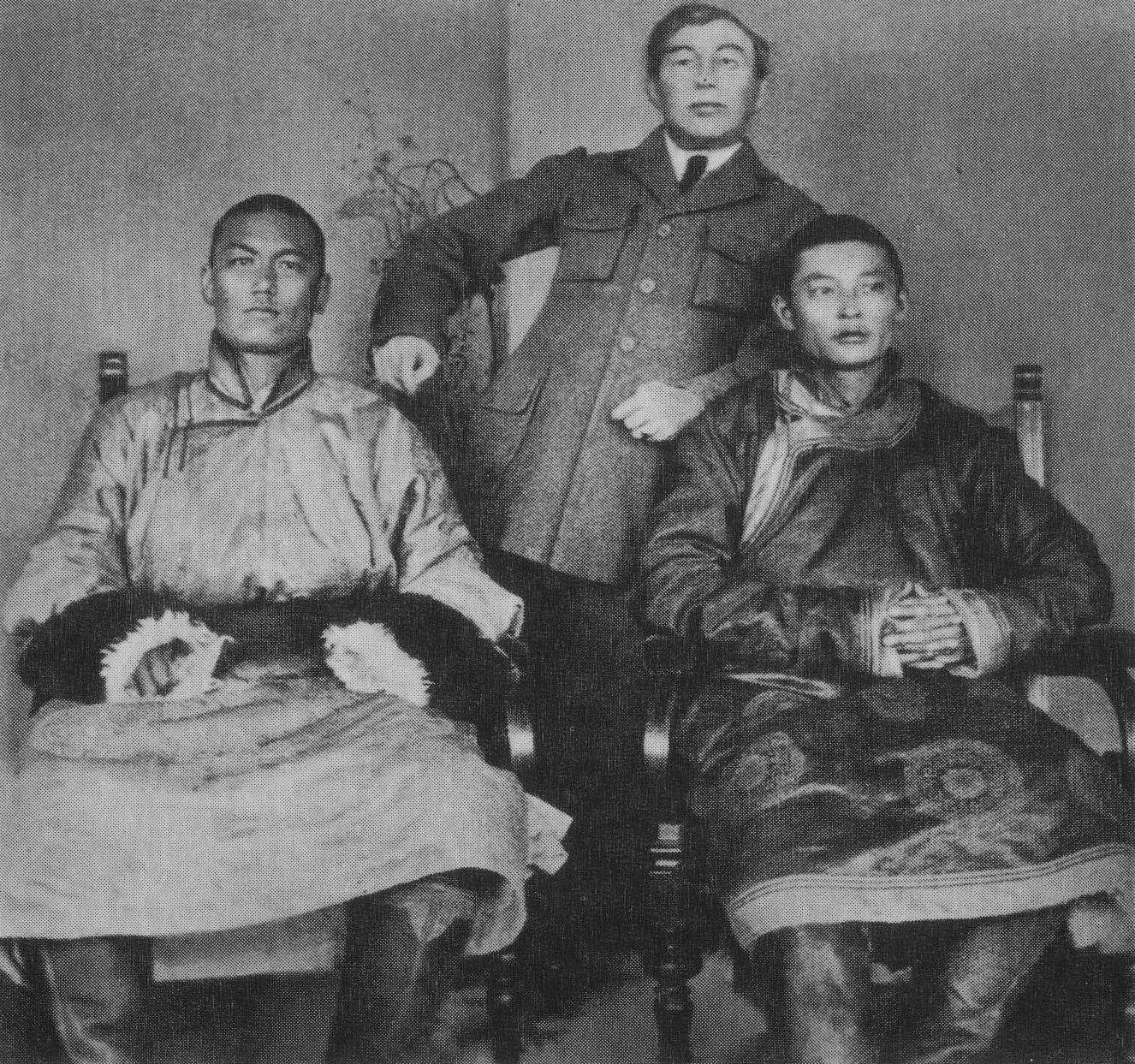
Choibalsan (right) with Damdin Sükhbaatar (left) and Vladimir Khuva (center) in the early 1920s

In late June 1920, Choibalsan and Danzan embarked for Irkutsk (they were later joined by Losol, Chagdarjav, Dogsom, L. Dendev, and Sükhbaatar—the infamous "First Seven") to establish contacts with the Soviets and seek assistance in their struggle for independence. Choibalsan and Sükhbaatar remained together in Irkutsk for several months raising awareness of Mongolia's plight and receiving military training. During this period Sükhbaatar gradually became a second mentor to Choibalsan.

While the group of seven continued their lobbying efforts in Soviet Russia, forces commanded by the anti-Bolshevik Russian warlord Roman von Ungern-Sternberg invaded Mongolia from the east and ejected occupying Chinese garrisons from Khüree in February 1921. No longer faced with directly confronting the Chinese in Mongolia, the Soviets finally threw their backing behind the Mongolian revolutionaries. Choibalsan and Sükhbaatar relocated to Troitskosavsk (modern-day Kyakhta on the Russian-Mongolian border) to coordinate revolutionary activities and recruit Mongolian fighters. Choibalsan secretly ventured as far as Khüree to consult with MPP supporters, enlist fighters, and spirit members of Sükhbaatar's family back to Troitskosavsk.

At a Soviet-organized MPP conference held secretly in Troitskosavsk from 1 to 3 March 1921 (subsequently regarded as the first congress of the Mongolian People's Revolutionary Party), Choibalsan was elected a member of the provisional revolutionary government. He was also appointed Political Commissar (Deputy Chief and chief propagandist) of the Mongol Ardyn Huv'sgalt Tsereg (Mongolian: Монгол Ардын Хувьсгалт Цэрэг), or the Mongolian People's Army, commanded by Sükhbaatar.

=== Defeat of Ungern-Sternberg ===
Within days, Sükhbaatar's Mongolian partisan army (now numbering 400 men) defeated the larger but demoralized Chinese garrison that had fled to Kyakhta Maimaicheng (modern-day Altanbulag). Joint Mongol and Red Army forces directly confronted Ungern's troops in a series of battles near Troitskosavsk from late May to mid-June. Choibalsan took command of a Mongolian detachment based in Tariat, in modern-day Arkhangai province and, together with the Russian forces commanded by Petr Efimovich Shchetinkin, fought right guard actions in western Mongolia in support of the main Russian-Mongolian advance through modern-day Selenge and Töv provinces.

After small skirmishes with Ungern's remaining guard units, the joint Russian-Mongol force entered Khüree unchallenged on 6 July 1921. Choibalsan pursued remnants of Ungern's army and was likely on hand at Ungern's capture by Shchetinkin on 22 August 1921.

== Rise to power ==
After the revolution, Choibalsan remained Deputy Chief of the Mongolian People's Army, while also being elected Chairman of the Mongolian Revolutionary Youth League (MRYL). Despite his credentials as one of the MPP's founding members, he failed to advance beyond second-tier government posts throughout the 1920s. His heavy drinking, womanizing, and violent temperament alienated him from party leaders and at one point in the early 1930s he was temporarily demoted from being Minister of Foreign Affairs to the role of simple Museum Director.

While he often gravitated towards the leftist faction of the party, he was suspected of being a rightist in what little mention is made of him in Soviet and Mongolian reports of the era. Choibalsan himself did not include many of his own speeches from this period in his collected works, indicating his role during this period was not a prominent one. It was not until members of the Soviet security apparatus such as Soviet Commissar for Defense Kliment Voroshilov took note of Choibalsan's political usefulness in the late 1920s and early 1930s that his career prospects began to improve.

=== Purge of Bodoo ===
In late 1921, Choibalsan's MRYL foot soldiers carried out Prime Minister Bodoo's modernization campaign of forcibly cutting off "feudal" ornaments from Mongolian clothing (large cuffs, women's jewelry, long hair etc.). The angry public backlash led to Bodoo's purge and eventual execution in August 1922, while Choibalsan was stripped of both full party membership and his position as deputy commander of the Mongolian military. Only Sükhbaatar's intervention saved him from Bodoo's fate.

Choibalsan was sent to a Moscow Russian Military Academy after Sükhbaatar's death in 1923. When he returned to Ulaanbaatar a year later was offered his old mentor's former position as Commander in Chief of the People's Revolutionary Troops. He also held positions as a member of the Presidium of the State Great Khural from 1924 to 1928 and as a member of the MPRP Central Committee.

=== Right Opportunism (1925–28) ===
At the Third Party Congress in 1924, Choibalsan sided with the leftist leader Rinchingiin Elbegdorj as left and right-wing factions of the MPRP called for the arrest and execution of moderate party leader Danzan, who was accused of protecting bourgeois interests and engaging in business with Chinese firms. Following Danzan's death, Choibalsan and Rinchino's political influence diminished as the party's right-wing, led by Tseren-Ochiryn Dambadorj, assumed control.

=== Leftist Period 1928–1932 ===
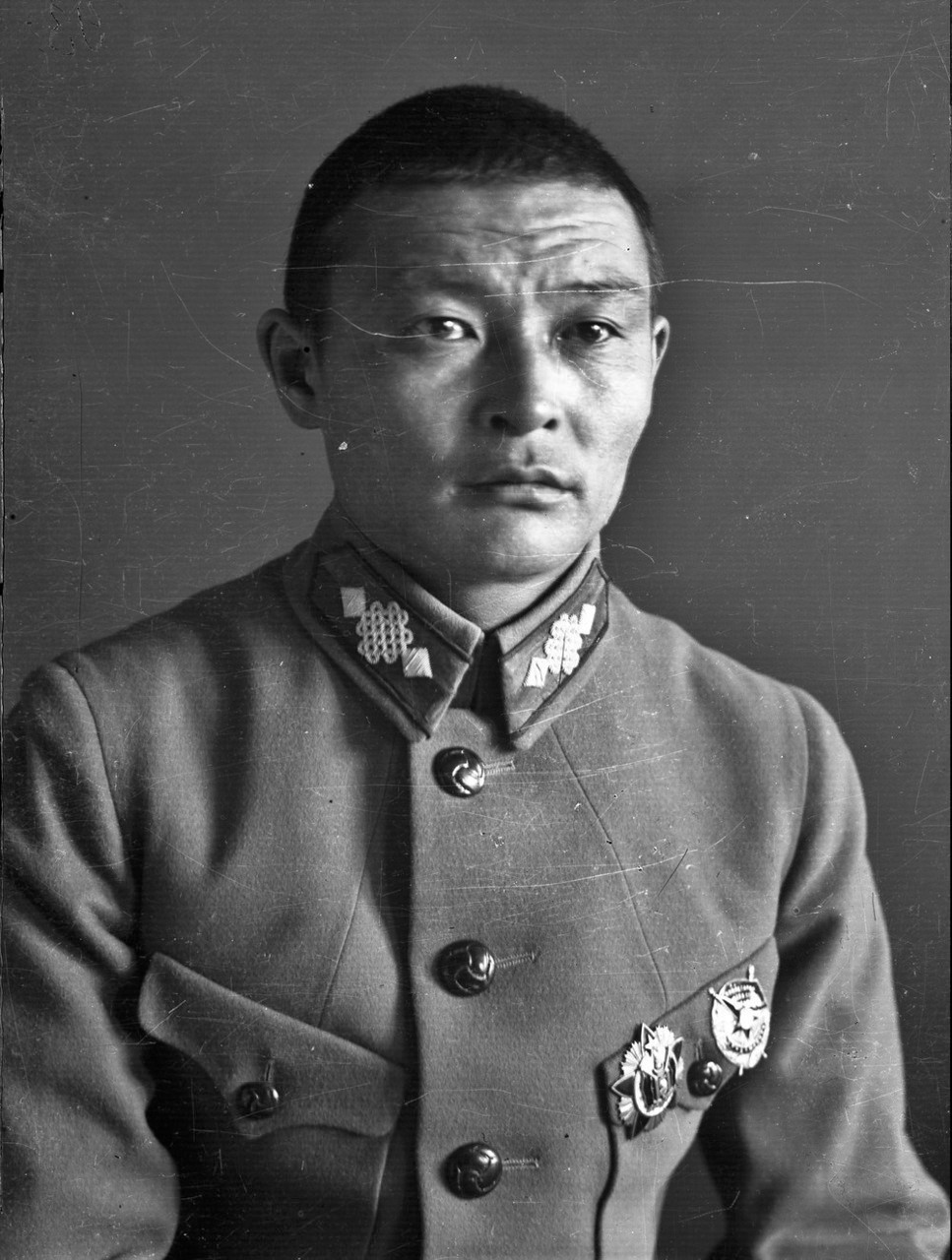
Choibalsan c. 1925

The rise of Josef Stalin and termination of Lenin's New Economic Policy influenced political developments in the MPR with the 1928 MPRP Seventh Party Congress ushering in the "Leftist Period." Soviet advisors arranged for Choibalsan to be "kicked upstairs" to be Chairman of the Little Hural (i.e. titular head of state) from where, in 1929 and 1930, he supported implementation of Soviet-backed leftist policies of more rapid collectivization, land expropriation, and persecution of the Buddhist faith.

At the Eighth Party Congress in 1930 Choibalsan contributed to a ramping up of leftist socialist reforms when, again encouraged by Soviet agents, he introduced personally formulated decrees that intensified land confiscation and forced collectivization measures. His appointment in 1931 as Minister of Livestock and Agriculture (a position he held until 1935) gave him even greater authority to enforce the policies. Traditional herders were forced off the steppe and into badly managed collective farms, destroying one third of Mongolian livestock. Over 800 properties belonging to the nobility and the Buddhist faith were confiscated and over 700 head of mostly noble households were executed. Under Stalinist influence in the Mongolian People's Republic, an estimated 17,000 monks were killed, official figures show.

The government's aggressive measures ultimately lead to brutal armed uprisings in Khövsgöl, Arkhangai, Övörkhangai, and Zavkhan provinces in 1932. In reaction, Moscow ordered a temporary curtailment of economic centralization efforts. Comintern agents counted on Choibalsan to be a strong advocate for its New Turn policy to correct the "excesses" of "the Left Deviation" when it was introduced in an extraordinary plenum of the MPRP Central Committee in June 1932. Later MPR histories would credit Choibalsan with being the first to criticize the leftist period and propose reforms, but these were mere fabrications meant to build up Choibalsan's cult of personality.

=== Lkhümbe Affair ===
See also: Lhümbe Case

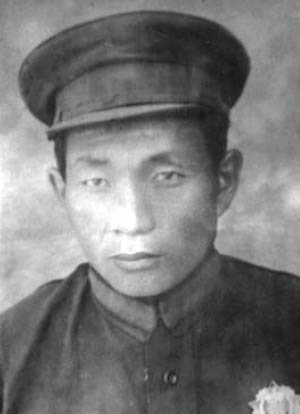
Jambyn Lkhümbe

The invasion of neighboring Manchuria by Japanese forces in 1931 had raised fears in Ulaanbaatar and Moscow alike of possible Japanese military expansion into Mongolia and the Soviet Far East. In the summer of 1934, Choibalsan's name surfaced during interrogations of party members arrested as part of the "Lkhümbe Affair," a manufactured conspiracy in which MPRP General Secretary Jambyn Lkhümbe and other MPRP elements, particularly Buryat-Mongols, were falsely accused of conspiring with Japanese spies. Over 1,500 people were implicated in the purge and 56 were executed.

Choibalsan was called to Moscow, where he was arrested and interrogated regarding his possible involvement. Within days, however, he was cooperating with the NKVD in the interrogation and torture of fellow Mongolians. Satisfied with his loyalty, Stalin ordered Mongolia's Prime Minister Peljidiin Genden to appoint Choibalsan as deputy prime minister.

Genden vigorously objected, but to no avail. As relations between Genden and Stalin soured, Choibalsan's influence with Moscow increased. In 1935, as a public sign of his favor, Stalin bestowed 20 GAZ automobiles on Choibalsan, who then distributed them among Mongolian power players to increase his prestige.

== Great Terror ==
=== Purge of Genden ===
In 1936 Choibalsan and Gelegdorjiin Demid were appointed Marshals of the Armed Forces while Choibalsan also became head of the newly elevated Ministry of Internal Affairs, 26 percent of whose staff were NKVD agents. Acting under Moscow's directive, Choibalsan then had Genden purged in March 1936 for sabotaging Mongol-Soviet relations by rejecting Stalin's demand that he eliminate the country's Buddhist clergy. Genden was removed from his offices of the prime minister and foreign minister, arrested, and sent to Moscow, where he was executed a year later. Anandyn Amar became Prime Minister in his place.

Over the next three years, Soviet mentors in the Ministry of Internal Affairs guided Choibalsan in planning and carrying out the "Great Terror". Possibly advised by a Soviet Official, Chopyak, Choibalsan had Internal Affairs Committee rules amended in May 1936 to facilitate the detention of high ranking politicians without first consulting political superiors.

Soon thereafter 23 high ranking lamas were arrested for participating in a "counter revolutionary centre". Following a yearlong trial, they were publicly executed in early October 1937. When Mongolia's Procurator General protested the lamas' prosecution, he too was arrested and then shot.

=== Death of Marshal Demid ===
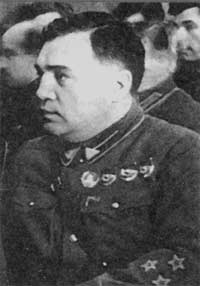
Deputy NKVD Chief Mikhail Frinovsky

In August 1937, the 36-year-old Marshal Demid, whose popularity Choibalsan had always resented, died under suspicious circumstances, resulting in Choibalsan's promotion to the dual role of sole Commander-in-Chief of the Mongolian military and Minister of Defense. The following day Choibalsan, as Interior Minister, issued Order 366 which declared that many in Mongolia "had fallen under the influence of Japanese spies and provocateurs."

That same month Stalin, alarmed by Japanese military movements in Manchuria ordered the stationing of 30,000 Red Army troops in Mongolia and dispatched a large Soviet delegation to Ulaanbaatar under Soviet Deputy NKVD Commissar Mikhail Frinovsky. Frinovsky was charged with setting in motion the violent purges that he had so effectively carried out in the Soviet Union under NKVD Chief Nikolai Yezhov. Working through Soviet advisers already embedded within the Ministry of Interior and with a willing Choibalsan providing symbolic cover, Frinovsky built the purge framework from behind the scenes, producing arrest lists and creating an NKVD style Troika (headed by Choibalsan) to try suspects.

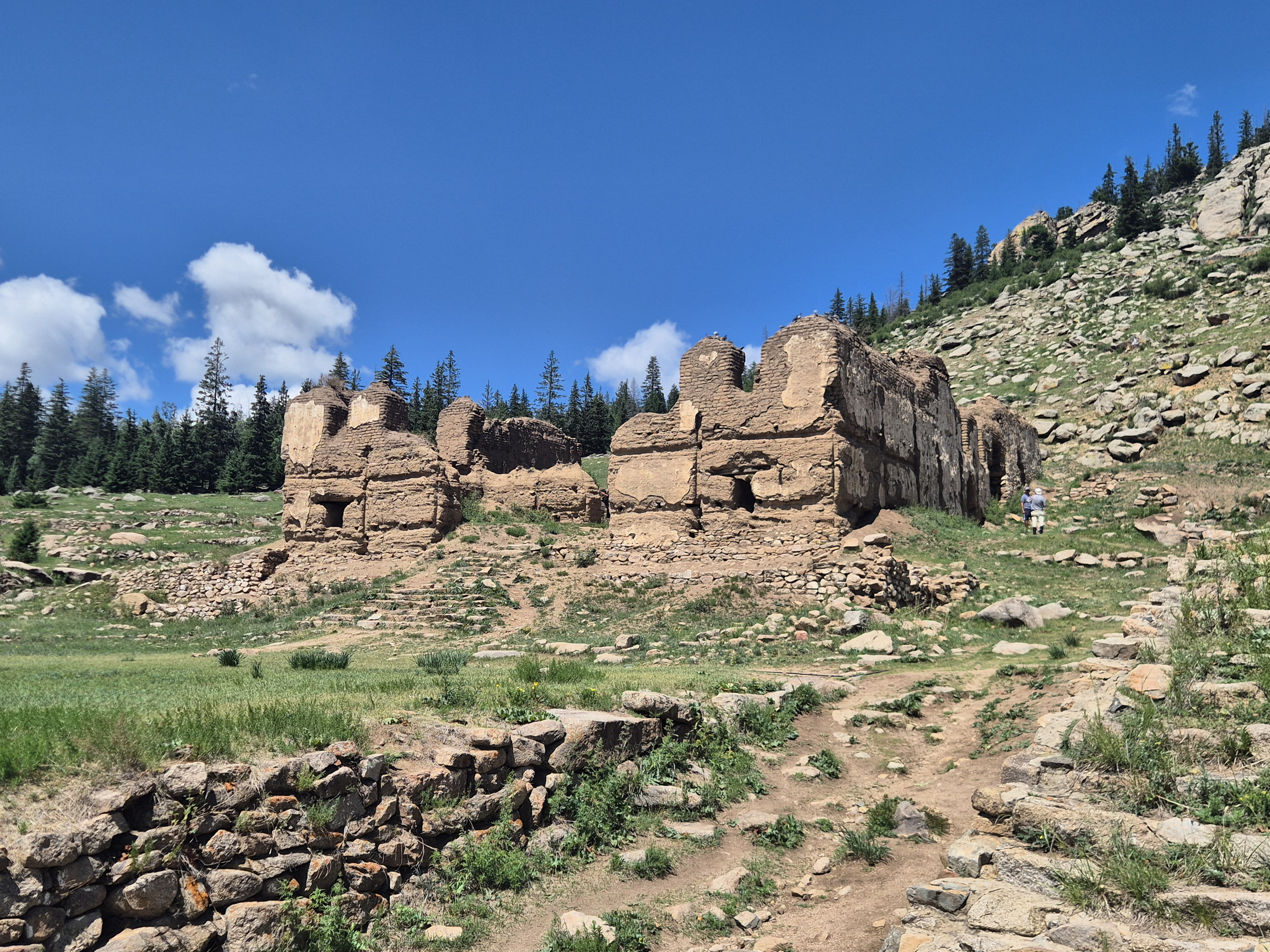
The ruins of Manzushir Khiid, one of several hundred Buddhist monasteries destroyed during the purge.

=== 10 September 1937 ===
The arrest of 65 high ranking government officials and intelligentsia on the night of 10 September 1937 signaled the launch of the purges in earnest. All were accused of spying for Japan as part of a Genden-Demid plot and most confessed under intense torture. The first show trial was staged at the Central Theatre from 18 to 20 October 1937. Thirteen of the 14 persons accused were sentenced to death.

In a spasm of violence that lasted nearly 18 months, Choibalsan's troika approved and carried out the execution of over 17,000 lamas accused of counterrevolutionary activities. Monks who were not executed were forcibly laicized while 746 of the country's monasteries were liquidated. Thousands more dissident intellectuals, political and government officials labelled "enemies of the revolution," as well as ethnic Buryats and Kazakhs, were also rounded up and killed. Twenty-five persons from top positions in the party and government, 187 from the military leadership, and 36 of the 51 members of the Central Committee were executed. Following the Russian model, Choibalsan opened gulags in the countryside to imprison dissidents.

While the NKVD effectively managed the purge by staging show trials and carrying out executions, a frequently intoxicated Choibalsan was sometimes present during torture and interrogations of suspected counterrevolutionaries, including old friends and comrades. Choibalsan rubber-stamped NKVD execution orders and at times personally directed executions. He also added names of political enemies to NKVD arrest lists simply to settle old scores.

=== End of the Great Terror ===
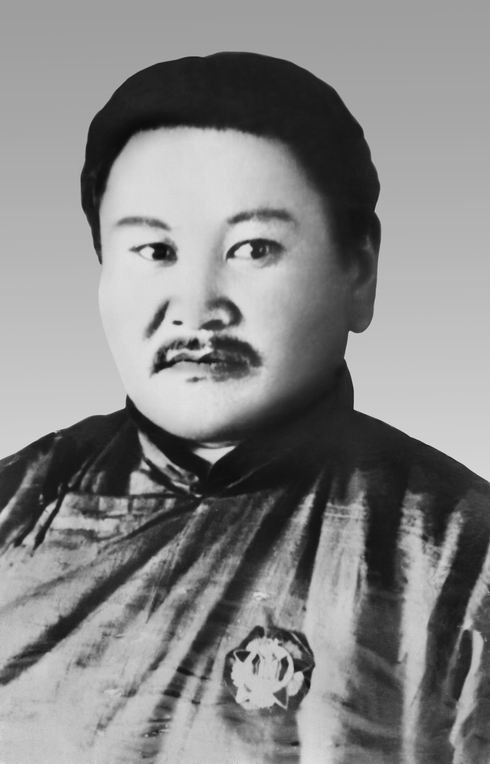
Genden

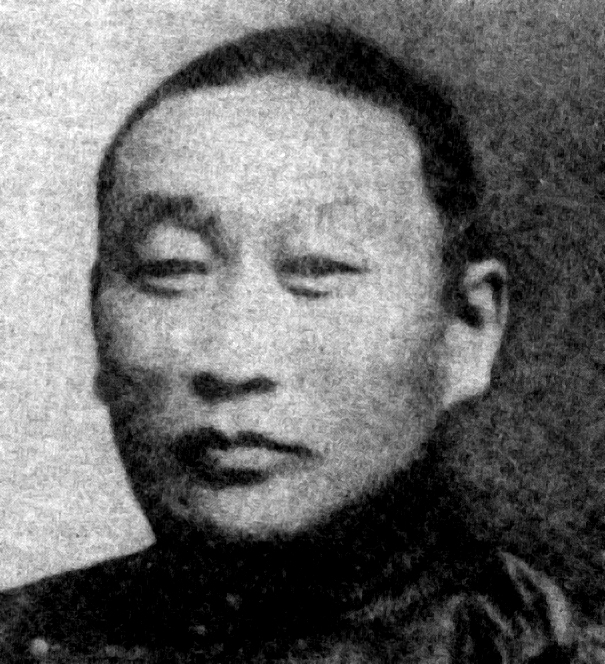
Amar

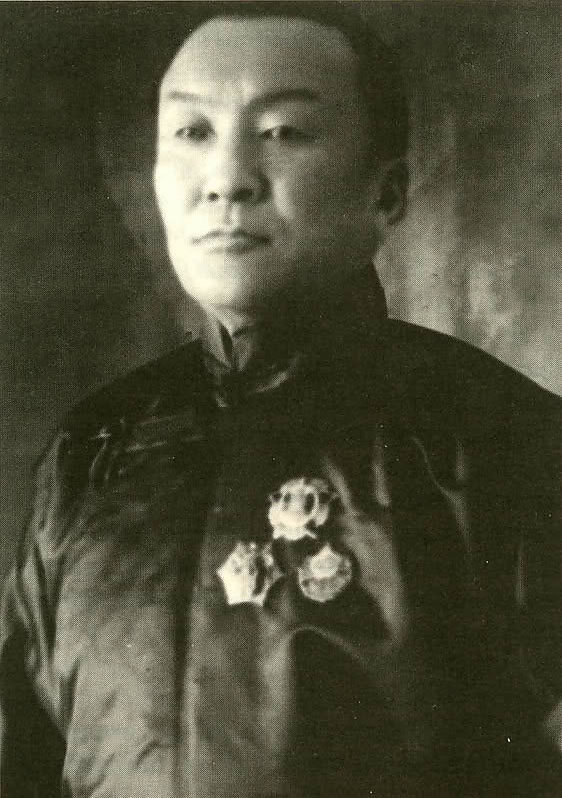
Dogsom

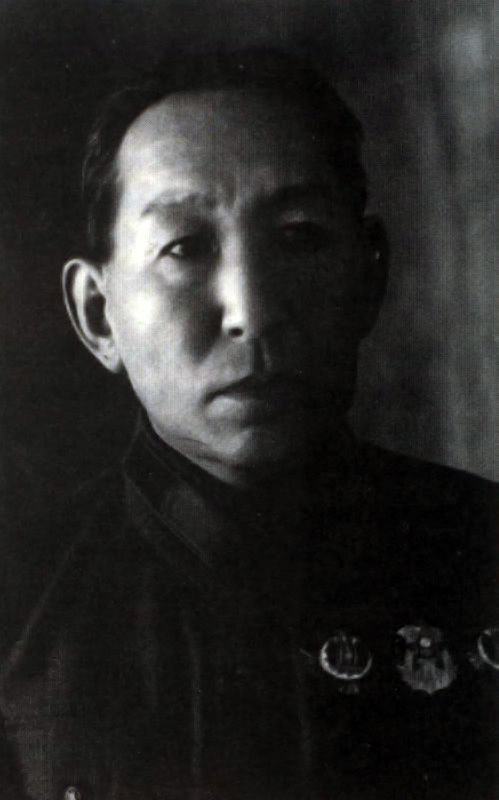
Losol

Notable victims of Choibalsan's purges include (from left); prime ministers P. Genden and A. Amar, and two of the founding members of the MPRP D. Dogsom and D. Losol

Racked with stress, Choibalsan spent six months (August 1938 – January 1939) recuperating and consulting with Voroshilov, Yezhov, and Stalin in Moscow and Sochi while NKVD agents and Interior Ministry officials carried on purge operations from Ulaanbaatar. When he returned to Mongolia, Choibalsan followed Soviet directives and had the highly popular Prime Minister Amar purged. Choibalsan claimed he "had helped anti-government plotters, opposed their arrest, and neglected the defense of the borders. He betrayed his own country and was a traitor to the revolution". After a coordinated propaganda campaign, Amar was arrested on 7 March 1939 and sent to the USSR, where he was later tried by a Soviet Troika and executed.

With Amar's removal, Choibalsan became Mongolia's uncontested leader, simultaneously holding the offices of Prime Minister, Minister for Internal Affairs, Minister of War, and Commander in Chief of the Mongolian armed forces. Secure in his position, Choibalsan brought the terror to an end in April 1939 by declaring that the excesses of the purges had been conducted by overzealous party officials while he was away in the USSR, but that he had overseen the arrests of the real criminals. Official blame for the purges fell on the deputy minister of internal affairs Nasantogtoh, and his former Soviet handler Kichikov. Later, other henchmen of the purge were arrested and executed, including Luvsansharav, Bayasgalan, Dashtseveg, and Luvsandorj.

Dogsom and Losol, the last two living members (besides Choibalsan himself) of the original seven founding members of the MPRP, were also arrested. Dogsom was executed in 1941. Losol died in a Soviet prison before his case came to trial.

== World War II (1939–45) ==
=== Battles of Khalkhin Gol ===
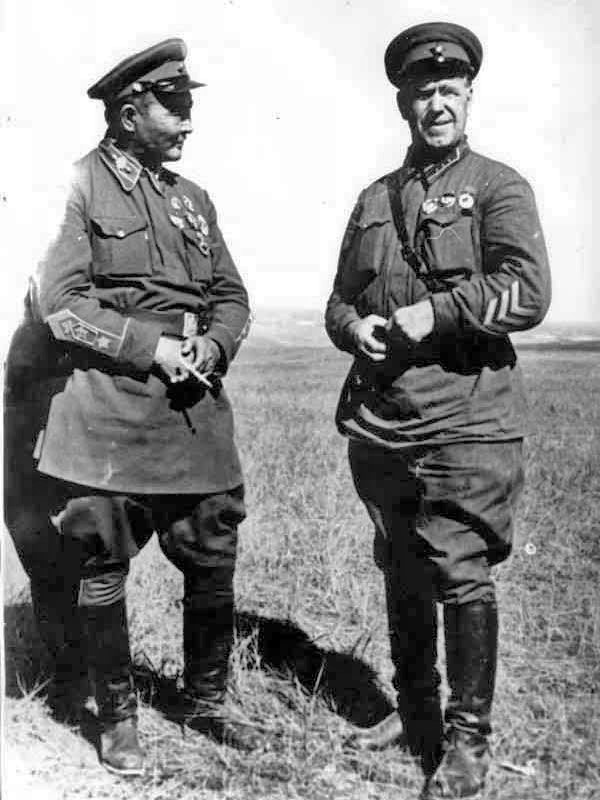
Georgy Zhukov and Khorloogiin Choibalsan (left) consult during the Battle of Khalkhin Gol

In the spring of 1939, Japanese Kwantung Army military leaders moved to test the resolve of the Soviet and Mongolian militaries to protect disputed territory along Mongolia's southeast border with Japanese occupied Manchuria. Over the course of three battles (May – September 1939) a heavily armoured Soviet military force commanded by Georgy Zhukov decisively defeated the Japanese advance near Nomonhan. There were nearly 8,000 casualties for both the Soviet and Japanese forces. Nevertheless, the victory, which took place close to his birthplace, helped cement Choibalsan's growing cult of personality which portrayed him as a staunch defender of Mongolian independence against imperialist Japanese aggression.

=== Support for the Soviet Union ===
Choibalsan proclaimed his country's unwavering support for the Soviet Union after Germany's invasion of the USSR in June 1941, although Mongolia never officially declared war against Germany and waited until August 1945 to declare war against Japan. As early as 1939, Stalin had pushed Choibalsan to increase Mongolia's livestock population to 200 million as a source of raw materials for the Soviet Union in the event of war in Europe. Throughout the conflict, the MPR's economy was re-calibrated to provide material support to the Soviet Union in the form of livestock, raw materials, money, food, military clothing, meat, sheepskin, felt boots, fur-lined coats, and funding for several Soviet military units. Choibalsan and the newly elected Secretary General of the MPRP Yumjaagiin Tsedenbal traveled to the front near Moscow to distribute gifts to Red Army troops. Stalin awarded Choibalsan the Order of Lenin for his outstanding effort in organizing the Mongolian economy for the delivery of aid in goods to Red Army in July 1944.

=== Internal developments ===
Despite the privations of wartime, Choibalsan and party leaders pressed on with what limited social progress they could manage while delivering much of the country's economic output to the Soviets. Choibalsan consistently sought Moscow's assent before making key policy decisions, even in minor matters, and made efforts to curry Moscow's favour whenever possible. At the Tenth Party Congress in March to April 1940, Choibalsan arranged the purge of MPRP Secretary-General Baasanjav and had him replaced with a new favorite of Stalin's, 24-year-old Minister of Finance Yumjaagiin Tsedenbal.

Although he relinquished leadership of the MPRP, Choibalsan continued to be the predominant force in Mongolian politics and pushed through reforms of the Mongolian constitution more in line with the 1936 USSR Constitution that effectively ended the influence and power of Buddhist church. Between 1941 and 1946 the country adopted Cyrillic script in place of the traditional Mongolian script. On 5 October 1942 Choibalsan University in Ulaanbaatar opened financed largely by the Soviets and with courses taught in Russian.

=== End of the war and pan-Mongolian aspirations ===
Choibalsan hoped to unite ethnic Mongols in Inner Mongolia with the MPR

An ardent Mongolian nationalist, Choibalsan never gave up a hope of uniting all of the Mongols under the auspices of the Mongolian People's Republic. Until 1945 he had encouraged an ethnic insurgency in Eastern Xinjiang (with Stalin's support), looking to strengthen the MPR's influence in the region and possibly beyond to Gansu and Qinghai. He saw the impending defeat of Japan as an opportunity to realize his long-held dream of a "Great Mongolia", the uniting of Outer and Inner Mongolia, and he fully expected Stalin's backing as a reward for Mongolia's steadfast support of the Soviets during the war.

On 10 August 1945, Mongolia declared war on Japan two days after the Soviet Union and both armies joined forces to attack Japanese strongholds in northern China during the Manchurian Strategic Offensive Operation. At the same time, Choibalsan unleashed a brief wave of pan-Mongolist nationalism through the press, calling for unification and encouraging a grassroots pan-Mongolist movement in Inner Mongolia. When Choibalsan ordered Mongolian troops to move south of the Great Wall as far as Zhangjiakou, Chengde and Batu-Khaalga, he was ordered by an angry Stalin to call them back. Conversely, it also marked greater Mongolia's permanent division into an independent Mongolian People's Republic and a neighboring Inner Mongolia.

== Post war ==
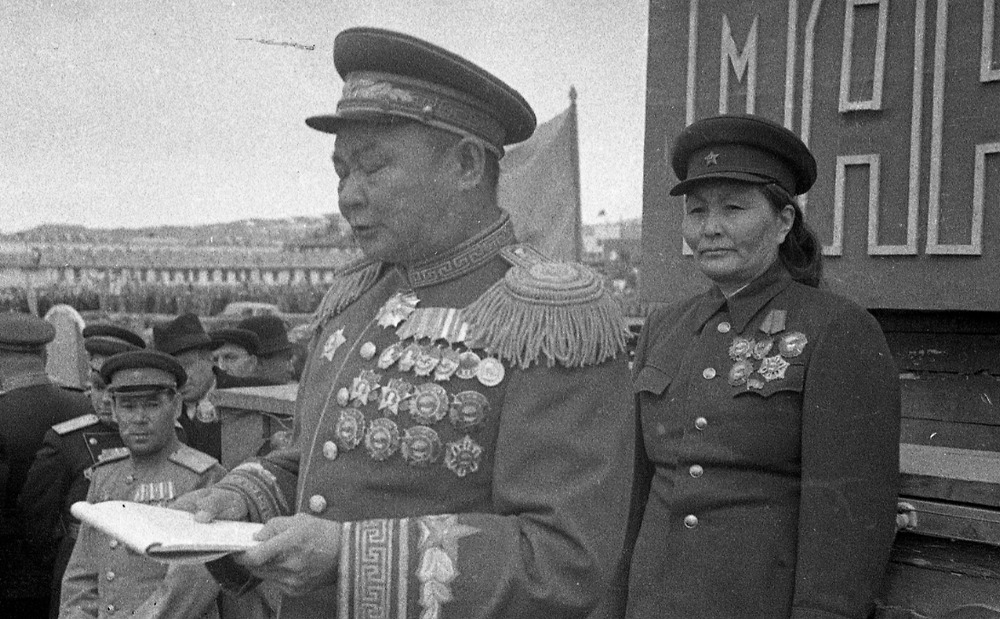
Choibalsan in military uniform at a military parade in the 1940s.

=== Modernisation efforts ===
With the end of the war, Mongolia embarked on a policy of "construction of the foundations of socialism." Proclaiming it "necessary to exterminate the concept of property," Choibalsan looked to modernize the country based on the Soviet model while expanding the communal agriculture sector. Funded largely through Soviet aid, the country's first five-year plan (1948–1952) focused on economic development, infrastructure construction, and doubling the country's livestock. Initiatives also were taken to redevelop the agrarian, industrial, and transportation sectors, to establish modern mining, and improve education and health services. Furthermore, the Choibalsan-led MPRP introduced modern medicine, brought about almost universal literacy, and cultivated widespread industrialization that led to greatly improved standards of living. Under his government the Nalaikh Coal Mine, the electric grid, the Züün Bayan petroleum factory, other metal and mineral factories, the Naushk-Ulaanbaatar railway, other transportation systems, and communications systems were developed.

In addition to establishing the country's first major university, Choibalsan initiated policies to increase the literacy rate and developed the 10 year elementary, middle and high school system. The 1949 Communist victory in China eliminated, at least temporarily, the threat on Mongolia's southern border, allowing the MPR to begin reducing its 80,000-strong army. Defense expenditures dropped from 33 percent of the total budget in 1948 to 15 percent in 1952.

=== Establishing international recognition ===
Although Choibalsan maintained a policy of stronger ties with the Soviet Union (in February 1946 he renewed the 1936 Protocol Treaty of Friendship and Mutual Assistance for another ten years and concluded the first bilateral agreement on economic and cultural cooperation), he nonetheless understood the importance of solidifying Mongolia's independence through international recognition. In 1948 the MPR established diplomatic relations with the DPRK (North Korea) and then with the People's Republic of China in 1949 (Mongolia was the first country to recognize the PRC). In 1950 the Eastern Bloc Communist states of East Germany, Hungary, Poland, and Czechoslovakia all established formal relations with the MPR.

=== Strengthening Party rule ===
While never reaching the frenzied levels of 1937–1939, arrests and executions of dissidents persisted until Choibalsan's death in 1952. Repressions were initiated in 1940, 1941, and 1942. In 1947, a political scandal known as "Port-Arthur" was fabricated around a fictitious plot to assassinate Choibalsan; eighty people were arrested, 42 of whom were executed. The MPRP Central Committee issued proclamations to fight alleged anti-revolutionary sentiment and Interior Ministry secret police cells sprouted throughout the country.

Party allegiance was strengthened by growing membership in the MPRP. Membership doubled from 1940 to 1947, reaching nearly 28,000.

=== Falling out with Stalin ===
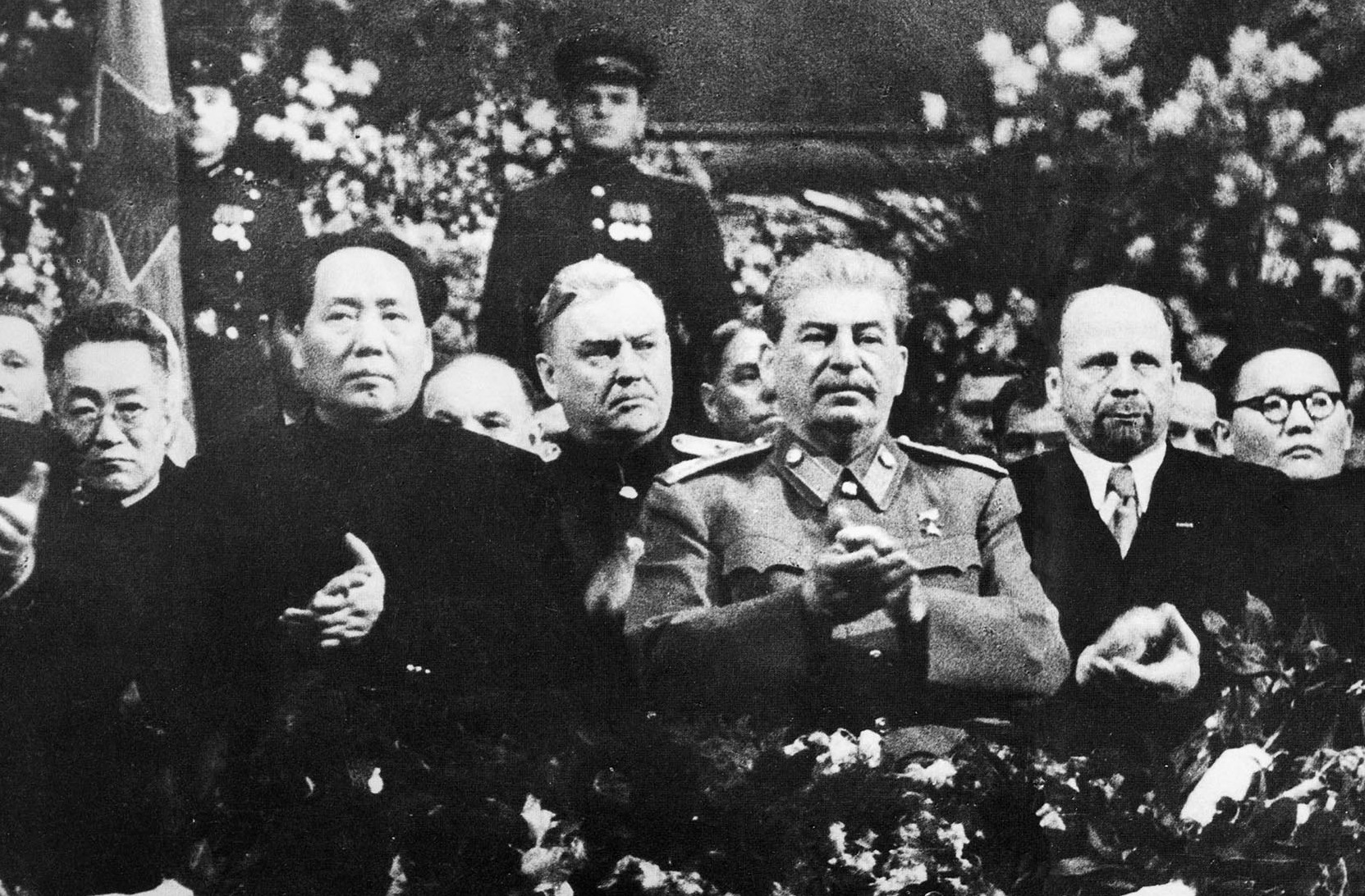
Choibalsan refused to attend Stalin's 70th-birthday celebration in 1949, sending Tsedenbal (far right) in his place.

Throughout his remaining years of life, Choibalsan continued to hold out hope of a united Mongolia, especially after the victory of Chinese communists in 1949. When it became clear that Stalin would never back unification, he grew increasingly disillusioned with his former hero. Personal relations between the two leaders deteriorated to the point that by 1949 Choibalsan refused to attend Stalin's 70th-birthday celebration in Moscow, sending Tsedenbal in his place. When in 1950 Tsedenbal and other protégés urged Choibalsan to have Mongolia follow the example of Tuva and petition Moscow to be permitted to join the Soviet Union, Choibalsan severely rebuked them.

== Illness, death, and burial ==
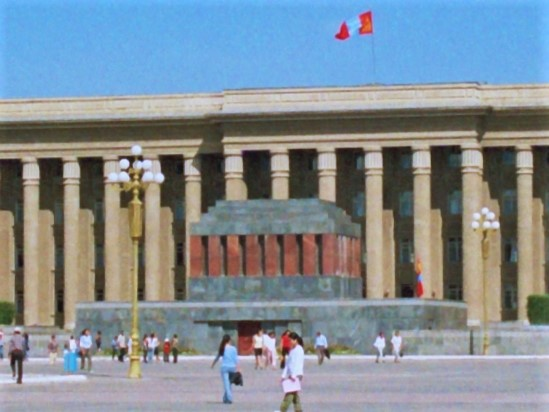
Choibalsan's remains were interred in Sükhbaatar's mausoleum from 1954 until 2005

In late 1951 Choibalsan traveled to Moscow to receive treatment for kidney cancer. According to some sources, this was at the insistence of the Soviets due to the lack of equipment in Mongolia to treat the illness. He was taken by train to the hospital for a week and he died there on 26 January 1952, soon after he had arrived.

Choibalsan's body was returned by a special train to Mongolia with full military honors and was given a state funeral in the capital which was attended by Mongolian and Soviet officials alike. Many days of mourning were declared throughout the country.

He was originally buried at the Altan-Ölgii National Cemetery in Ulaanbaatar. In July 1954 his body was moved to the newly built Sükhbaatar's Mausoleum in front of Government Palace on the north side of Sükhbaatar Square, where the two lay until after the 1990 Democratic Revolution. The Mausoleum was demolished in 2005 and the corpses of both rulers were ritually cremated under the supervision of the Buddhist clergy, and the ashes entombed again at the Altan-Ölgii cemetery.

== Personal life ==
Choibalsan married a devout Buddhist seamstress named Borotologai in 1921. Despite his womanizing, the two remained married until 1935. In 1929, he began an affair with the actress Diwa (Dewee), after which Borotologai requested a divorce in 1935. Choibalsan then married a woman named B. Gündegmaa.

He had no children with either of his wives. In 1937, Choibalsan adopted the son of one of his Interior Ministry subordinates. Later Gündegmaa adopted a girl, Suwd.

== Legacy ==
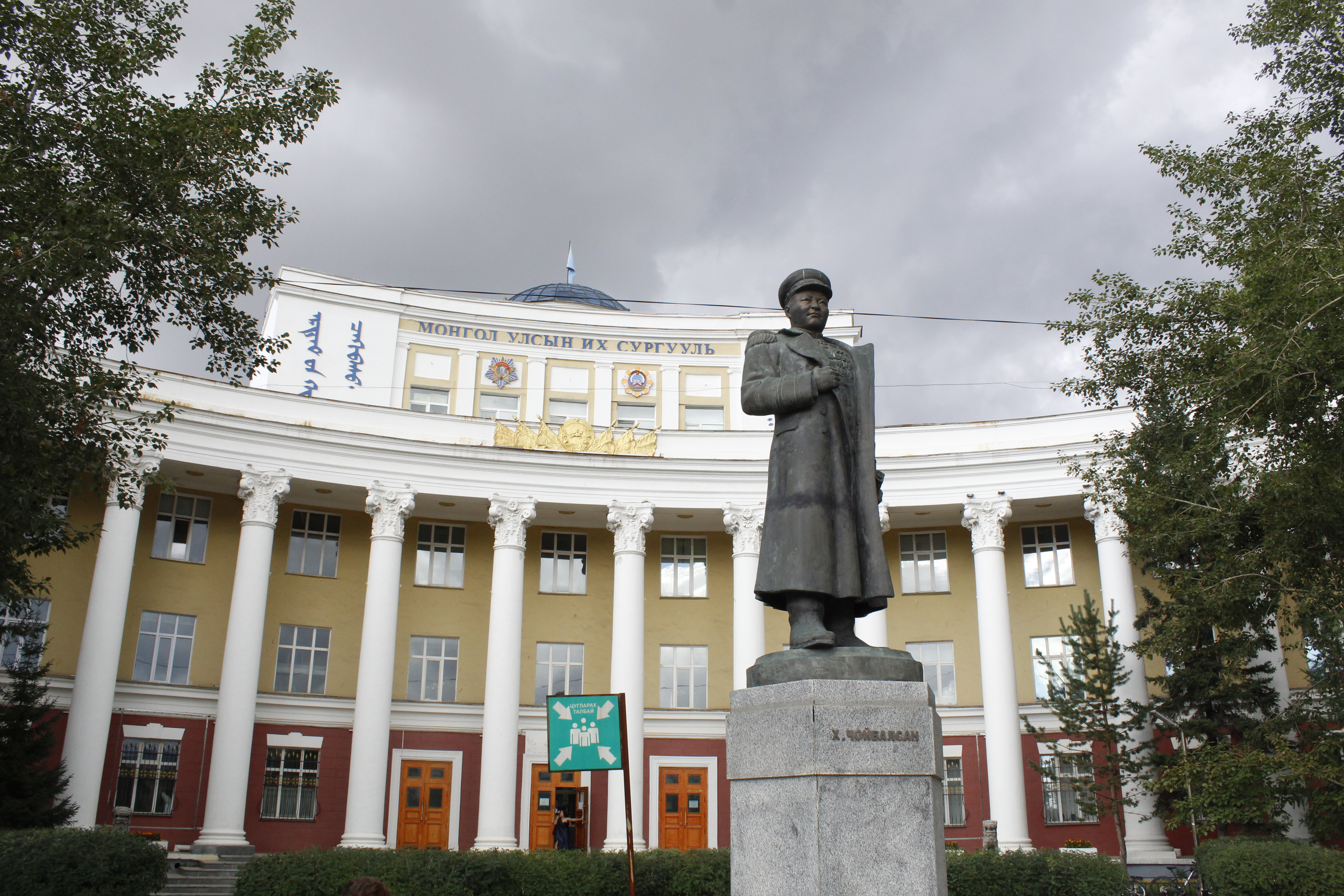
Choibalsan's statue stands in front of the National University in Ulaanbaatar.

Choibalsan's image in modern Mongolia remains mixed. At the time of his death, he was widely mourned as a hero, a patriot, and ultimately a martyr for the cause of Mongolian independence. Remnants of his strong personality cult, as well as successful efforts by his successor Tsendenbal to obstruct "de-Stalinization" efforts that could have shed light on Choibalsan's actions during the purges, helped solidify the positive regard many Mongolians held of their former leader. Official criticisms of Choibalsan in 1956 and 1969, which blamed him for "crude violations of the revolutionary law [that] led to many people perishing," and even the MPRP Central Committee's 1962 decision, in lock-step with Khrushchev's anti-Stalinization policies, to take "decisive measures to ensure complete liquidation of the harmful consequences of Kh. Choibalsan's cult of personality in all spheres of life," failed to generate serious public discourse on the matter.

Public anger over the violence of the purges falls predominantly on the Soviet Union and the NKVD, with Choibalsan viewed sympathetically (if not pathetically) as a puppet with little choice but to follow Moscow's instructions or else meet the fate of his predecessors Genden and Amar.

With the end of socialist rule in 1990, however, re-examining of Choibalsan's rule has occurred. Nevertheless, Choibalsan is not the object of strong resentment in Mongolia. While Stalin's statue, for example, was removed from the front of the National Library in 1990, shortly after the Democratic revolution, Choibalsan's statue, still stands in front of the National University in Ulaanbaatar, an institution he helped found and that for a time bore his name. Moreover, the capital of Dornod aimag continues to carry his name.

As for Choibalsan's lasting influence, what is clear is that his aggressively pro-Russian stance and his active role in increasing Mongolia's economic, political, and social reliance on the Soviet Union turned the country into a Soviet dependency, which has had a lasting impact on modern Mongolian identity and development.

In 2017, the Mongolian Bank unveiled a Khorloogiin Choibalsan coin.

== Political positions ==
Khorloogiin embraced except Marxism-Leninism also nationalism and pan-mongolism, he also held anti-chinese sentiment views.

== Awards ==
- Hero of the Mongolian People's Republic (twice)
- Order of Sukhbaatar (four times)
- Order of the Red Banner (five times)
- Order of the Red Banner of Labour
- Order of the Polar Star
- Medal "For Victory over Japan"
- Medal for Victory over Japan ("We won")
- Medal "25 Years of the People's Revolution"

=== Foreign ===
- Orders of Lenin (twice)
- Order of Suvorov, 1st degree
- Orders of the Red Banner (twice)
- Jubilee Medal "XX Years of the Workers' and Peasants' Red Army"
- Medal "For the Victory over Germany in the Great Patriotic War 1941–1945"
- Medal "For the Victory over Japan"
- Jubilee Medal "30 Years of the Soviet Army and Navy"
- Honorary Weapon
- Honored Worker of the NKVD of the USSR

== Notes ==
Political offices
Preceded by Jamtsangiin Damdinsüren	President of Mongolia; 24 January 1929 – 27 April 1930	Succeeded by Losolyn Laagan
Preceded by Anandyn Amar	Prime Minister of Mongolia; 24 March 1939 – 26 January 1952	Succeeded by Yumjaagiin Tsedenbal
