= Lanfang (disambiguation) =

Lanfang may refer to:

- Lanfang Republic (蘭芳共和國), a former state in West Kalimantan
- Lanfanghui (蘭芳會), the religious organization that preceded the republic
- Lanfang, Guangdong (蓝坊镇), town in Jiaoling County, Guangdong, China
- Lanfang, Jiangxi (蓝坊镇), town in Gao'an, Jiangxi, China

== See also ==
- Mei Lanfang
- Langfang (disambiguation)
