= Port Arthur Case =

Cold War Purge

The Port Arthur Case (Mongolian: Порт Артурын хэрэг) was a fabricated political case carried out between 1947 and 1949 in Mongolian People's Republic.

Over 80 Chinese nationals living in Mongolia were accused of having been recruited into the Kuomintang intelligence network engaged in espionage, sabotage, arson, and a plot to assassinate the Mongolian Prime Minister Khorloogiin Choibalsan. The accused, almost all of whom held Chinese rather than Mongolian citizenship, were arrested in three successive waves, interrogated under torture, and sentenced to death or long prison terms.

After the deaths of Choibalsan and Joseph Stalin in 1952 and 1953 and the subsequent relaxation of the political climate, Mongolian authorities reinvestigated the case. Internal Affairs Ministry and ruling-party commissions in 1954 and 1955 concluded that the alleged Kuomintang organization had never existed and that the case had been manufactured through coerced confessions and falsified evidence. At its meeting on May 18, 1955, the Political Bureau of the Central Committee of the Mongolian People's Revolutionary Party (MPRP) discussed the report of the commission that had investigated the so-called “Port Arthur Case.” The Bureau decided to release the people who had been convicted in connection with that case and to nullify the earlier decision that had authorized the use of illegal methods during the investigation. The convicts were rehabilitated in 1955, the officials responsible were prosecuted, and all victims have been formally acquitted by the Supreme Court of Mongolia by the year 2001.

== Background ==
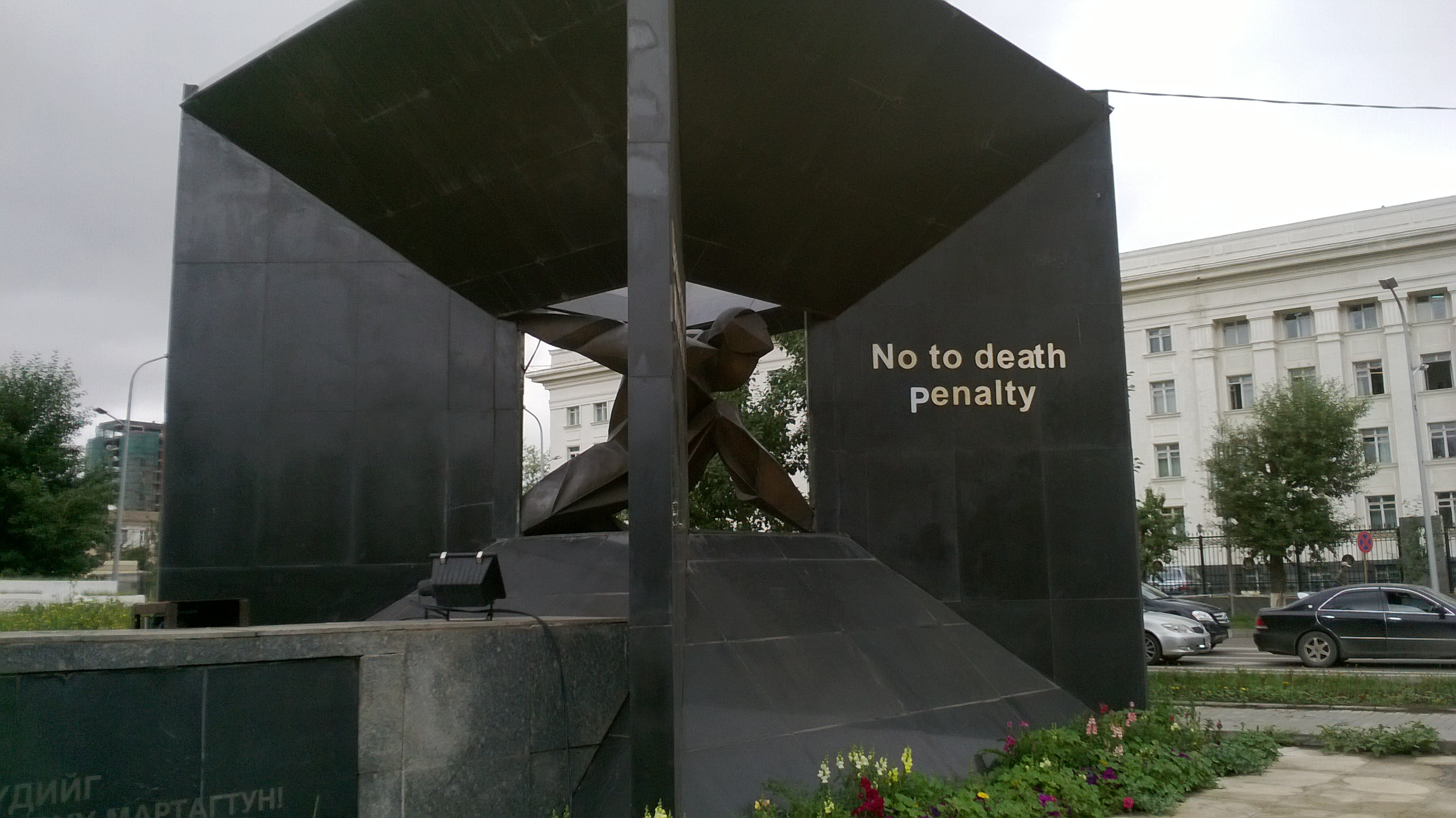
Monument dedicated to the memory of the political repression victims, erected in Ulaanbaatar, Mongolia in 1994

Political repression has been described as a defining tragedy of twentieth-century Mongolian history. Persecution on political grounds began soon after the establishment of the people's government: in the autumn of 1922 the first prime minister of the People's Government, Dogsomyn Bodoo, and thirteen others were executed. Over the following decades several thousand people lost their lives or property in roughly a dozen waves of political prosecution. The peak occurred during the Great Repression of 1937–1940, when more than 25,000 people were persecuted.

Although the scale of arrests declined after the early 1940s, practices such as unfounded suspicion, the manufacture of cases, and the use of torture during interrogation continued until 1949. The Port Arthur Case has been cited as one of the clearest later examples. Unusually, its victims were not Mongolians but resident Chinese. According to the 1940 census, 7,039 Chinese nationals lived in Mongolia, 4,425 of them in the capital city of Mongolia, Ulaanbaatar.

Kuomintang China had recognized the independence of the Mongolian People's Republic in 1946 but, owing to the ongoing Chinese Civil War, did not open a diplomatic mission in the country. By 1947–1948 it was becoming clear that the Soviet-backed Communists were winning the Chinese civil war while the Kuomintang faced defeat, leading later researchers to regard the notion that the Kuomintang was running an intelligence operation in Mongolia at that moment as implausible.

== Etymology ==
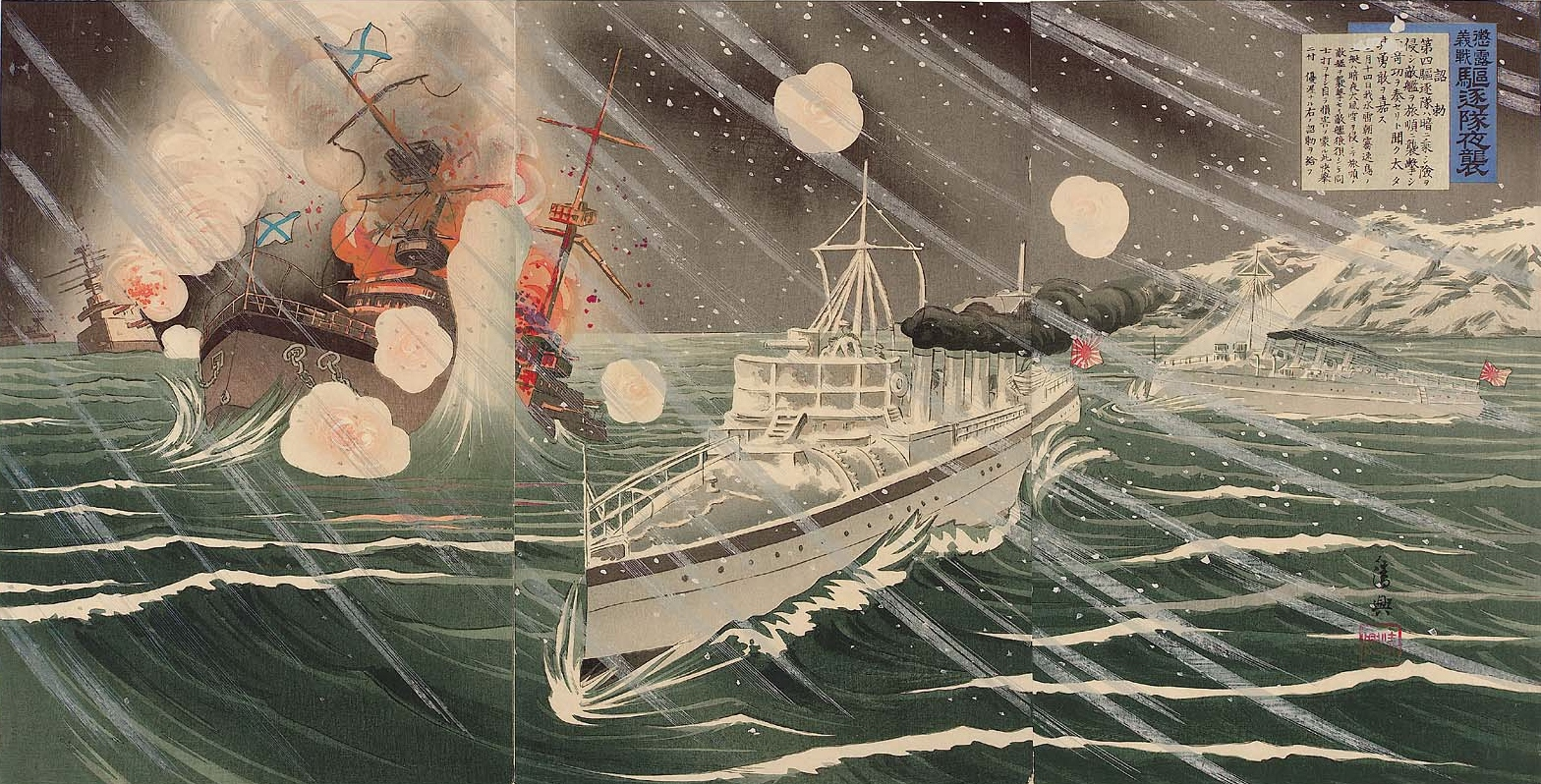
The Imperial Russian Port Arthur in China attacked by the Imperial Japanese Navy in 1904

The reason the fabricated case was given the name "Port Arthur" has never been established. Port Arthur was an ice-free naval port on the Yellow Sea. Soviet forces expelled Japanese troops from it on 22 August 1945, after which the Soviet Union and China signed an agreement to use the Port Arthur area as a naval base for thirty years, with the port to revert to Chinese ownership thereafter. In some publications, this case is erroneously transliterated as the Port-Artur Case or Port Artur Case.

In subsequent Mongolian political discourse, "Port Arthur" became a byword for trumped-up political prosecutions. The historian L. Jamsran, for instance, likened the later case against the politicians D. Tömör-Ochir and Ts. Lookhuz to "the Port Arthur Case" using it as shorthand for fabricated charges produced in a climate of fear.

== The Case ==
The operation was developed over about six months, with mobilizations conducted in three waves; the formal investigation ran from April 1948 to October 1949. It was run by the Third Division of the Ministry of Internal Affairs, which was responsible for the security of the marshal and the prime minister. The division head Ch. Mend and the officer N. Rentsendoo directed the case.

In 1947–1948, unemployed Chinese residents were being conscripted into compulsory labor. Using this situation, the Third Division acted through an informant, B. Demberel (codenamed "Buu"), a boiler mechanic at Choibalsan's residence who, according to the later inquiry, was illiterate in both Chinese and Mongolian and addicted to money and alcohol. On instructions from the division, Demberel circulated word that staff—a stoker, a cook, a gardener, a poultry keeper, and similar positions—were being hired at the marshal's residence, and that those taking such jobs would be exempted from compulsory labor and granted tax relief.

In September 1947, a trader named Jan-San-Mu approached Demberel at the market, saying that his business partner Jün-nön-güi was about to be sent to compulsory labor and asking whether work could be found for him. Demberel reported this, and his superiors instructed him to encourage the Chinese to apply for positions at the residence. A laboratory agent, Minjüür, posing as the residence's commandant, met the applicants and recorded their details; photographs, applications, and questionnaires were collected from Chinese who sought the jobs. These documents were later treated as evidence that the applicants had infiltrated the marshal's residence in order to kill him.

== Arrests and Interrogations ==
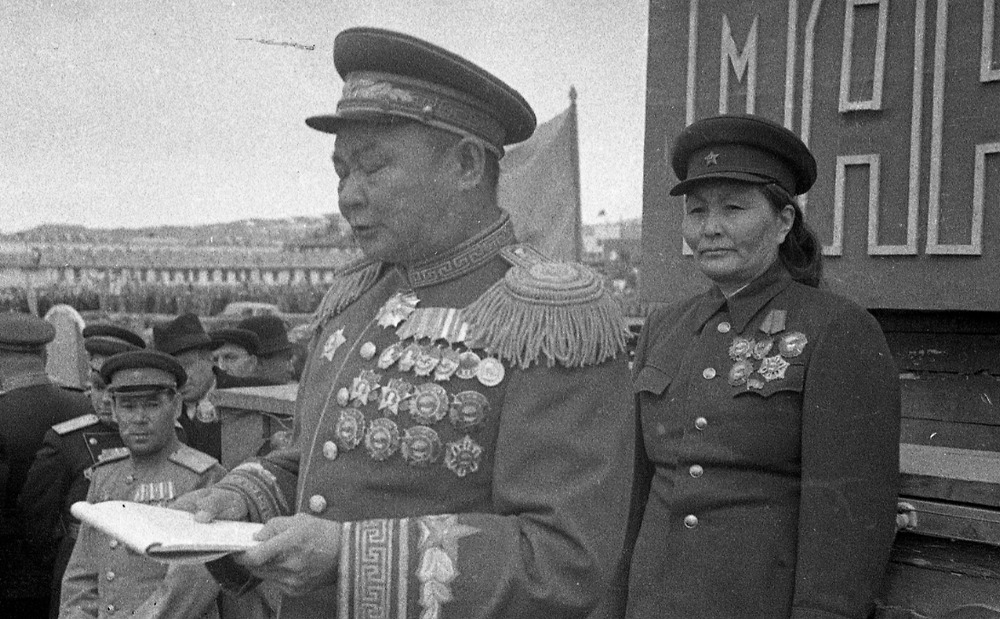
The Mongolian State Head Kh. Choibalsan at a military parade in the 1940s.

Jün-nön-güi and Jan-San-Mu were designated leaders of an alleged Kuomintang intelligence cell operating in Mongolia and were arrested and interrogated. In his testimony, Jün-nön-güi—a native of Shanxi who had come to Mongolia in 1925 and ran a private shop in Ulaanbaatar—stated that during a 1945 trip to Hohhot in Inner Mongolia he had been recruited by the Kuomintang military intelligence and tasked with conducting espionage in Mongolia and assassinating Mongolia's Prime Minister Khorloogiin Choibalsan. He was arrested on 29 April 1948 with a prosecutor's authorization on suspicion of preparing a terrorist act; the later inquiry concluded the confession had been obtained through beatings. According to some sources, around 80-100 Chinese were arrested and around 40 Chinese were executed.

Property confiscated from Jün-nön-güi included five gold rings, gold weighing about four jin, and 700 Chinese silver coins. He was interrogated 53 times between 29 April and 4 June 1948, during which 23 names were extracted. In the first wave, 28 Chinese were charged with intelligence and related offenses, and the property of those arrested was seized.

During the interrogations, unrelated offenses sometimes surfaced. In the second wave, for example, Go-Yu-Zan—a Chinese shopkeeper born in 1898 who had come to Mongolia in 1919 and had a Mongolian wife—was found to have dealt in 7–8 kg of opium. He admitted to the drug offense but denied any involvement in espionage.

A Special Court appointed by the Presidium of the State Little Khural handed down heavy sentences in a criminal verdict of 10 February 1949. By a decree of 2 July 1949, the clemency appeals of 18 people sentenced to death were rejected.

== Reinvestigation and First Rehabilitation (1954-1955) ==
Following the deaths of Choibalsan and Stalin in 1952 and 1953, the one-man dictatorships were dismantled and principles of collective leadership were restored. On the initiative of Dashiin Damba, First Secretary of the Central Committee of the Mongolian People's Revolutionary Party (MPRP), a review of past cases began. A commission headed by Nasaljav, established by ministerial order on 1 March 1954, examined the Port Arthur Case between 2 March and 24 June 1954.

The commission found, among other things, that the supposed "active leader" Jü-shin-güi had in fact refused to come to the capital and that Jan-San-Mu had declined to work at the marshal's residence, making the arrest of Jün-nön-güi on suspicion of terrorism baseless. It documented that investigators had used beatings, starvation, forced intoxication, forced opium consumption, confinement in an unheated punishment cell, and intimidation to construct the image of a "Kuomintang counter-revolutionary intelligence, sabotage, arson and espionage organization." It also found that innocent people who had traveled to the provinces on private business were falsely recorded as having foreign intelligence contacts. Of 28 ministry informants involved, 22 were singled out for the harshest treatment, and secret notes were passed to the special court's judge—an action the inquiry characterized as the elimination of witnesses. People who tried to expose the case as false were dismissed from the ministry or themselves implicated.

In 1954 Damba obtained a Politburo resolution establishing a higher commission to investigate the case. At a closed session in December 1954, the ministry's own preliminary finding that the case was fabricated was confirmed, and the commission concluded that the existence of a large Kuomintang espionage and sabotage organization was unproven. Its recommendations included reprimanding senior officials—among them the Internal Affairs minister Tsedev, the state prosecutor Jambaldorj, and the special court head Tseden-norov—acquitting and releasing the 32 Chinese still imprisoned, returning their confiscated property and paying compensation, providing financial aid to bereaved families (including those with orphaned children), and holding Mend, Rentsendoo, and Demberel criminally responsible.

In May 1955 the party Politburo discussed the commission's conclusions, ordered the release of those wrongly convicted, and held the responsible ministry officials accountable. The special oversight commission attached to the ministry was dissolved and reconstituted as a rehabilitation commission under the Presidium of the Great Khural. The 28 victims of the first wave were acquitted of charges brought under the 1942 Criminal Code. Mongolian historiography notes that this rehabilitation work began before the 20th Congress of the Communist Party of the Soviet Union (held 14–25 February 1956), at which the cult of personality around Stalin was denounced.

=== Prosecution of Mongolian Officials ===
The Central Committee compiled data on which investigators had interrogated which prisoners and with what results, identifying ten officials. Documented conditions of confinement included beatings, food deprivation, and confinement in a cement-floored, unheated punishment cell without bedding, used until 1949; one Chinese prisoner died during interrogation. In May 1956 the responsible minister, Major-General Dorj, recommended removing the ten named officials from the apparatus, a recommendation that was carried out.

Mend, Rentsendoo, and Demberel were prosecuted and confessed to having abused their positions, conducted the investigation unlawfully, and falsely implicated others. By a special court resolution of 10 July 1955, Mend and Rentsendoo were sentenced to terms of six to eight years' imprisonment.

== Second Rehabilitation (1990–2001) ==
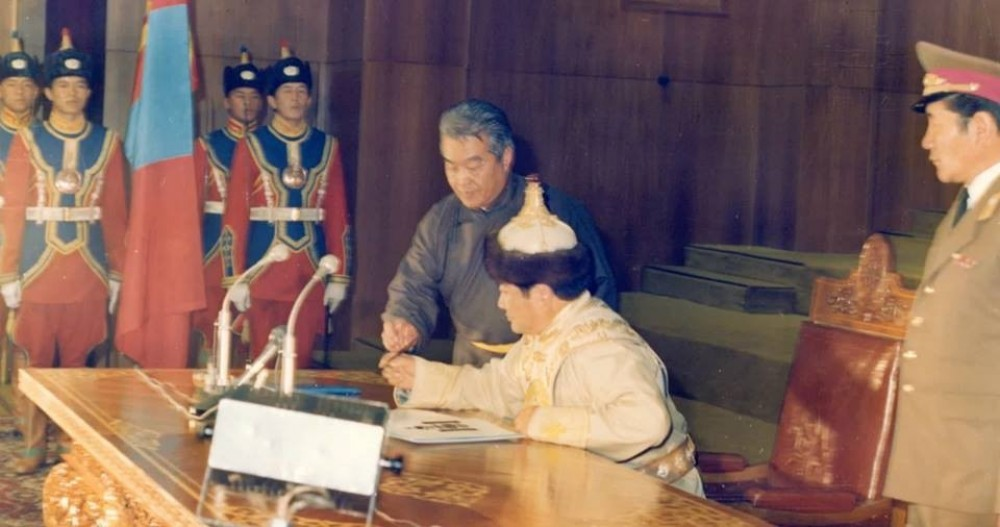
President P. Ochirbat ratifying the Constitution of Mongolia in January 1992

In December 1990, the presidential decree, issued by Punsalmaagiin Ochirbat, established a State Commission to direct the rehabilitation of victims of political repression, restore their reputations, and provide compensation. On the basis of a petition by H. Battömör, the son of a second-wave victim named Han-Chin-dai, and a 1994 prosecutorial decision citing newly discovered circumstances, the second-wave case file—covering 27 people including Shin-Van-Hüi—was reinvestigated by the rehabilitation section of the General Intelligence Agency's investigation department. By then no living witnesses or victims remained to be questioned.

The 1994 inquiry again found no evidence that a Kuomintang organization had existed and confirmed that the original investigation had been unlawful. On 15 October 2001 the Supreme Court of Mongolia (resolution no. 372) annulled the 1949 verdict against the 27 second-wave defendants and acquitted them, finding that the "Port Arthur" affair was a fabricated case lacking the elements of any crime.

== Interpretations ==
The purpose of the case, its scale, and who initiated it remain uncertain, in part because many of the relevant documents in the Special Archive are still classified. The Mongolian Professor and Historian Urangua Jamsran argues that the operation appears to have had a definite purpose and is unlikely to have been conceived single-handedly by the division head Mend, but stresses that any conclusion beyond speculation requires access to documents that researchers cannot currently obtain. The case concluded around the time the Communists took power in China and the People's Republic of China was proclaimed on 1 October 1949. The Soviet authorities began to support the Chinese Communist Party from 1948 onwards while the Nationalist government of China inclined more towards the United States, the Cold War adversary of the Soviets. Therefore, Soviet instructors in Mongolia took part in the investigation of the Port Arthur Case, ostensibly to support efforts to secure a favorable outcome in the Chinese civil war; archival records name an instructor recorded as "Zobotin," likely B. Zabotin, who worked as an instructor at the Internal Affairs Ministry from 1947 to 1950. The Mongolian politician Nyantaishiryn Lkhamsüren attributed the organization of the case to the Third Division official Tsend together with the Soviet security adviser Aleksandr Langfang (1907–1990), whose interrogation methods were reportedly taught at the state security academy as the "Langfang Method." Some accounts link the broader episode to Yumjaagiin Tsedenbal; the 1942 secret Politburo resolution that had authorized beating suspects bore the signatures of Choibalsan, Tsedenbal, and Ch. Sürenjav and was later annulled. The Mongolian writer and political commentator Baabar also identifies Yu. Tsedenbal as the main initiator of this purge. Others argue that Tsedenbal, Zedev, and other younger communist leaders of Mongolia orchestrated this case to demonstrate their loyalty to Choibalsan and to consolidate communist rule in the country.

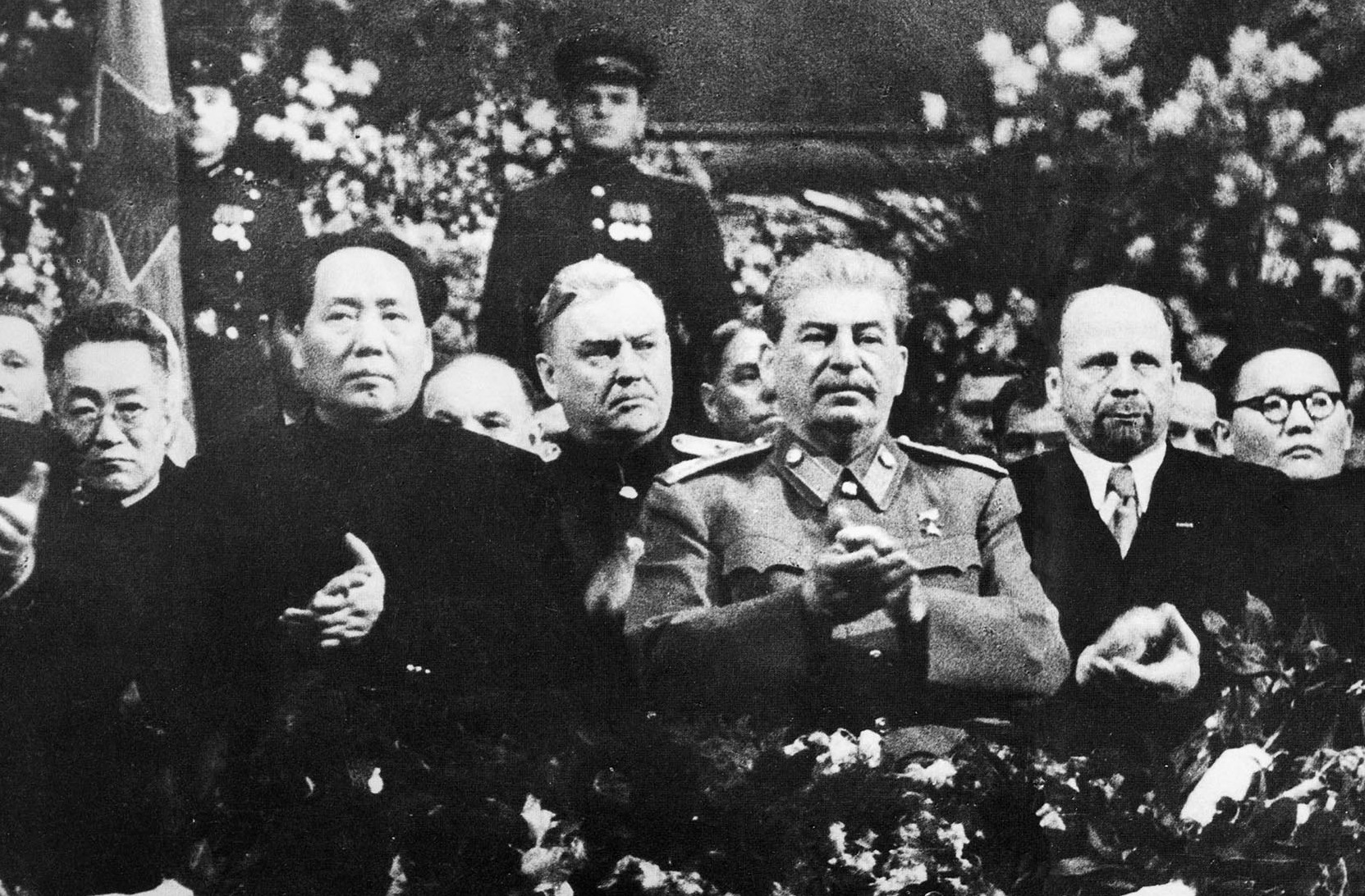
Tsedenbal (far right) at Joseph Stalin's 71st birthday ceremony with Mao Zedong, Nikolai Bulganin, and Walter Ulbricht, 1949

The Mongolian politician, T. Genden, who headed a commission reviewing the repressions and published a 1999 memoir, Gurvan tümen hünii am' ("The Lives of Thirty Thousand People"), credited Damba with first exposing the fabricated case; he linked the resulting rift between Damba and Tsedenbal to Damba's own later removal and internal exile. Urangua leaves open whether the case was a local instance of the Stalinist doctrine that class enemies intensify their resistance as socialism advances, a Mongolian echo of her powerful neighbor the Soviet Union's Leningrad affair, or a trace of factional struggle among the Mongolian leadership.

== See also ==
- Maimaicheng
- Mongolian People's Republic
- Lhümbe Case
- Demographics of Mongolia
- Ethnic Chinese in Mongolia
