= Alise Stein-Anvelt =

Estonian politician

Alise Stein-Anvelt (also Alice Leevald or Alice Levald; 20 October 1900 Vardi Parish (now Märjamaa Parish), Harrien County – 15 April 1991 Tallinn) was an Estonian politician. She was a member of II Riigikogu. She was a member of the Riigikogu since 18 February 1924. She replaced Johannes Reesen. On 22 March 1924, she resigned her position and was replaced by Jaak Nanilson. She was married to Bolshevik revolutionary and writer Jaan Anvelt.
