= Dam Din =

Legendary Khmer figure

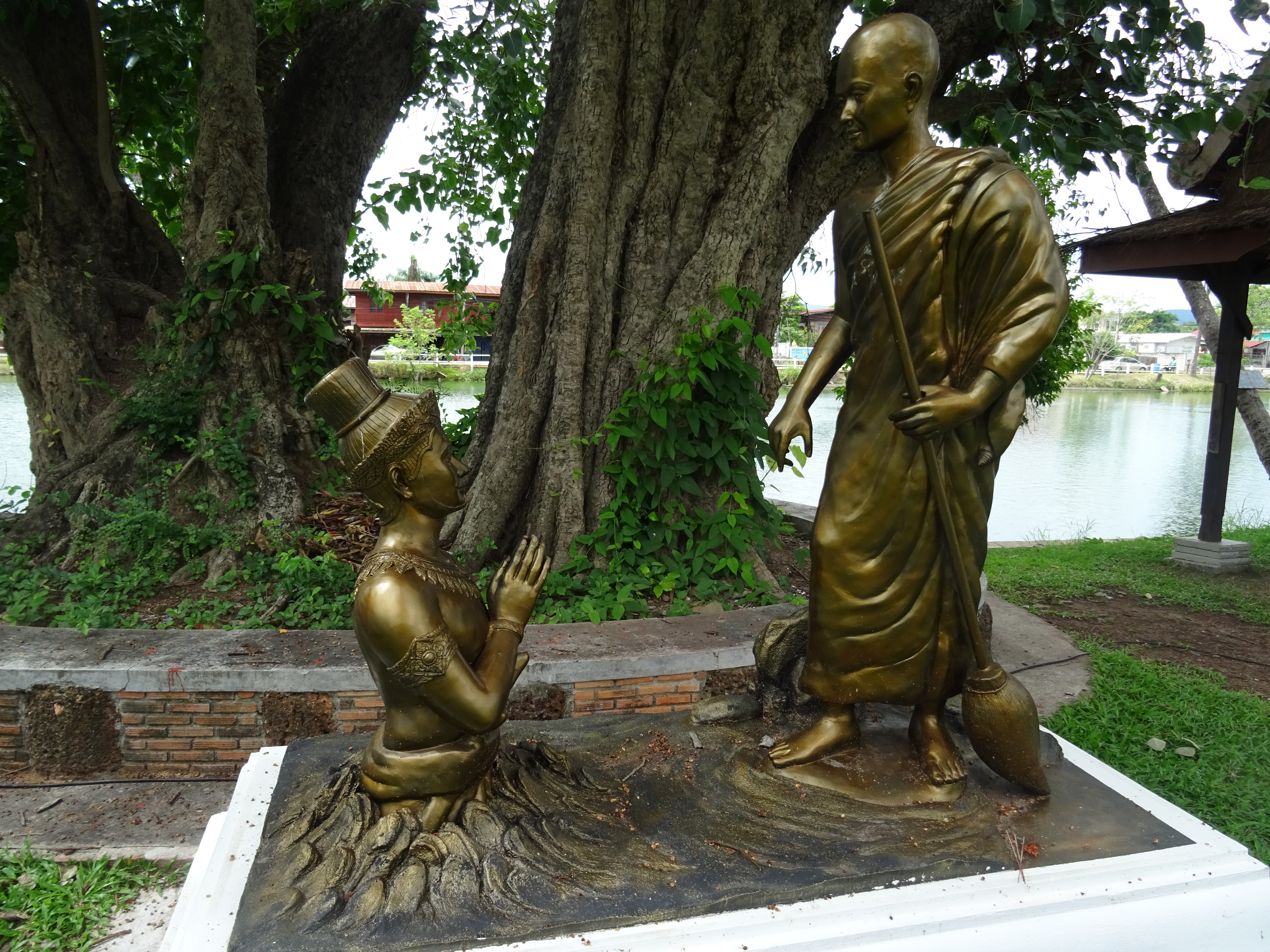
The Memorial of Phra Ruang and Dam Din in Sukhothai.

Dam Din (Khmer: ដំឌិន), also known as Chao Ponhea Techo Chrek Dey (Khmer: ចៅពញាតេជោជ្រែកដី) or Techo Dam Din (Khmer: តេជោដំឌិន), or the underground-traveling Khmer, is a legendary figure from Khmer history, usually described as the general who opposed Phra Ruang who wanted to establish the first Thai kingdom free from the rule of the ancient Khmer Empire.

== Origins ==
The story of Techo Dam Din originates from some versions of the Thai legend of Phra Ruang; the earliest known written account that mentions the figure is found in the Northern Chronicles compiled by Phra Wichianpricha (Noi) in 1807. The document refers to the figure as Khom dam din ('earth-diving Khmer'), and makes no mention of the name Techo.

Khmer versions of the tale are found in the Cambodian Royal Chronicles; it is not known from Khmer folktales. The earliest known mention is found in the chronicle of Vatt Kok Kak, which was compiled in 1869 during the reign of King Norodom, and several later versions reproduce or build upon the story. The Cambodian versions are likely derived from the Thai source, as the name Dam Din is taken from the Thai words dam (Thai: ดำ) 'to dive', and din (ดิน) 'earth'. The "underground-travelling Khmer" can be interpreted as a Thai catchphrase that may signify according to nationalist Thai authors a sense of an inferior or untrustworthy neighbour against whom Thailand must always be on guard. It may well refer to the supernatural powers connecting humans and the underworld as in the related legend of Khleang Moeung. In the Khmer versions, however, Dam Din or Domden is regarded as part of the figure's proper name, sometimes in addition to the name Techo/Decho.

== Legend ==
=== Khmer version ===
In the Khmer version Dam Din was a high-ranking official during the reign of King Botum Suryavong. Because of the latter's gift of prescience, he allegedly knew that Thailand would one day have a king and Siam would be considered as a separate land free from paying tribute to the Khmer Empire.

The King was angered by the arrogance of Ponhea Rong who had stood in his presence in the middle of the royal hall in front of him. When the King ordered Dam Din to arrest him, Ponhea Rong fled into the shadows. Dam Din had to bring 300 soldiers to encroach on the land to capture Ponhea Rong in Sukhothai district. Ponhea Rong ran and took refuge in a Thai Buddhist pagoda. One afternoon, while Ponhea Rong was clearing the courtyard in front of the temple, Dam Din appeared right in front of him after travelling underground. Ponhea Rong was well aware that they had come to arrest him, but as he was dressed as a monk, they did not dare and Ponhea Rong cast a spell on Dam Din. Suddenly, Dam Din's body gradually became harder and harder and turned to stone to this day. The rest of the troops who followed retreated back to report to the king. After the death of the Siamese king in Sukhothai, Ponhea Rong left the monastery and came to rule Siam. From then on, Ponhea Rong changed his name to King Chandrathipati, the new Siamese king. Popularly known as Ponhea Rong, he attempted to assassinate the Khmer king twice more.

=== Thai version ===
Dam Din is presented in Thai popular history as the Khmer general who was defeated by the first legendary ruler of Siam, King Phra Ruang. A common version of the Phra Ruang legend is that he was a Thai chieftain of Lavo (Lopburi) with supernatural powers of speech. The Thais had to deliver water to the Khmer capital as tax, and Phra Ruang used his powers to make bamboo baskets waterproof so that they could be used to carry the water instead of heavy clay jars, causing fear among the Khmer that he could imperil the hydraulic resources of the Angkorian Empire. When the Khom king wanted him dead, Phra Ruang escaped and was ordained as a monk at Sukhothai. A Khmer spy, Damn Din, magically "diving underground", was sent to find him, but not knowing Phra Ruang's face, inadvertently asked him when they met. Phra Ruang told the spy to stay there, and his powers turned him into stone.

== Posterity ==
=== Iconography ===
Dam Din is often represented in and around Angkorian ruins, temples and pagodas in Cambodia, such as the Banteay Prey Nokor in Kampong Cham.

=== Literature ===
There have been many modern adaptations of the legend in Thai literature. One of the best known is a 1917 play by King Vajiravudh (Rama VI), who explained the supernatural powers as acts of Phra Ruang's great wit.

=== Music and Ballet ===
Dam Din is the subject of a dance in the traditional Thai ballet. The text of the drama of Khõm Dam Din was written by King Rama VI but the words were altered around 1930 by his brother King Rama VII to make them fit the Khmer style music better and it has been used ever since.

=== Toponymy ===
Dam Din is the name given to a road in the municipality of Phnom Penh that runs from the Toul Kork antenna to the Cannon roundabout.

=== Modern retellings ===
The story of Techo Dam Din has been incorporated into Cambodian history textbooks, and was made into the epic film Decho Domden in 2001. However, the film portrays Techo as a general who leads Cambodian armies to victory over the invading Siamese, scenarios more reflective of Siam's invasions of Cambodia in the 15th and 16th centuries.

== Sources ==
- "ตำนานพระร่วง". www.thaistudies.chula.ac.th (in Thai). Institute of Thai Studies, Chulalongkorn University. 29 September 2018 [7 October 2012].
