= Aleksandr Langfang =

Aleksandr Ivanovich Langfang (Russian: Александр Иванович Лангфанг) (1907–1990) was a Soviet torturer, security officer and Lieutenant-General in the NKVD.

== Early years ==
Langfang was born in Brest-Litovsk, into a family of a railroad worker. The Langfang family is French by origin: his ancestors presumably remained in Russia after Napoleon's campaigns, but by the 20th century the family had become completely Russified.

He began working as a concrete worker, then a spinner's apprentice and spinner while still a teenager. In 1924 he joined the Komsomol, becoming the secretary of the cell. In 1925 he was accepted as a candidate member, and later as a member of the All-Union Communist Party (Bolsheviks).

In 1929 he was drafted into the Red Army. For a year he studied at the school for junior command staff of a separate communications company of the 3rd Crimean Rifle Division, then served as a platoon commander in the same company.

== Career in OGPU ==
Langfang went to work for OGPU as a trainee in 1931. He rose through the ranks and by 1937 was the assistant to the head of the 9th section of the 3rd department (counterintelligence) of the NKVD. He was given responsibility for the investigation of Bolshevik luminaries, such as Nikolay Krestinsky, Osip Piatnitsky, Vilhelm Knorin, Boris Melnikov, and on a special mission Jaan Anvelt as well as many other less notable prisoners.

In 1940 Langfang was sent to Greece on a foreign intelligence assignment. He returned to the Soviet Union after the Nazis's invasion. He was given a number of special assignments in the Xinjiang area. On June 15, 1946, he attempted to commit suicide by shooting himself in the heart but survived and returned to work for the MGB, attaining the rank of general.

The Mongolian politician Nyantaishiryn Lkhamsüren attributed the organization of the Port Arthur Case in Mongolia to the Third Division official Tsend together with the Soviet security adviser Aleksandr Langfang, whose interrogation methods were reportedly taught at the state security academy as the "Langfang Method."

== Disgrace, arrest and imprisonment ==
Langfang was dismissed from the KGB on August 20, 1955. He was stripped of the rank of "lieutenant general" on August 17, 1956, then arrested on April 4, 1957.

He was found guilty of killing Jaan Anvelt while interrogating him on 11 December 1937 and sentenced to 15 years of imprisonment under Art. 58-7, 182, Part 1 and Part 4, 58-2 of the Criminal Code of the RSFSR. He served his full term and was released in 1972. He settled in Moscow, where he died in 1990.
