= Phra Ruang =

Legendary Thai figure

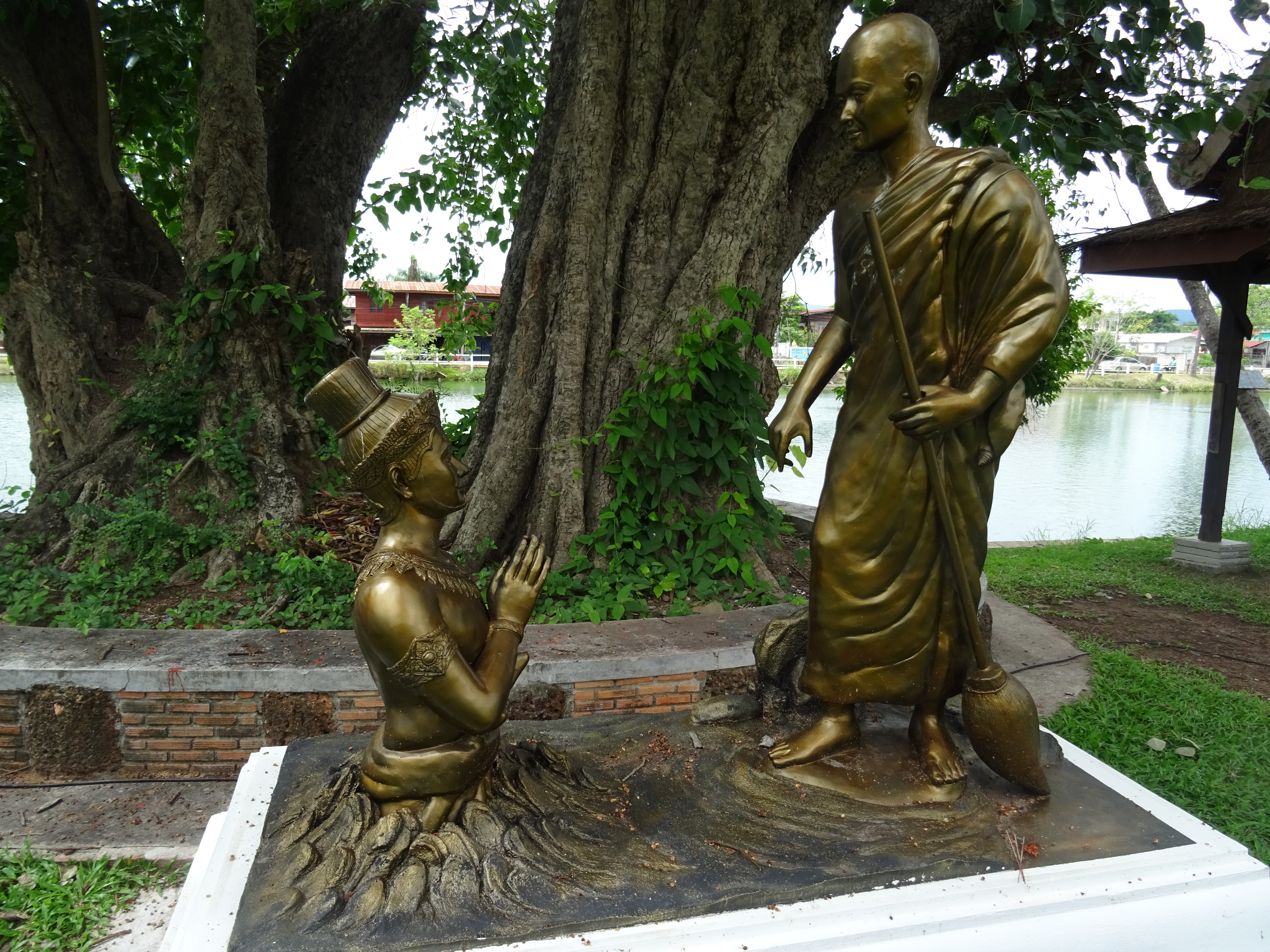
The Memorial of Phra Ruang and Khom Dam Din in Sukhothai.

Phra Ruang (Thai: พระร่วง) is a legendary figure in Thai folklore and history, often considered the founder of the first Thai kingdom who liberated the Thai people from the rule of the ancient Khmer Empire. The name "Phra Ruang" may have served as a royal title for multiple kings of the Sukhothai Kingdom, including King Ramkhamhaeng the Great, and appears in religious, literary, and oral traditions including the Trai Phum Phra Ruang, a Sukhothai-era religious text describing the Buddhist cosmology. The legend is well-known in the regions of Sukhothai, Kamphaeng Phet, Phitsanulok, Uttaradit, and Tak.

== Recording ==
The legend of Phra Ruang appears in multiple versions, including the Phra Ruang of Sawankhalok and the Phra Ruang of Lavo. He is referenced in numerous chronicles and oral histories such as the Northern Chronicles, Mon-Burmese Chronicles, the Testimony of the People of the Old Capital, the Chiang Mai Chronicle, and the Cambodian Royal Chronicles.

King Vajiravudh (Rama VI) adapted the Lavo version into a modern play in 1917, portraying Phra Ruang’s powers as metaphorical representations of intelligence and wit. The legend was also adapted into the musical play Anupap Pho Khun Ramkhamhaeng by Luang Vichitvadakan (Vichit Vichitvadakan).

== Legendary content ==
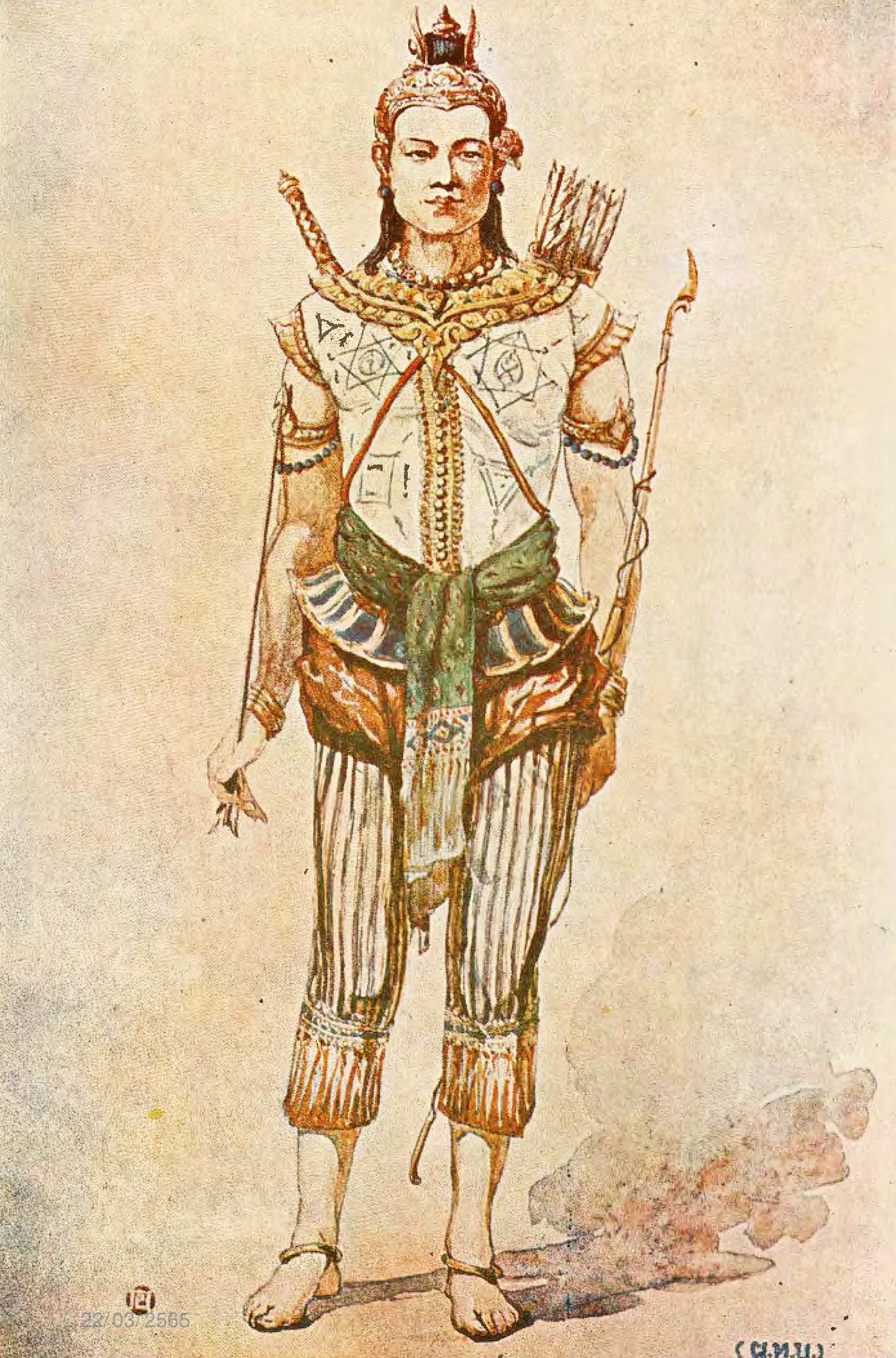
Painting from The Royal Composition of Phra Ruang by King Rama VI

One version describes Phra Ruang of Lavo as a chieftain with supernatural powers of speech. When Thai people were required to transport water in heavy clay jars as tribute to the Khmers, Phra Ruang used his powers to waterproof bamboo baskets instead. Offended, the Khmer king sought his execution. Phra Ruang escaped and ordained as a monk in Sukhothai. A Khmer spy, sent underground to locate him, unwittingly asked Phra Ruang for directions. Phra Ruang responded with a sacred command that turned the spy to stone.

Another version, Phra Ruang of Sawankhalok, recounts that he renounced royal life to become an ascetic under the name Phra Aphai Rajakamani. He and his brother Ritthikumarn are said to have traveled to China, where they introduced Sangkhalok ceramic technology to Siam. Some historians believe Phra Ruang may be identified with Chao Nakhon In of Suphan Buri.

== Name and identity ==
According to Prince Damrong Rajanubhab, "Phra Ruang" may have served as a dynastic title for all kings descending from King Ramkhamhaeng. This is evidenced in chronicles describing the pact among Phra Mangrai, Phra Ngam Mueang, and Phra Ruang to found Nakhon Ping. Even during the Ayutthaya period, royal descendants of Sukhothai kings were referred to as members of the Wong Phra Ruang lineage.

== Cultural legacy ==
Phra Ruang is commemorated through statuary and sacred art, including: - Luang Pho Phra Ruang at Wat Mahannoparam - Phra Ruang Rojanarit at Phra Pathom Chedi - Sculptures of Phra Ruang and Phra Lue at Wat Phra Sri Rattana Mahathat Ratchaworawihan

The legend is also reflected in place names and folk items, such as Phra Ruang's hot spring at Wat Trapang Thonglang, the Phra Ruang Proverbs, Phra Ruang Dam, Khao Tok Phra Ruang (Phra Ruang Popcorn), Phra Ruang Fish, and the Thai warship HTMS Phra Ruang.

== See also ==
- Dam Din, character based on Khmer retelling of the legend
