= Saritphong Dam =

Coordinates: 17°00′10″N 99°40′41″E

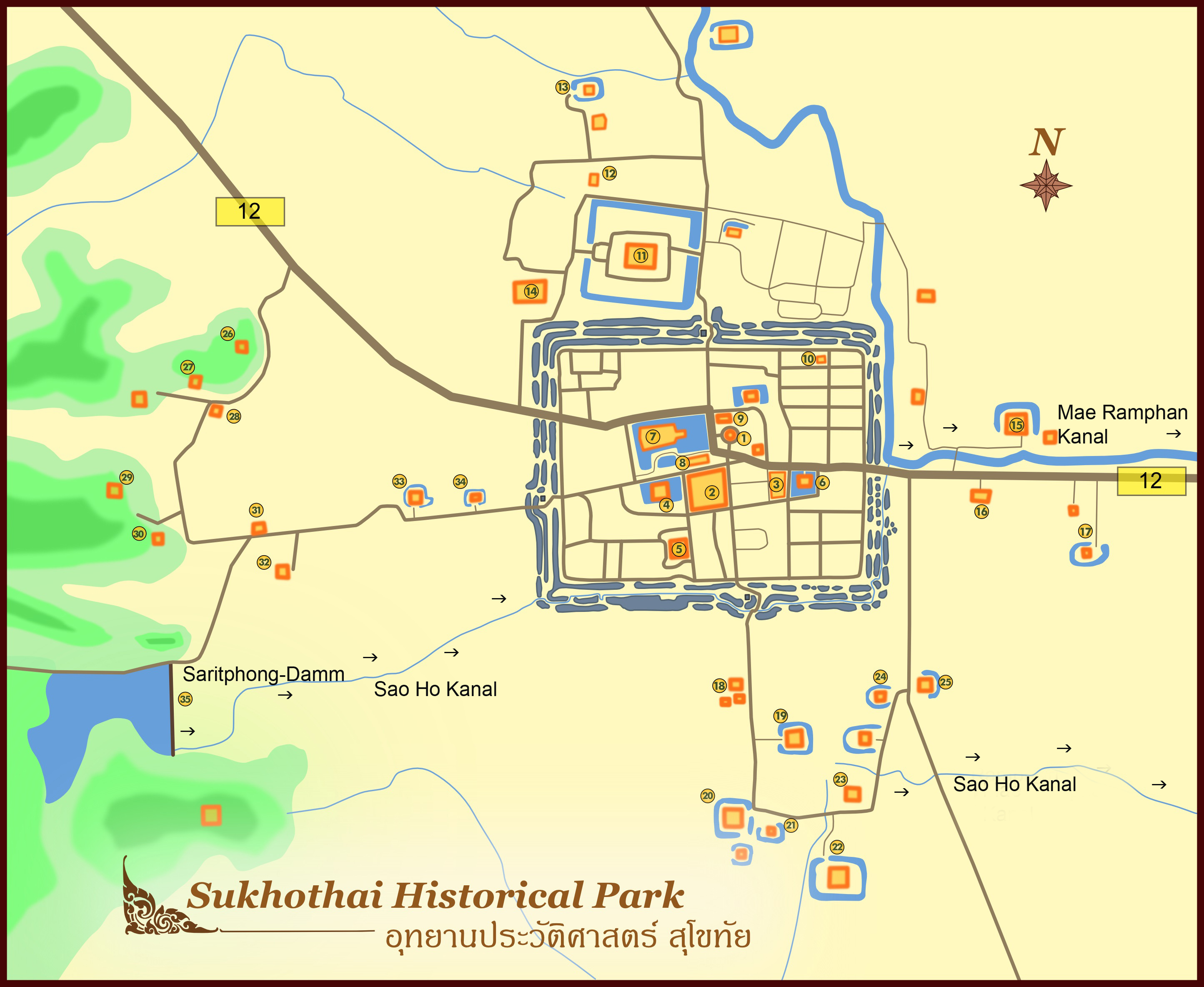
Sukhothai Historical Park, showing reservoir

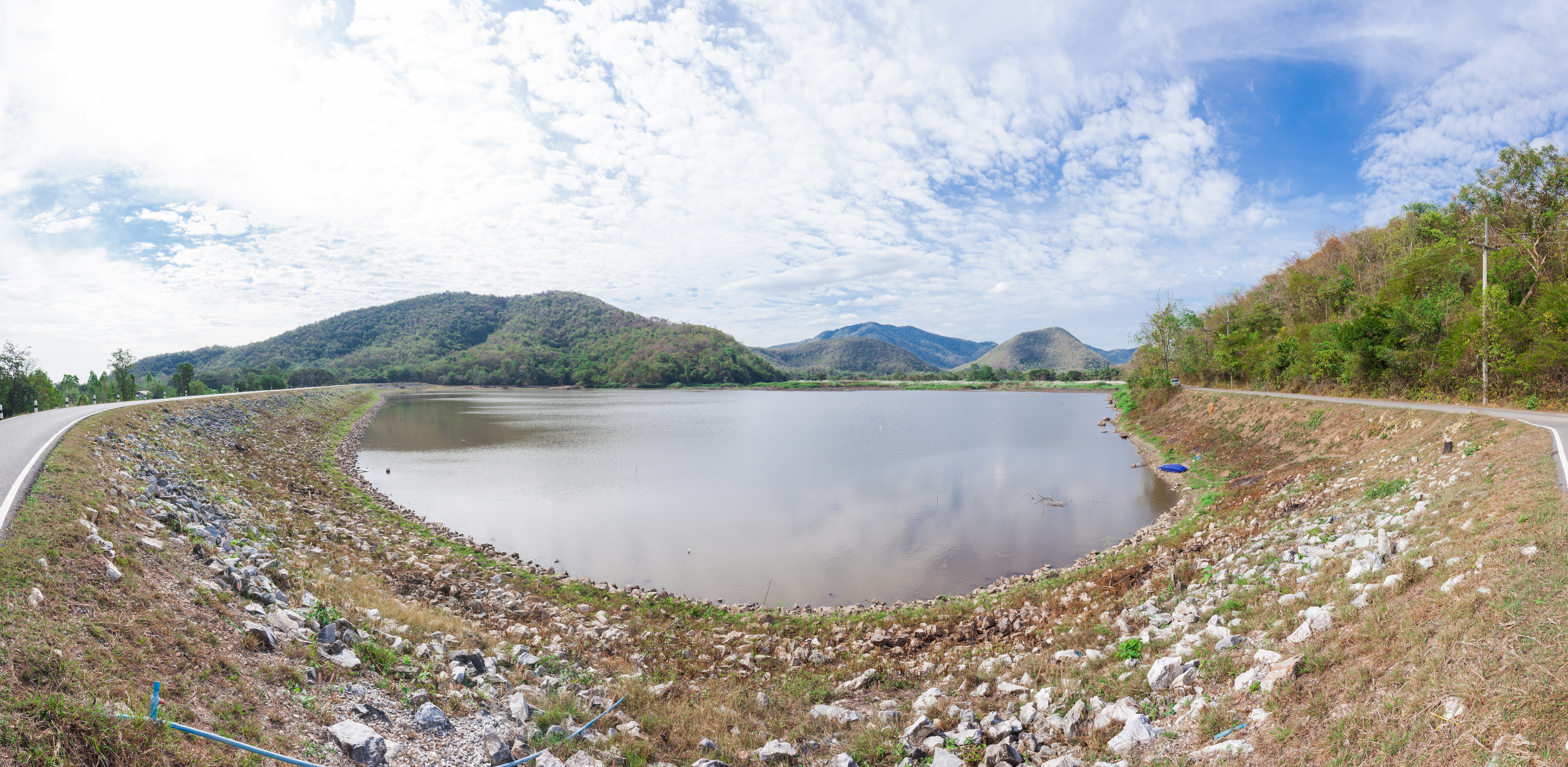
Saritphong Dam, January 2019

The Saritphong Dam (Thai: สรีดภงค์), also known as Phra Ruang Dam, (Thai: ทำนบพระร่วง), is a dam dating back to the Sukhothai Kingdom. It is in the southwest of the UNESCO World Heritage Sukhothai Historical Park in the Mueang Kao Subdistrict of Mueang Sukhothai District of Sukhothai Province in northern Thailand. The Saritphong Dam was built in the 14th century to provide water to the capital of the ancient kingdom Sukhothai.

== History ==
The ancient capital had no dependable source of water during the dry season, so a dam was constructed between the mountains of Khao Kieo Ai Ma and Khao Phra Bat Yai some three kilometers west of the city. Here, the water of mountain streams and rainy season precipitation was captured. The water was then conveyed to the city by the Sao-Ho Canal, using a natural slope, where it was divided into four reservoirs: Ngoen (silver), Thong (gold), So (lemon pond), and Tra Kua (water spinach) inside the city walls. Another canal called Mae Ramphan carried wastewater away to the east to the Mae Nam Yom.

In the mid-20th century, the dam was refurbished and expanded by the Royal Irrigation Department and the Fine Arts Department, while preserving its historic character. After renewal, its length is 487 meters with a thickness of eight meters and a height of 10.5 meters. Its storage capacity is around 400,000 cubic meters.
