= Damdinsürengiin Altangerel =

Mongolian teacher and writer

- Дамдинсүрэнгийн Алтангэрэл
- Born: 1945
- Died: 1998 (aged 52–53)
- Occupations: Teacher; Writer

Damdinsürengiin Altangerel (Note: Mongolian: Дамдинсүрэнгийн Алтангэрэл, romanized: Damdinsürengiin Altangerel) (1945 – 1998) was a Mongolian teacher and writer. He lived in the Mongolian capital of Ulaanbaatar, and taught English at the Mongolian University of Science and Technology.

Altangerel was the author of several English-Mongolian dictionaries, and published a collection of Mongolian folktales translated into English. He was married with two sons. In 1998 he died of liver cancer.

== Works ==
- A Modern Mongolian-English Dictionary: Cyrillic, 1998, ISBN 978-99929-2-100-5
