= Jamtsangiin Damdinsüren =

Mongolian politician

Jantsangiin Damdinsüren
- Жанцангийн Дамдинсүрэн
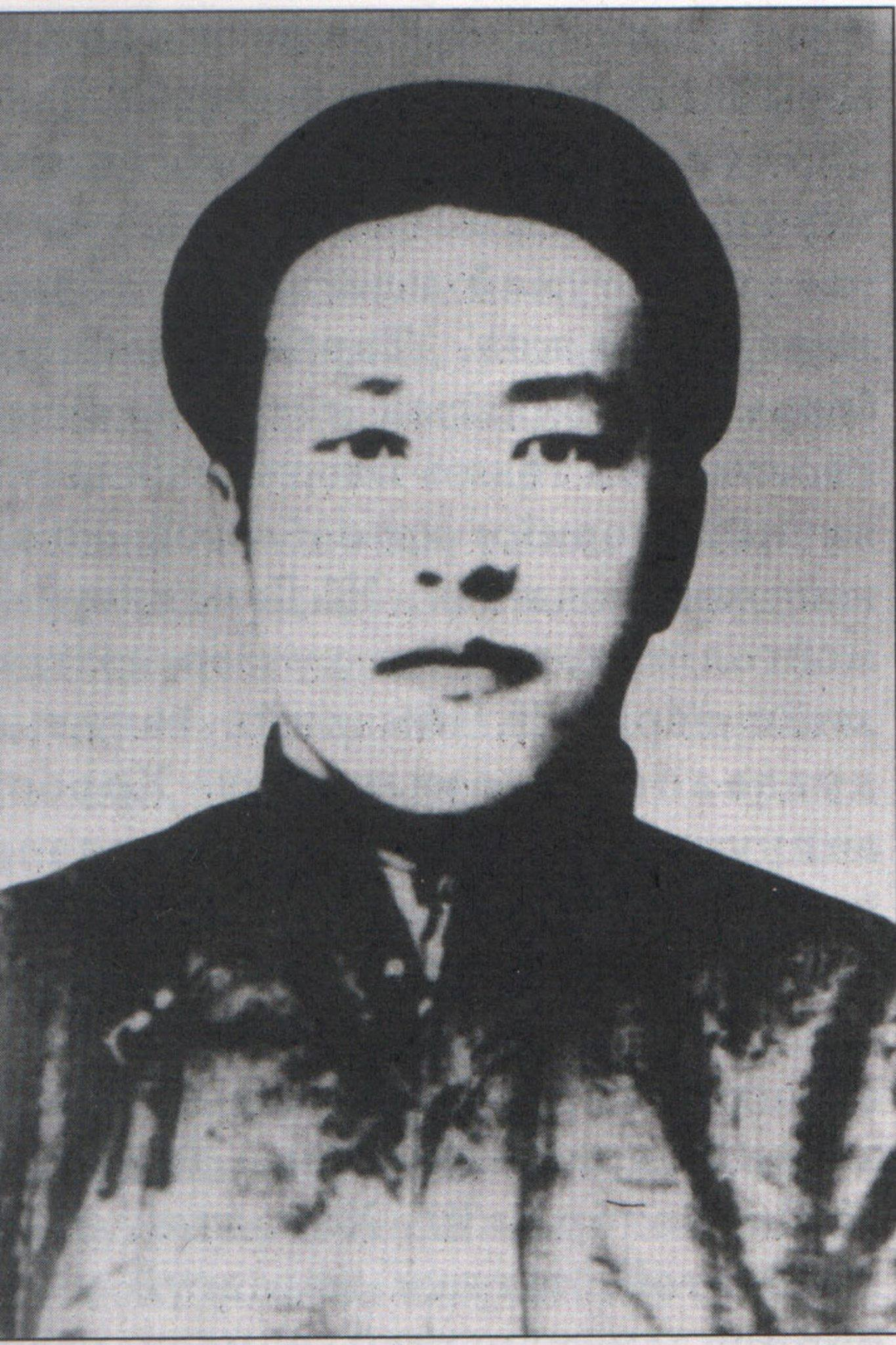

3rd Chairman of the Presidium of the State Little Khural
- In office January 16, 1927 – January 23, 1929
- Preceded by: Peljidiin Genden
- Succeeded by: Khorloogiin Choibalsan

Personal details
- Born: 1898 Zavkhan Province, Outer Mongolia, Qing China
- Died: 1938 (aged 39–40)
- Party: Mongolian People's Revolutionary Party (1923–1938)

Jantsangiin Damdinsüren (Mongolian: Жанцангийн Дамдинсурэн) (1898–1938) was a Mongolian politician, member of the Mongolian People's Revolutionary Party (MPRP) and titular head of state of Mongolia from the period of January 16, 1927 to January 23, 1929.

== Biography ==
Damdinsüren was born in Sain Noyon Khan Aimag (present day Zavkhan Province). As a young child he studied Tibetan language and classical Mongolian script. At age 16 he became a clerk in the local government. In 1923 he was appointed chief of staff of the new rural district in present-day Uliastai.

In 1925 he was elected as a delegate to the Fourth Congress of the Mongolian Revolutionary Youth League (MRYL). At this congress Damdinsuren was elected a member of the Presidium and head of the Central Committee of the MYRL. At the MPRP Fifth Congress he was elected member of the Great Hural which in turn elected him a member of the Small Khural. At the Sixth Party Congress in early 1927 he was re-elected Chairman of the MRYL and a member of the MPRP Central Committee. The Central Committee elected him as a member of the MPRP Presidium and he was then chosen as its Chairman, making him titular head of state of Mongolian People's Republic. Damdinsuren would hold this post from January 16, 1927 to January 23, 1929.

In 1928 the MPRP Seventh Party Congress ushered in the "Leftist Period" that signaled a more aggressive approach to implementation of Soviet backed leftist policies such as more rapid collectivization, land expropriation, and persecution of the Buddhist Church. Soviet advisers arranged for Damdinsüren to be replaced by the more pliable Khorloogiin Choibalsan, who was "kicked upstairs" to be Chairman of the Little Hural. Damdinsüren was in turn named deputy prime minister and minister of agriculture and then minister of animal husbandry. In 1930, he was relieved of his duties as member of the MPRP Presidium of the Central Committee during the Eight Party Congress and named head of the propaganda department of the Secretariat of the Central Committee. During the collectivization campaigns of 1930–1931, he returned to Zavkhan Province where he took up position as secretary of the commune and the director of a collective farm. From 1931 to 1934 he returned to Ulaanbaatar to work as General Secretary of Cooperatives, but then he returned again to Zavkhan to head the department of the local co-operative production. From 1934 to 1938 Damdinsüren was the second deputy chief of staff in Zavkhan Province and the head of the department of animal husbandry.

In 1938 Damdinsüren was accused of counterrevolutionary activity during Khorloogiin Choibalsan's Great Terror (1937-1939) and shortly thereafter he was executed.

He was rehabilitated in 1959.

Preceded by Peljidiin Genden	President of Mongolia; January 16, 1927 – January 23, 1929	Succeeded by Khorloogiin Choibalsan
