= List of de facto leaders of the Mongolian People's Republic =

List of de facto leaders of the MPR

Leader of the Mongolian People's Republic
- Бүгд Найрамдах Монгол Ард Улсын удирдагч
- Emblem of the MPRP and the MPR

- Flag of the Mongolian People's Republic

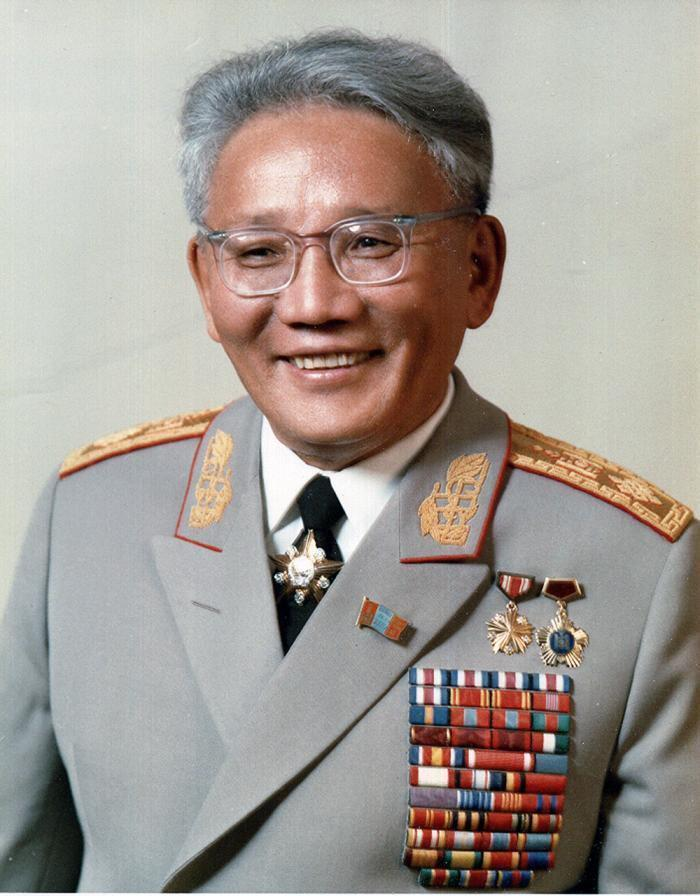
- Longest in role Yumjaagiin Tsedenbal; 22 November 1958–23 August 1984
- Type: De facto leader
- Status: Informal term for the most important political figure of the Mongolian People's Republic (Note: The de facto leader was not a formal position nor an office unto itself.)
- Formation: March 24, 1939; 87 years ago (Note: One source names 1928 (circa in October during the Seventh Party Congress of the MPRP), as the beginning of the de facto leadership, however 1939, is widely the accepted date.)
- First holder: Khorloogiin Choibalsan
- Final holder: Gombojavyn Ochirbat
- Abolished: March 23, 1990; 36 years ago (Note: On 2 May 1990, the constitution was amended again, some sources indicate that this was the end of a de facto leadership.)

The de facto leader of the Mongolian People's Republic or just simply Leader of the Mongolian People's Republic (Mongolian: Бүгд Найрамдах Монгол Ард Улсын удирдагч) was an informal term for the most powerful political figure in the Mongolian People's Republic between 1939 and 1990. During this period, the de facto leader was not always the titular head of government or head of state, but was often the General Secretary of the Mongolian People's Revolutionary Party.

== History ==
Following the People's Revolution of 1921, ideological and factional shifts occurred within the ruling Mongolian People's Party, later renamed the Mongolian People's Revolutionary Party (MPRP) in 1924. A decisive clash between leftists and rightists occurred at the 7th Party Congress from late October to December 1928. Consequently, multiple high-ranking conservative members, including party chairman Tseren-Ochiryn Dambadorj, were removed as left proponents gained control of the party and government. Following the expulsion of rightists, Khorloogiin Choibalsan became head of the State Little Khural (titular head of state). With strong backing from the Comintern and Joseph Stalin, policies of non-capitalist development were ratified in December 1928.

As part of the left course policies, confiscation of feudal property, the development of a five-year plan, and the forced collectivization were implemented nationwide. However, these measures lacked popular support by the general public, who were nomadic, largely illiterate, and remained obedient to traditional authorities. Despite opposition, the policies were accelerated following the 8th Party Congress in April 1930. Under the direction of Choibalsan, waves of repression came in 1929, 1931, and 1932, where confiscation of feudal estate were carried out. By 1931, more than one-third of the herder households had been forcibly communized.

Alongside collectivization, anti-religious campaigns, land confiscation, high taxes, nationalization of foreign and domestic trade led to the 1932 armed uprising by the buddhist clergy in Western Mongolia. Consequently, in May 1932, the Comintern and the Communist Party of the Soviet Union directed the MPRP to end its extremism. In the years after the uprising, the party rejected what it described "leftist deviation" and carried out the removal of top leftist leaders along with the reversal of collectivization. By 1939, Choibalsan, who became Marshal and internal affairs minister in 1936, consolidated absolute power and emerged as the premier after the unravelling of the Great Repression. However, he held no major positions within the party and remained so until his passing in 1952, a year before Stalin's death.

Choibalsan was succeeded as prime minister by Yumjaagiin Tsedenbal who became the General Secretary of the MPRP in 1940 and deputy premier in 1948. Tsedenbal remained a powerful figure in the Central Committee for over 25 years (with a brief struggle with Dashiin Damba between 1954 and 1958) until his removal by party cadres in 1984. Despite denouncing Choibalsan's cult of personality, Tsedenbal opposed rehabilitation and orchestrated removals of his own political opponents via internal exile. On 23 August 1984, Jambyn Batmönkh, premier since 1974, succeeded Tsedenbal as general secretary while Nyamyn Jagvaral assumed the role of acting head of the Presidium of the People's Great Khural (head of state). Following the reforms of Mikhail Gorbachev, similar efforts for restructuring were implemented in the 1980s. However, in late 1989 and early 1990, demonstrations against the one-party rule led to the Democratic Revolution of 1990. Party leader Batmönkh, who preferred peaceful transition, announced his resignation on 8 March 1990 via radio broadcast and was relieved from his duties on 14 March 1990 after an emergency Central Committee plenum. Gombojavyn Ochirbat was elected as party chairman to lead a reshuffled politburo on 14 March 1990. The MPRP's constitutional guarantee on power was removed by the People's Great Khural on 23 March 1990.

== List ==
Portrait	Name (Lifespan)	Period	Duration	Congress(es)	Premier(s)	President(s)	Policies
	Khorloogiin Choibalsan (1895–1952)	24 March 1939 (Note: One source names 1928 (circa in October during the Seventh Party Congress of the MPRP), as the beginning of the de facto leadership of Choibalsan, however 1939, is widely the accepted date.) ↓ 26 January 1952 †	12 years, 308 days	10th; 11th	Himself	Dansranbilegiin Dogsom; Gonchigiin Bumtsend	Stalinism: Gradualism (1932–1947); Great Repression (1937–1939); Central planning (Collective farming; Negdel) (1947–1952)
	Khorloogiin Choibalsan (1895–1952)	After the purge of his political rivals during the Great Repression, Choibalsan became the premier of the Mongolian People's Republic (MPR) in March 1939. As founding member of the MPRP, Choibalsan held numerous roles between 1928 and 1939 which enabled him to remove his opponents. He remained as premier during World War II and until his death in January 1952.					Stalinism: Gradualism (1932–1947); Great Repression (1937–1939); Central planning (Collective farming; Negdel) (1947–1952)
	Yumjaagiin Tsedenbal (Note: Some articles describe Tsedenbal as de facto leader between 1940 and 1952, however it's accepted that he was during the period, the "deputy" of the de facto leader rather than the de facto leader.) (1916–1991)	26 January 1952 ↓ 4 April 1954	2 years, 68 days	12th	Himself	Gonchigiin Bumtsend; Sükhbaataryn Yanjmaa	—
	Yumjaagiin Tsedenbal (1916–1991)	Following Choibalsan's death in 1952, Tsedenbal succeeded him as premier. Prior to 1952, Tsedenbal became the General Secretary of the newly established MPRP Central Committee on 8 April 1940.					—
	Collective leadership (Members: Yumjaagiin Tsedenbal (1916–1991) and Dashiin Damba (1908–1989))	4 April 1954 ↓ 22 November 1958	4 years, 232 days	—	Yumjaagiin Tsedenbal	Sükhbaataryn Yanjmaa; Jamsrangiin Sambuu	De-Stalinization: Collective leadership; Rehabilitations (1954–1955)
	Collective leadership (Members: Yumjaagiin Tsedenbal (1916–1991) and Dashiin Damba (1908–1989))	In April 1954, following the Soviet example, Dashiin Damba was elected as the First Secretary of the Central Committee while Tsedenbal remained as premier in a collective leadership. Re-evaluation of Choibalsan's purges and legacy in the mid-to-late 1950s led to split between Damba and Tsedenbal. Damba was replaced and internally exiled by Tsedenbal in 1958.					De-Stalinization: Collective leadership; Rehabilitations (1954–1955)
	Yumjaagiin Tsedenbal (1916–1991)	22 November 1958 ↓ 23 August 1984	25 years, 275 days	13th; 14th; 15th; 16th; 17th; 18th	Himself; Jambyn Batmönkh	Jamsrangiin Sambuu; Tsagaanlamyn Dügersüren; Sonomyn Luvsan; Himself	Socialist construction: Industrialization; Collectivization (Negdel); Sino-Soviet split (1956–1966)
	Yumjaagiin Tsedenbal (1916–1991)	With the removal of Damba, Tsedenbal secured his political control in 1958. Starting from the 1960s, Tsedenbal consolidated further power via "soft purge" of political opponents and intelligentsia. In 1974, Tsedenbal became head of state and leaved the post of premiership while retaining party leadership.					Socialist construction: Industrialization; Collectivization (Negdel); Sino-Soviet split (1956–1966)
	Jambyn Batmönkh (1926–1997)	23 August 1984 ↓ 14 March 1990	5 years, 203 days	19th	Himself; Dumaagiin Sodnom	Nyamyn Jagvaral; Himself	Restructuring: Democratization; Openness; Soviet withdrawal; Sino-Mongolian rapprochement
	Jambyn Batmönkh (1926–1997)	On 23 August 1984, Batmönkh, who served as premier since 1974, ousted Tsedenbal as General Secretary in a coup d'état. He was a pragmatic leader who embraced reforms. He served as general secretary and head of the Presidium until March 1990, when he and the entire politburo resigned in concession to the Mongolian opposition.					Restructuring: Democratization; Openness; Soviet withdrawal; Sino-Mongolian rapprochement
	Gombojavyn Ochirbat (born 1929)	14 March 1990 ↓ 23 March 1990 (Note: On 2 May 1990, the constitution was amended again, some sources indicate that this was the end of a de facto leadership.)	9 days	—	Dumaagiin Sodnom; Sharavyn Gungaadorj	Jambyn Batmönkh; Punsalmaagiin Ochirbat	Restructuring: Democratization; Openness; Soviet withdrawal; Sino-Mongolian rapprochement
	Gombojavyn Ochirbat (born 1929)	Following the Batmönkh's resignation, Ochirbat was elected General Secretary during the plenum of the Central Committee in 14 March 1990. Later on 23 March 1990, the constitutional clause allowing the MPRP's leading role in society was removed by the People's Great Khural, ending the almost 70-year one-party rule.					Restructuring: Democratization; Openness; Soviet withdrawal; Sino-Mongolian rapprochement

== See also ==
- List of premiers of the Mongolian People's Republic
- List of presidents of the Mongolian People's Republic

=== Other leaders of the Eastern Bloc ===
- List of leaders of the Soviet Union
- De facto leader of the GDR
- Paramount leader
- List of de facto leaders of the People's Republic of Kampuchea
- List of de facto leaders of the Polish People's Republic
- List of de facto rulers of the Czechoslovak Socialist Republic
- List of de facto leaders of the People's Republic of Bulgaria
- List of de facto leaders of Hungary (1945–1989)
- List of de facto leaders of the Socialist Republic of Romania
- List of de facto leaders of Communist Albania
