= List of de facto leaders of Communist Albania =

List of de facto leaders in the communist period of Albania

De facto leader of Albania

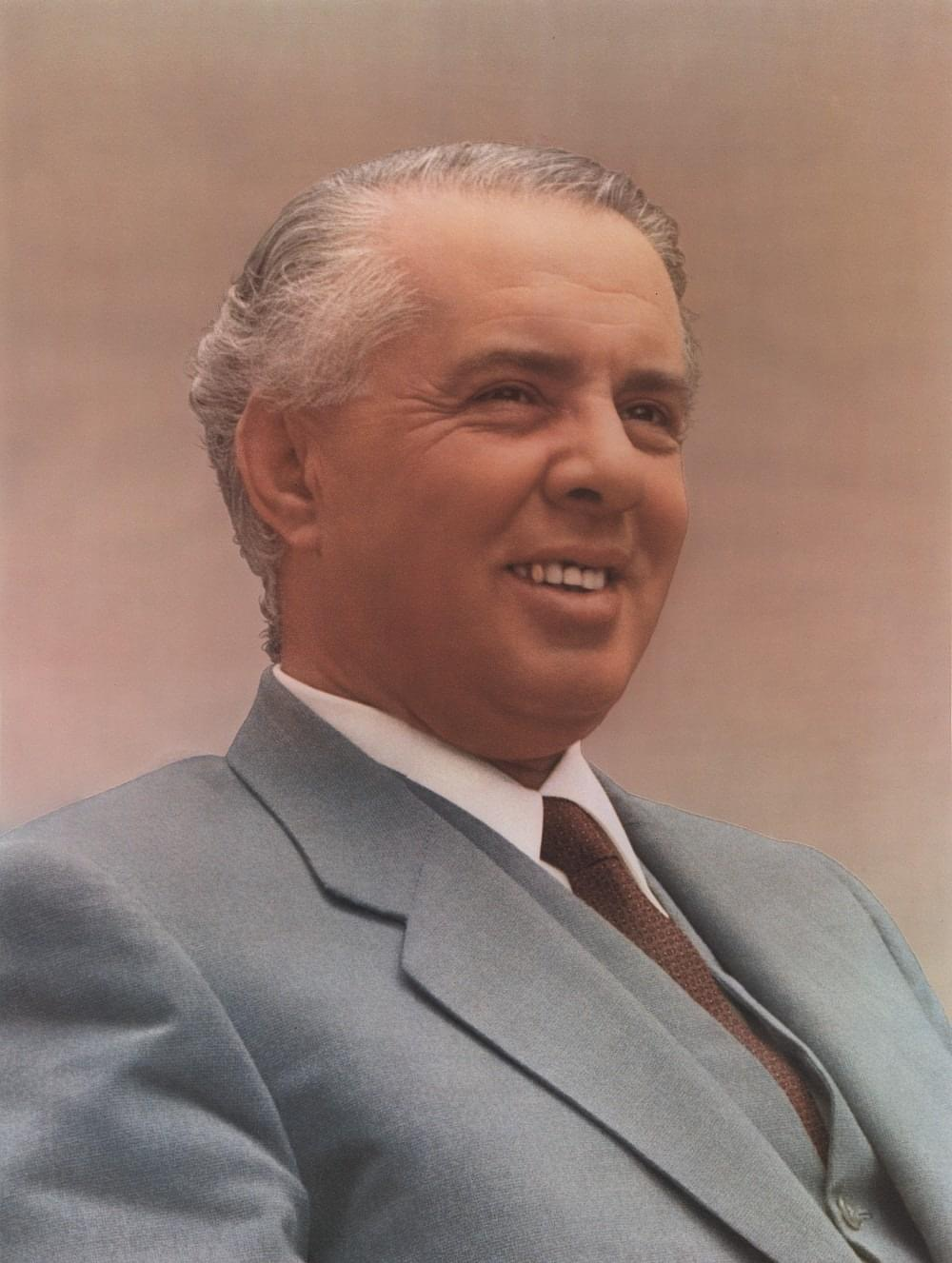
- Longest in role Enver Hoxha; 29 November 1944 – 11 April 1985
- Type: First Secretary of the Party of Labour of Albania (Party leader)
- Formation: November 29, 1944; 81 years ago
- First holder: Enver Hoxha
- Final holder: Ramiz Alia
- Abolished: December 11, 1990; 35 years ago
- Unofficial names: Supreme Leader

During the Communist era of Albania (Democratic Government of Albania and People's Republic of Albania/People's Socialist Republic of Albania), the state had a de facto leader which wasn't the head of state or head of government but the First Secretary of the Party of Labour of Albania. Until 11 December 1990, the Party of Labour of Albania, had a monopoly on power, as it followed the concept of the Leading role of the party.

== List ==
No.	Portrait	Name (Birth–Death)	Term of office			Party	References
No.	Portrait	Name (Birth–Death)	Took office	Left office	Time in office	Party	References
Democratic Government of Albania (1944–1946)
1		Enver Hoxha (1908–1985)	29 November 1944	10 January 1946	1 year, 42 days	Party of Labour of Albania	
People's Republic of Albania/People's Socialist Republic of Albania (1946–1991)
(1)		Enver Hoxha (1908–1985)	11 January 1946	11 April 1985	39 years, 90 days	Party of Labour of Albania	
2		Ramiz Alia (1925–2011)	11 April 1985	11 December 1990	5 years, 244 days	Party of Labour of Albania	

== See also ==
- List of leaders of the Soviet Union
- Paramount leader
- De facto leader of the GDR
- List of de facto leaders of the Polish People's Republic
- List of de facto rulers of the Czechoslovak Socialist Republic
- List of de facto leaders of the People's Republic of Bulgaria
- List of de facto leaders of Hungary (1945–1989)
- List of de facto leaders of the Socialist Republic of Romania
