= 1984 Mongolian coup d'état =

Ousting of Yumjaagiin Tsedenbal

- Part of the Cold War
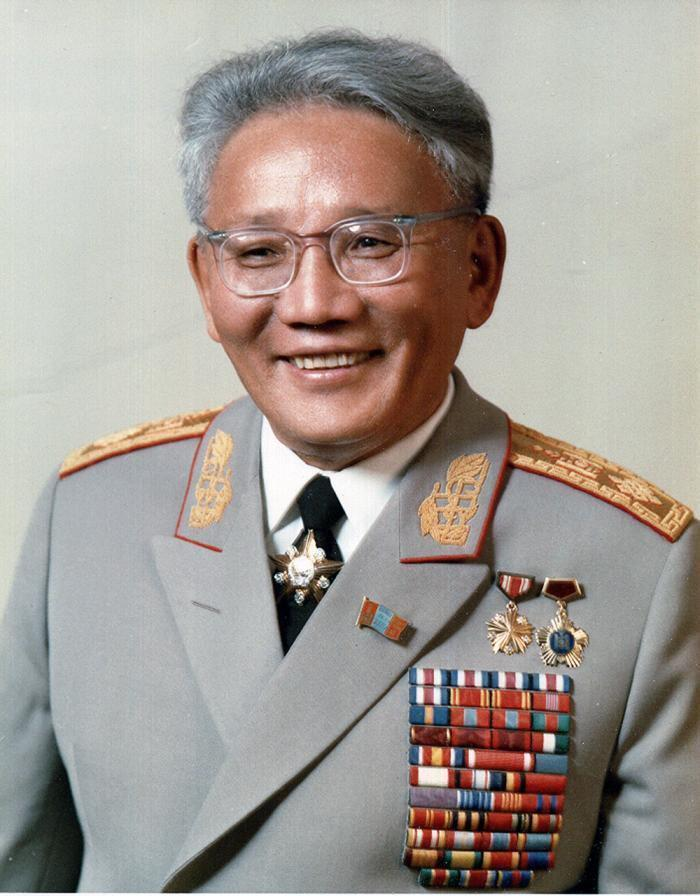
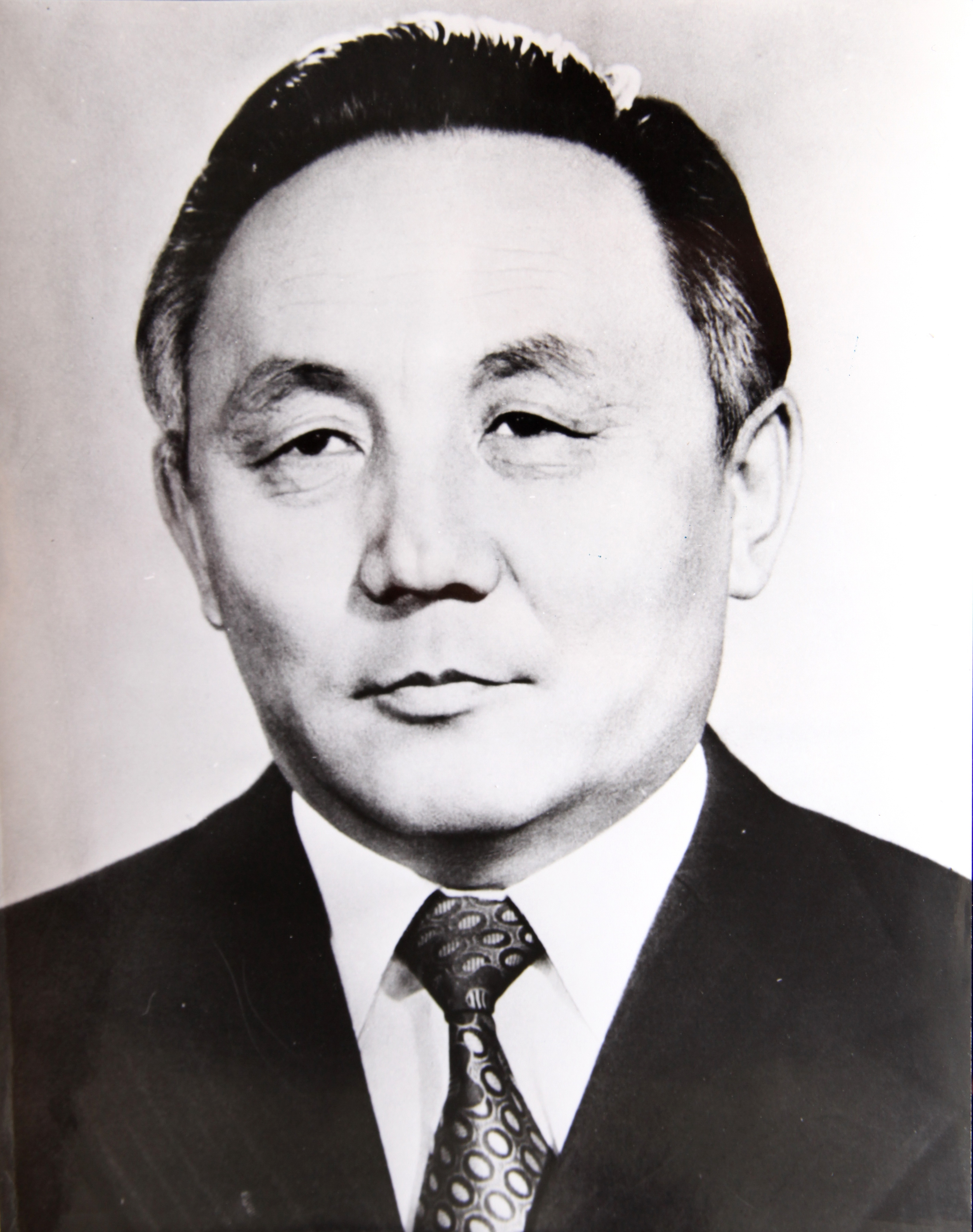
- Yumjaagiin Tsedenbal Jambyn Batmönkh Persons involved in the coup d'état
- Date: August 23, 1984
- Location: Mongolian People's Republic
- Target: Yumjaagiin Tsedenbal
- Participants: Jambyn Batmönkh
- Outcome: Jambyn Batmönkh becomes De facto leader of the MPR and General Secretary of the Central Committee of the MPRP; Nyamyn Jagvaral becomes the Acting Chairman of the Presidium of the People's Great Khural

On 23 August 1984, a coup d'état by the central committee of the ruling party ousted the ill Yumjaagiin Tsedenbal, who was the De facto leader of the MPR as General Secretary of the Central Committee of the MPRP and also served as the Chairman of the Presidium of the People's Great Khural.

== Background ==
After Brezhnev's death in 1982, the new Soviet leadership decided in November 1983 that Yumjaagiin Tsedenbal's erratic behaviour was becoming a liability. On 9 August 1984, while Tsedenbal was vacationing in Moscow, the Kremlin's doctor diagnosed him as suffering from "overwork", and top Soviet leaders summoned Jambyn Batmönkh and Tsedenbal's old ally Demchigjabyn Molomjamts, telling them Tsedenbal could no longer serve.

== Coup ==
The Central Committee of the Mongolian People's Revolutionary Party held a special plenum, in which an instruction by the Politburo moved a resolution, which was unanimously proposed by the Politburo, that Tsedenbal would be relieved of his duties; another resolution was that Jambyn Batmönkh would be elected as General Secretary of the Central Committee of the MPRP. Batmönkh supported the ousting of Tsedenbal. The plenum accepted both resolutions, and Tsedenbal was ousted. The reason named for his removal was his illness. While Batmönkh took over the office of general secretary and became with it the de facto leader, Nyamyn Jagvaral became the Acting Chairman of the Presidium of the People's Great Khural. Also during the plenum, the Secretary of the Central Committee, Tserendashiyn Namsray, became a full member of the Politburo. During his removal Tsedenbal was in Moscow.

== Aftermath ==
The party, during its special plenum and the People's Great Khural, announced Yumjaagiin Tsedenbal's "retirement". The first reports about his removal came out still the same day, while many other newspapers reported his removal one day later.

Two months later, Jambyn Batmönkh who advocated for pragmatist reforms met with Soviet leader Konstantin Chernenko, which marked his first trip to Moscow, Soviet Union.

== See also ==
- Removal of Pen Sovann
