= Party secretary =

Political office

In politics, a party secretary is a senior official within a political party with responsibility for the organizational and daily political work. In most parties, the party secretary is second in rank to the party leader (or party chair). In some parties, especially communist parties, the General Secretary is the leader.

There can be party secretaries at various levels of a political party. For example, city-level branches of a communist party may be structured with party secretaries as their leaders. At every level of government in the Chinese Communist Party, the Party committee is the leading political institution, with its Secretary (also known as the Party Secretary) serving as the most senior official at that level. At the provincial level, the secretary of the provincial Party committee outranks the provincial governor. At the city level, the secretary of the municipal Party committee outranks the mayor. The Chinese Community Party also has village party secretaries who are leaders in their communities.

== Party secretary positions ==
- (China) Chinese Communist Party Committee Secretary
- (North Korea) Korean Workers' Party Committee Secretary
- (Vietnam) Vietnamese Communist Party Committee Secretary
- (Laos) Lao People's Revolutionary Party Committee Secretary
- (Cuba) Cuban Communist Party Committee Secretary
- (Soviet Union) Soviet Communist Party Committee Secretary

== See also ==
- Secretary
- Secretary of state
- Secretariat (administrative office)
