= List of heads of state of Mongolia =

The Constitution of Mongolia adopted in 1992 states that the President of Mongolia is the "head of state and embodiment of the unity of the Mongolian people".

Mongolia declared its independence from the Qing dynasty during the Mongolian Revolution of 1911, (Note: Outer Mongolia was under military occupation of the Republic of China (ROC) from October 1919 to March 1921. It remained de jure part of the ROC (as the Mongolia Area) until 5 January 1946, when the ROC officially recognized its de facto independence (following the referendum held on 20 October 1945).) under the Bogd Khan (the 8th Jebtsundamba Khutuktu). From 1911 to 1924, during the Bogd Khanate of Mongolia, the head of state of Mongolia was nominally the Bogd Khan. During 1924 to 1992, during the Mongolian People's Republic, the official title of the head of state underwent several changes, namely:

- Chairman of the State Great Khural (1924)
- Chairman of the Presidium of the State Little Khural (1924–1951)
- Chairman of the Presidium of the State Great Khural (1951–1960)
- Chairman of the Presidium of the People's Great Khural (1960–1990)
- President of the Mongolian People's Republic (1990–1992)

== Heads of state of Mongolia (1911–present) ==
† denotes people who died in office.

(Dates in italics indicate de facto continuation of office)

=== Bogd Khanate of Mongolia (1911–1919, 1921–1924) and People's Provisional Government (1921) ===
Khagan of Mongolia
No.	Portrait	Name Religious title (Birth–Death)	Reign			Imperial Seal
No.	Portrait	Name Religious title (Birth–Death)	Reign start	Reign end	Duration	Imperial Seal
1		Bogd Khan; The 8th Jebtsundamba Khutuktu (1869–1924)	29 December 1911	20 May 1924 #	12 years, 143 days	

Acting Head of State
No.	Portrait	Name (Birth–Death)	Term of office			Political party
No.	Portrait	Name (Birth–Death)	Took office	Left office	Time in office	Political party
–		Balingiin Tserendorj (1868–1928); Acting	20 May 1924	26 November 1924	190 days	MPRP

=== Mongolian People's Republic (1924–1992) ===
Colour key (for political parties):

Mongolian People's Revolutionary Party (16)

No.	Portrait	Name (Birth–Death)	Term of office			Political party
No.	Portrait	Name (Birth–Death)	Took office	Left office	Time in office	Political party
Office not established (26 – 28 November 1924)
Chairman of the State Great Khural
1		Navaandorjiin Jadambaa (1900–1939)	28 November 1924	29 November 1924	1 day	MPRP
Chairman of the Presidium of the State Little Khural
2		Peljidiin Genden (1892–1937)	29 November 1924	15 November 1927	2 years, 351 days	MPRP
3		Jamtsangiin Damdinsüren (1898–1938)	16 November 1927	23 January 1929	1 year, 68 days	MPRP
4		Khorloogiin Choibalsan (1895–1952)	24 January 1929	27 April 1930	1 year, 93 days	MPRP
5		Losolyn Laagan (1887–1940)	27 April 1930	2 July 1932	2 years, 66 days	MPRP
6		Anandyn Amar (1886–1941)	2 July 1932	22 March 1936	3 years, 264 days	MPRP
7		Dansranbilegiin Dogsom (1884–1941)	22 March 1936	9 July 1939	3 years, 109 days	MPRP
Vacant (9 July 1939 – 6 July 1940)
8		Gonchigiin Bumtsend (1881–1953)	6 July 1940	6 July 1951	11 years	MPRP
Chairman of the Presidium of the State Great Khural
(8)		Gonchigiin Bumtsend (1881–1953)	6 July 1951	23 September 1953 #	2 years, 79 days	MPRP
–		Sükhbaataryn Yanjmaa (1893–1962); Acting	23 September 1953	7 July 1954	287 days	MPRP
9		Jamsrangiin Sambuu (1895–1972)	7 July 1954	7 July 1960	6 years	MPRP
Chairman of the Presidium of the People's Great Khural
(9)		Jamsrangiin Sambuu (1895–1972)	7 July 1960	21 May 1972 #	11 years, 319 days	MPRP
–		Tsagaanlamyn Dügersüren (1914–1986); Acting	21 May 1972	29 June 1972	39 days	MPRP
–		Sonomyn Luvsan (1912–1994); Acting	29 June 1972	11 June 1974	1 year, 317 days	MPRP
10		Yumjaagiin Tsedenbal (1916–1991)	11 June 1974	23 August 1984 (Ousted)	10 years, 73 days	MPRP
–		Nyamyn Jagvaral (1919–1987); Acting	23 August 1984	12 December 1984	111 days	MPRP
11		Jambyn Batmönkh (1926–1997)	12 December 1984	21 March 1990	5 years, 99 days	MPRP
12		Punsalmaagiin Ochirbat (1942–2025)	21 March 1990	3 September 1990	166 days	MPRP
President of the Mongolian People's Republic
(12)		Punsalmaagiin Ochirbat (1942–2025)	3 September 1990	12 February 1992	1 year, 162 days	MPRP

=== Mongolia (1992–present) ===
Colour key (for political parties):

Mongolian People's Revolutionary Party / Mongolian People's Party (3)
Democratic Union Coalition / Democratic Party (3)

No.	Portrait	Name (Birth–Death)	Election	Term of office			Political party
No.	Portrait	Name (Birth–Death)	Election	Took office	Left office	Time in office	Political party
President of Mongolia
1		Punsalmaagiin Ochirbat (1942–2025)	—	12 February 1992	20 June 1997	5 years, 128 days	MPRP (until June 1993)
1		Punsalmaagiin Ochirbat (1942–2025)	1993	12 February 1992	20 June 1997	5 years, 128 days	DUC
2		Natsagiin Bagabandi (born 1950)	1997; 2001	20 June 1997	24 June 2005	8 years, 4 days	MPRP
3		Nambaryn Enkhbayar (born 1958)	2005	24 June 2005	18 June 2009	3 years, 359 days	MPRP
4		Tsakhiagiin Elbegdorj (born 1963)	2009; 2013	18 June 2009	10 July 2017	8 years, 22 days	Democratic
5		Khaltmaagiin Battulga (born 1963)	2017	10 July 2017	25 June 2021	3 years, 350 days	Democratic
6		Ukhnaagiin Khürelsükh (born 1968)	2021	25 June 2021	19 November 2026 (Resigned)	5 years, 147 days	MPP
–		Sandagiin Byambatsogt (born 1974); Acting	—	19 November 2026	Incumbent	3 days	MPP

== See also ==
- List of Mongol rulers
- President of Mongolia
- Prime Minister of Mongolia
  - List of prime ministers of Mongolia
- Chairman of the State Great Khural
  - List of chairmen of the State Great Khural
- List of de facto leaders of the Mongolian People's Republic
