= General Secretary of the Communist Party =

Leader of a communist party; de facto leader of one-party communist states

The title of General Secretary or First Secretary is commonly used for the leaders of most communist parties. When a communist party is the ruling party of a communist state, the general secretary is typically the country's de facto leader. Except in Vietnam, it is not uncommon for this leader to also assume state-level positions, such as president or premiership, thereby also becoming the de jure leader of the state. The position of general secretary is typically elected by the communist party's central committee (with the Workers' Party of Korea as an exception), and the holder of this title also serves on the communist party's politburo and secretariat.

== General secretaries of ruling communist parties ==
Leaders of current ruling communist parties
| Party | Title | Officeholder | Took office | Length of tenure | Ref. |
|---|---|---|---|---|---|
| Workers' Party of Korea | General Secretary | Kim Jong Un | 11 April 2012 | 14 years, 216 days | |
| Chinese Communist Party | General Secretary of the Central Committee | Xi Jinping | 15 November 2012 | 13 years, 363 days | |
| Lao People's Revolutionary Party | General Secretary of the Central Committee | Thongloun Sisoulith | 15 January 2021 | 5 years, 302 days | |
| Communist Party of Cuba | First Secretary of the Central Committee | Miguel Díaz-Canel | 19 April 2021 | 5 years, 208 days | |
| Communist Party of Vietnam | General Secretary of the Central Committee | Tô Lâm | 3 August 2024 | 2 years, 102 days | |

== General secretaries of former ruling communist parties ==
General Secretaries of former ruling communist parties
| Party | Title | Country | First officeholder | Term began and ended | Final officeholder | Term began and ended |
|---|---|---|---|---|---|---|
| Party of Labour of Albania | General Secretary | People's Socialist Republic of Albania | Enver Hoxha | 38 November 1941 – 11 April 1985 | Ramiz Alia | 13 April 1985 – 13 June 1991 |
| Bulgarian Communist Party | General Secretary | People's Republic of Bulgaria | Georgi Dimitrov | 1933 – 2 July 1949 | Petar Mladenov | 10 November 1989 – 2 February 1990 |
| Communist Party of Czechoslovakia | First Secretary | Czechoslovakia | Klement Gottwald | 1945 – 14 March 1953 | Ladislav Adamec | 21 December 1989 – 1 September 1990 |
| Socialist Unity Party of Germany | General Secretary | East Germany | Wilhelm Pieck | 22 April 1946 – 25 July 1950 (as Chairman) | Egon Krenz | 18 October 1989 – 3 December 1989 |
| Hungarian Socialist Workers' Party (Note: Successor of the Hungarian Working People's Party from 1956) | General Secretary | Hungarian People's Republic | János Kádár | 25 October 1956 – 22 May 1988 | Rezső Nyers | 22 May 1988 – 7 October 1989 (as President) |
| Communist Party of Kampuchea | General Secretary | Democratic Kampuchea | Tou Samouth | 30 September 1960 – 20 July 1962 | Pol Pot | 22 February 1963 – 6 December 1981 |
| Mongolian People's Revolutionary Party (Note: Following the Mongolian Revolution of 1990, the party became the current Mongolian People's Party) | General Secretary | Mongolian People's Republic | Soliin Danzan | 3 March 1921 – 21 September 1921 | Büdragchaagiin Dash-Yondon | 28 February 1991 – 28 July 1996 (as Chairman till 1992) (Note: Dash-Yondon was the last leader of the party before the dissolution of the Mongolian People's Republic) |
| Polish United Workers' Party | First Secretary | Polish People's Republic | Bolesław Bierut | 22 December 1948 – 12 March 1956 | Mieczysław Rakowski | 29 July 1989 – 29 January 1990 |
| Romanian Communist Party | General Secretary | Socialist Republic of Romania | Gheorghe Gheorghiu-Dej | 16 October 1945 – 19 April 1954 and 30 September 1955 – 19 March 1965 | Nicolae Ceaușescu | 22 March 1965 – 22 December 1989 |
| Communist Party of the Soviet Union | General Secretary | Union of Soviet Socialist Republics | Joseph Stalin | 3 April 1922 – 16 October 1952 | Vladimir Ivashko | 24 August 1991 – 29 August 1991 (acting) |
| League of Communists of Yugoslavia | President | Socialist Federal Republic of Yugoslavia | Josip Broz Tito | March 1939 – 4 May 1980 | Milan Pančevski | 8 May 1989 – 30 June 1990 |

== See also ==
- General secretary
- Central committee
- Politburo
- Secretariat
