= Sonomyn Luvsan =

Mongolian politician (1912–1994)

- Сономын Лувсан
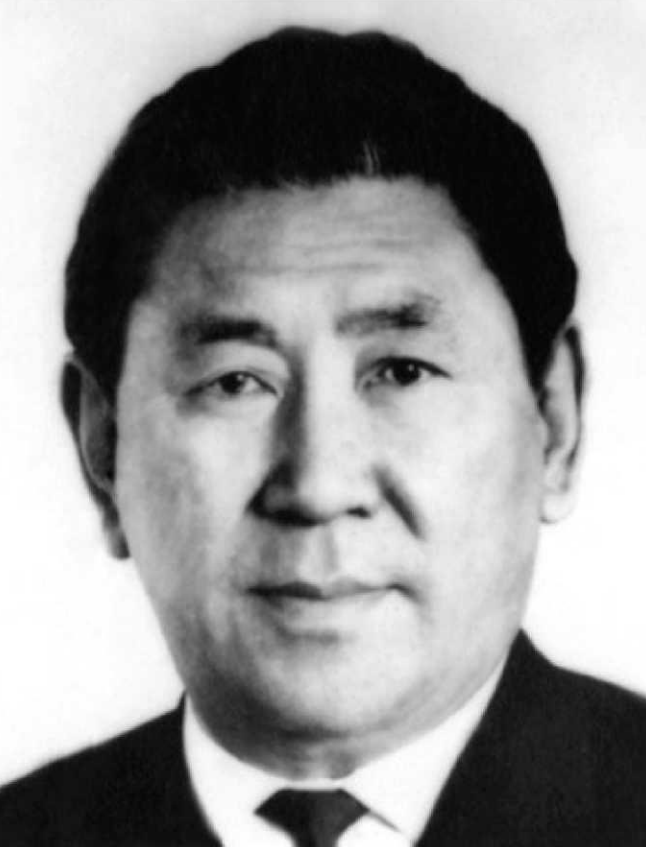

Chairman of the Presidium of the State Little Khural
- Acting
- In office June 29, 1972 – June 11, 1974
- Preceded by: Tsagaanlamyn Dügersüren (acting)
- Succeeded by: Yumjaagiin Tsedenbal

Personal details
- Born: 1912
- Died: 1994 (aged 81–82)

Sonomyn Luvsan (Mongolian: Сономын Лувсан; 1912–1994) was a Mongolian politician and diplomat who was acting Chairman of the Presidium of the People's Great Khural of the Mongolian People's Republic from 1972 to 1974.

== Career ==
Luvsan was Minister of Finance from 1940 to 1941. During World War II he served as deputy premier under Khorloogiin Choibalsan.

Luvsan was appointed to the politburo of the Mongolian People's Party in 1963.

Mao Zedong said in July 1964, that Siberia and the far east once belonged to China, but was taken by the Russian Empire; Foreign Minister Chen Yi told Luvsan that Japanese and western newspapers misrepresented Mao's comments and that China did not want to seize territory. Luvsan went to China in October 1964 seeking economic assistance, but Zhou Enlai declined the request. He led a Mongolia delegation to participate in celebrations of the 15th anniversary of the founding of the People's Republic of China.

Luvsan served as first vice premier from 1963 to 1972. Two days after his removal as first vice-premier he was elected as first vice president, a newly created position. He was chair of the Central Council of the Mongol-Soviet Friendship Society, which had 200,000 members.

Jamsrangiin Sambuu, chair of the People's Great Khural, died in 1972, and nobody was officially selected to replace him for two years. Yumjaagiin Tsedenbal resigned as chair of the Council of Ministers and was unanimously elected chair after being nominated by Luvsan.

Luvsan served as Mongolia's ambassador to China from 1957 to 1959, He was the ambassador to the Soviet Union from 1960 to 1963. In 1976, Luvsan was appointed as ambassador to Algeria.

== Works cited ==
- Radchenko, Sergey (2007). "New Documents on Mongolia and the Cold War" (PDF). Cold War International History Project Bulletin (16). Wilson Center: 341–446.
- Radchenko, Sergey (2006). "Mongolian Politics in the Shadow of the Cold War: The 1964 Coup Attempt and the Sino-Soviet Split". Journal of Cold War Studies. 8 (1). MIT Press: 95–119. doi:10.2307/26925888. JSTOR 26925888.
- Rupen, Robert (1964). "Recent Trends in the Mongolian People's Republic". Asian Survey. 4 (4). University of California Press: 812–820. doi:10.2307/3023418. JSTOR 3023418.
- Sanders, Alan (1977). "Mongolia 1976: Drawing Together Frankly with the Soviet Union". Asian Survey. 17 (1). University of California Press: 27–33. doi:10.2307/2643437. JSTOR 2643437.
- Sanders, Alan (1974). "Mongolia: From Sambuu to Tsedenbal". Asian Survey. 14 (11). University of California Press: 971–984. doi:10.2307/2643508. JSTOR 2643508.

Political offices
Preceded by Tsagaanlamyn Dügersüren (acting)	President of Mongolia (acting); June 29, 1972 – June 11, 1974	Succeeded by Yumjaagiin Tsedenbal
