= List of de facto leaders of Hungary (1945–1989) =

List of de facto leaders of Hungary between 1945 and 1989

De facto leader of Hungary
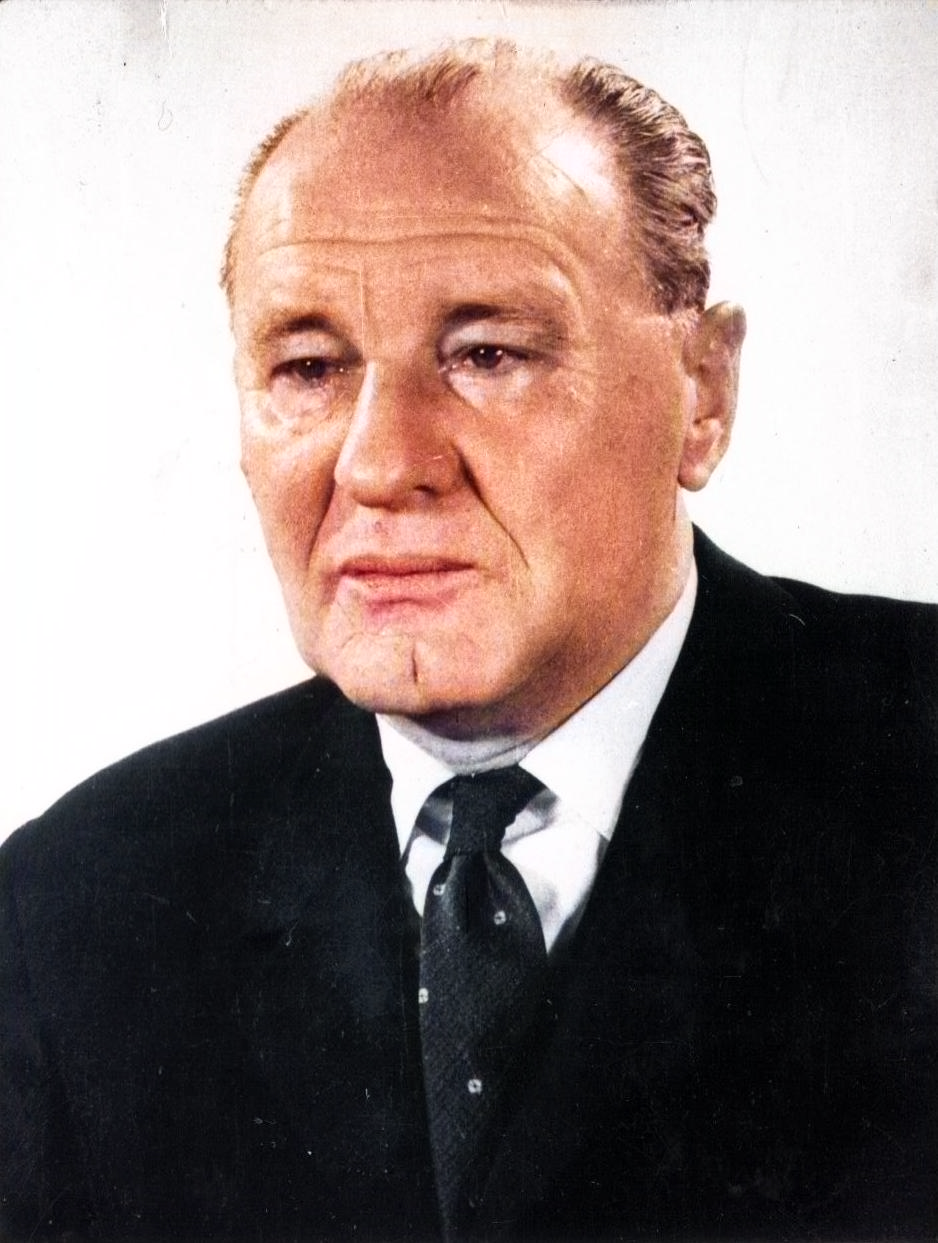
- Longest in role János Kádár; 4 November 1956 – 22 May 1988
- Status: Informal term for the most important political figure of Hungary between 1945 and 1989 (Note: The de facto leader of Hungary wasn't a formal position nor an office unto itself.)
- Formation: c. 23 February 1945
- First holder: Mátyás Rákosi
- Final holder: Rezső Nyers
- Abolished: c. 7 October 1989

The de facto leader of Hungary was an informal term for the most important political figure of Hungary between 1945 and 1989. During this period all de facto leaders were members of communist parties. Between 1949 and 1989, Hungary then the Hungarian People's Republic was a communist state in which the two ruling parties; Hungarian Working People's Party (1949–1956) and Hungarian Socialist Workers' Party (1956–1989) had a monopoly on power. Besides that the monopoly on power ended on 11 February 1989 or 20 February 1989, the HSWP had control over Hungary until 7 October 1989, when the party was dissolved and replaced.

== List ==
No.	Portrait	Name (Birth–Death)	Term of office			Party	References
No.	Portrait	Name (Birth–Death)	Took office	Left office	Time in office	Party	References
Hungarian State (1945–1946)
Under Soviet occupation (1945–1946)
1		Mátyás Rákosi (1892–1971)	c. 23 February 1945	1 February 1946	c. 343 days	Communist Party of Hungary	
Hungarian Republic (1946–1949)
Under Soviet occupation (1946–1947)
(1)		Mátyás Rákosi (1892–1971)	1 February 1946	20 August 1949	3 years, 200 days	Communist Party of Hungary Hungarian Working People's Party	
Hungarian People's Republic (1949–1989)
Under Soviet occupation (1956–1957)
(1)		Mátyás Rákosi (1892–1971)	20 August 1949	18 July 1956	6 years, 333 days	Hungarian Working People's Party	
2		Ernő Gerő (1898–1980)	18 July 1956	25 October 1956	99 days	Hungarian Working People's Party	
None; Imre Nagy was the de jure leader of the Hungarian People's Republic as Chairman of Council of Ministers (25 October 1956 – 4 November 1956)
3		János Kádár (1912–1989)	4 November 1956	22 May 1988	31 years, 200 days	Hungarian Socialist Workers' Party	
4		Károly Grósz (1930–1996)	22 May 1988	24 June 1989	1 year, 33 days	Hungarian Socialist Workers' Party	
5		Rezső Nyers (1923–2018)	24 June 1989	c. 7 October 1989	c. 105 days	Hungarian Socialist Workers' Party	

== See also ==
- List of leaders of the Soviet Union
- List of de facto leaders of the People's Republic of Bulgaria
- List of de facto leaders of the Socialist Republic of Romania
- List of de facto leaders of the Polish People's Republic
- List of de facto rulers of the Czechoslovak Socialist Republic
- De facto leader of the GDR
- List of de facto leaders of the Mongolian People's Republic
- List of de facto leaders of the People's Republic of Kampuchea
