= List of de facto rulers of the Czechoslovak Socialist Republic =

List of de facto rulers of the ČSSR

De facto ruler of the Czechoslovak Republic De facto ruler of the Czechoslovak Socialist Republic
- Emblem of the Communist Party of Czechoslovakia and the Coat of arms of the Czechoslovak Socialist Republic

- Flag of the Communist Party of Czechoslovakia and the flag of the Czechoslovak Socialist Republic

- Longest in role Gustáv Husák; 17 April 1969 – 17 December 1987
- Type: General Secretary of the Communist Party of Czechoslovakia (Party leader)
- Status: Informal term for the most important political figure of the Czechoslovak Socialist Republic (Note: The de facto leader was not a formal position nor an office unto itself.)
- Formation: 25 February 1948
- First holder: Klement Gottwald
- Final holder: Karel Urbánek
- Abolished: 29 November 1989

During the Czechoslovak Socialist Republic, the Chairman/General Secretary/First Secretary of the Communist Party of Czechoslovakia, was besides the status of party leader also the de facto ruler of the country.

== List ==
No.	Portrait	Name (Birth–Death)	Term of office			Party	References
No.	Portrait	Name (Birth–Death)	Took office	Left office	Time in office	Party	References
1		Klement Gottwald (1896–1953)	25 February 1948	14 March 1953	5 years, 17 days	Communist Party of Czechoslovakia	
Vacancy of the office of the Chairman of the Communist Party of Czechoslovakia (Note: The party accepted the concept of a collective leadership at the time.) (14 March 1953 – 13 September 1953)
2		Antonín Novotný (1904–1975)	13 September 1953	5 January 1968	14 years, 114 days	Communist Party of Czechoslovakia	
3		Alexander Dubček (1921–1992)	5 January 1968	17 April 1969	1 year, 102 days	Communist Party of Czechoslovakia	
4		Gustáv Husák (1913 –1991)	17 April 1969	17 December 1987	18 years, 244 days	Communist Party of Czechoslovakia	
5		Miloš Jakeš (1922–2020)	17 December 1987	24 November 1989	1 year, 342 days	Communist Party of Czechoslovakia	
6		Karel Urbánek (born 1941)	24 November 1989	29 November 1989	5 days	Communist Party of Czechoslovakia	

== See also ==
- List of heads of the Czech state
- List of de facto leaders of the Polish People's Republic
- De facto leader of the GDR
- List of leaders of the Soviet Union
- List of de facto leaders of the Mongolian People's Republic
- List of de facto leaders of the People's Republic of Kampuchea
- List of de facto leaders of the People's Republic of Bulgaria
- List of de facto leaders of Hungary (1945–1989)
- List of de facto leaders of the Socialist Republic of Romania
- Paramount leader
