= List of de facto leaders of the Polish People's Republic =

List of the de facto leaders of the PPR

De facto leader of the Polish People's Republic
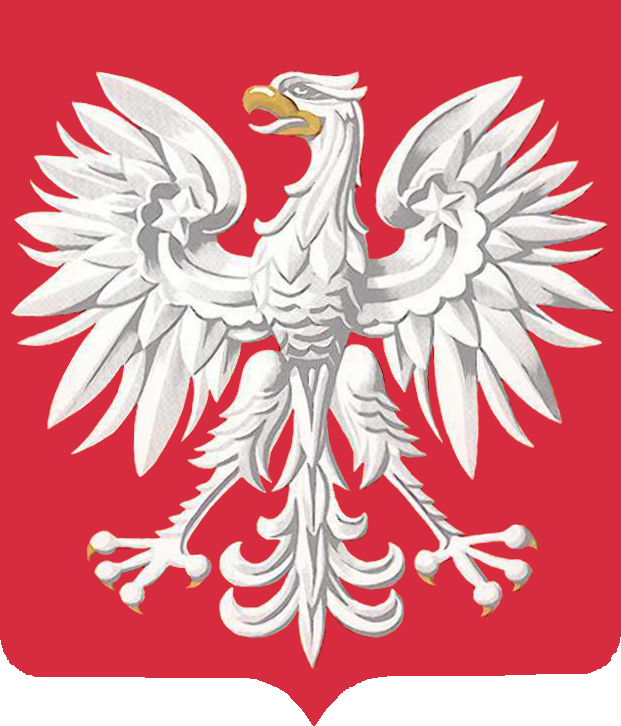
- Logo of the Polish United Workers' Party and the Coat of arms of the Polish People's Republic

- Flags of the Polish People's Republic

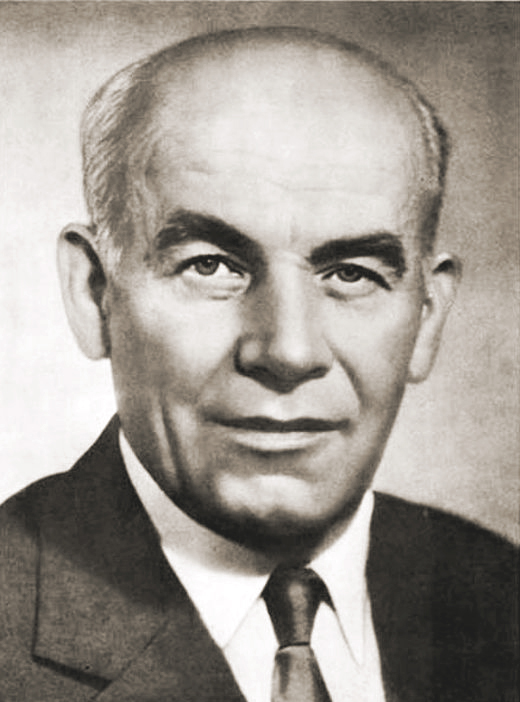
- Longest in role Władysław Gomułka; 21 October 1956 – 20 December 1970
- Status: Informal term for the most important political figure of the Polish People's Republic (Note: The de facto leader was not a formal position nor an office unto itself.)
- Formation: 1947 (first time) 22 December 1948 (second time)
- First holder: Jakub Berman
- Final holder: Wojciech Jaruzelski
- Abolished: 1947 (first time) 19 July 1989 (second time)
- Unofficial names: Nation's top leader
- Deputy: Second in Command

The de facto leader of the Polish People's Republic was an informal term for the most powerful political figure in the PPR in 1947 and between 1948 and 1989. During this period the de facto leader was not always the titular head of government or head of state, but was often the General Secretary of the Polish United Workers' Party.

== List ==
No.	Portrait	Name (Birth–Death)	Term of office			Party	References
No.	Portrait	Name (Birth–Death)	Took office	Left office	Time in office	Party	References
1		Jakub Berman (1901–1984)	1947	c. 5 February 1947	c. 35 days	Polish Workers' Party	
None; Bolesław Bierut was the de jure leader of the Polish People's Republic as President (c. 5 February 1947 – 22 December 1948)
2		Bolesław Bierut (1892–1956)	22 December 1948	12 March 1956	7 years, 81 days	Polish United Workers' Party	
Vacancy of the office of the General Secretary of the Polish United Workers' Party (12 March 1956 – 20 March 1956)
3		Edward Ochab (1906–1989)	20 March 1956	21 October 1956	215 days	Polish United Workers' Party	
4		Władysław Gomułka (1905–1982)	21 October 1956	20 December 1970	14 years, 60 days	Polish United Workers' Party (Endokomuna)	
5		Edward Gierek (1913–2001)	20 December 1970	6 September 1980	9 years, 261 days	Polish United Workers' Party	
6		Stanisław Kania (1927–2020)	6 September 1980	18 October 1981	1 year, 42 days	Polish United Workers' Party	
7		Wojciech Jaruzelski (1923–2014)	18 October 1981	19 July 1989	7 years, 274 days	Polish United Workers' Party	

== See also ==
- List of leaders of the Soviet Union
- List of de facto rulers of the Czechoslovak Socialist Republic
- List of de facto leaders of Hungary (1945–1989)
- List of de facto leaders of the People's Republic of Bulgaria
- List of de facto leaders of the Socialist Republic of Romania
- De facto leader of the GDR
- List of de facto leaders of the Mongolian People's Republic
- List of de facto leaders of the People's Republic of Kampuchea
- Paramount leader
