= Jambyn Batmönkh =

Mongolian politician (1926–1997)

- Жамбын Батмөнх
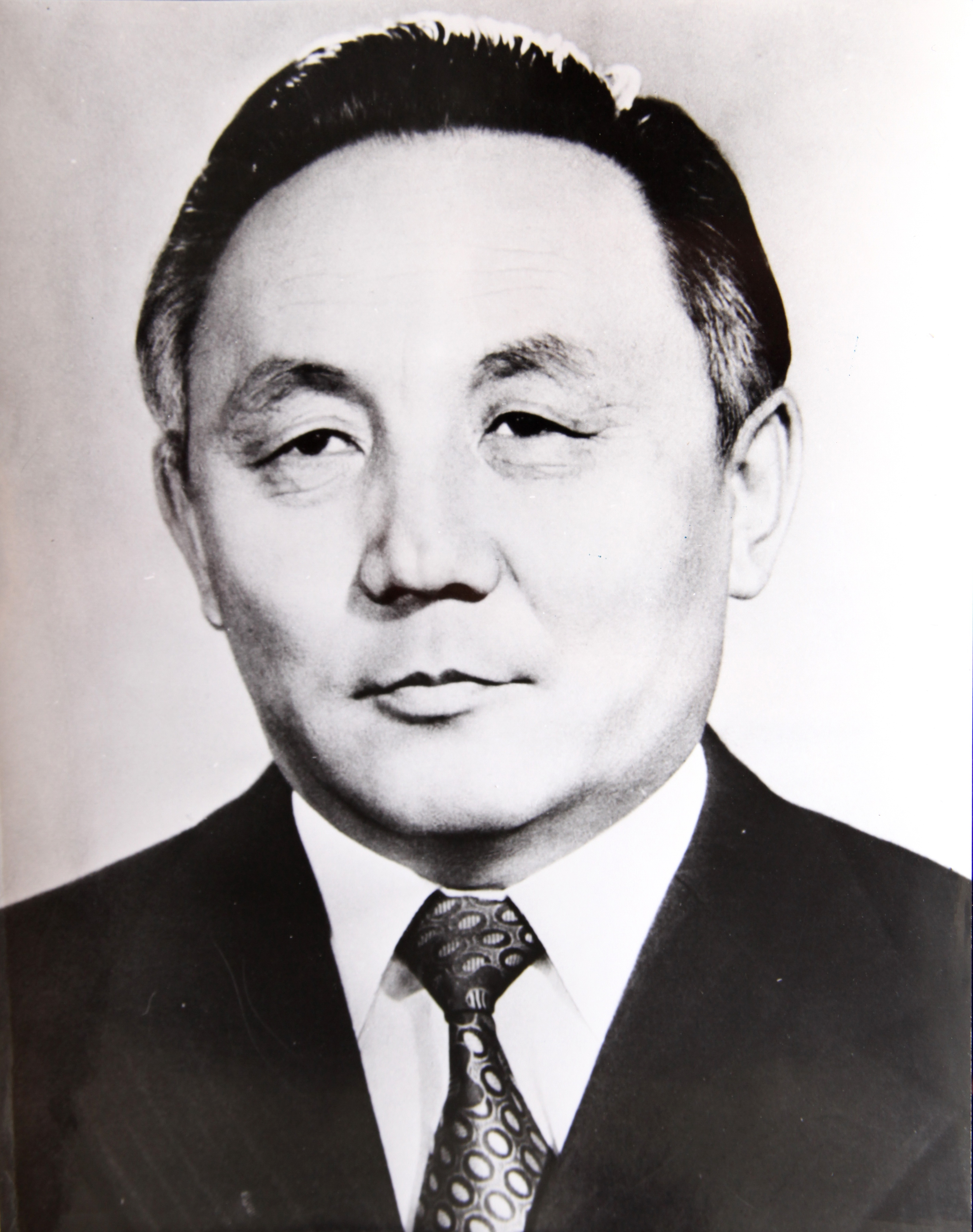
- Batmönkh in the late 1980s

General Secretary of the Mongolian People's Revolutionary Party
- In office 23 August 1984 – 14 March 1990
- Preceded by: Yumjaagiin Tsedenbal
- Succeeded by: Gombojavyn Ochirbat

Chairman of the Presidium of the People's Great Khural
- In office 12 December 1984 – 21 March 1990
- Preceded by: Nyamyn Jagvaral (acting)
- Succeeded by: Punsalmaagiin Ochirbat (as president)

13th Chairman of the Council of Ministers
- In office 11 June 1974 – 12 December 1984
- General Secretary: Yumjaagiin Tsedenbal
- Preceded by: Yumjaagiin Tsedenbal
- Succeeded by: Dumaagiin Sodnom

Personal details
- Born: 10 March 1926 Khyargas, Uvs, Mongolian People's Republic
- Died: 14 May 1997 (aged 71) Ulaanbaatar, Mongolia
- Resting place: Altan-Ölgii National Cemetery, Ulaanbaatar, Mongolia
- Party: Mongolian People's Revolutionary Party (1948–1990)
- Spouse: Avirmediin Daariimaa
- Education: National University of Mongolia
- Profession: Statesman, economist
- De facto leader of the MPR: ← Tsedenbal; Ochirbat →

Jambyn Batmönkh (Mongolian: Жамбын Батмөнх, pronounced [t͡ɕampíːɴ páʰtmɵŋx]; 10 March 1926 – 14 May 1997) was a Mongolian communist political leader and economics professor. He was the leader of Mongolian People's Republic from 1984 until its transition into democracy in 1990.

== Early life ==
Batmönkh was born in Khyargas sum of Uvs aimag on 10 March 1926. When starting primary school, he took his brother's name, Jamba, as a surname. After graduating seventh grade in his native Uvs aimag, he entered the National University of Mongolia's two year preparatory program. From 1947 to 1951, he studied at the National University's School of Economics.

He met his future wife when they were both 16 years old. Both Batmönkh and Daariimaa were housed in the same dormitory, when they were studying in the National University of Mongolia's School of Economics, and the Agricultural Technical College, respectively. They were married one year later. Daariimaa worked for 33 years at the National University of Mongolia Library, until 1988, when she retired.

== Early political career ==
Batmönkh became a member of the ruling Mongolian People's Revolutionary Party (MPRP) in 1948. In 1951, Batmönkh started work as a professor at the Pedagogical University. In 1973, after working as a professor and director at the university for over twenty years, he was promoted to Minister of Science (Superintendent of the Department of Science Education of the Party's Central Bureau). In the spring of 1974, he was promoted to Vice Chairman of the Council of Ministers of the MPRP. In June 1974, during a Session of the People's Great Khural, he was further promoted to the post of Chairman of the Council of Ministers, an office analogous to Prime Minister. In 1979, Jambyn Batmönkh had a conversation with Heng Samrin the Co-de facto leader of the People's Republic of Kampuchea.

== Leadership of Mongolia (1984–1990) ==
In 1984, along with D. Molomjamts, Batmönkh played a key role in easing the way of long-time party leader Yumjaagiin Tsedenbal out of power. In 1984, he became the head of state when Tsedenbal was ousted in a party congress. Batmönkh strengthened Mongolia's alliance with the Soviet Union, but as in many other communist countries, there was much pressure for the party to give up power. He also called for the improvement of relations with China, saying during a meeting with President Kim Il Sung while on a state visit to Pyongyang in November 1986 that "renewing the development of Sino-Mongolian relations is important for our two countries’ people's common interest".

Batmönkh's reign contributed to the creation of major energy (the construction of Ulaanbaatar and Erdenet power stations, and the connection of the Central high-power electric grid with the Soviet Union's Siberian Grid) and mining (the beginning of the operations of Erdenet and Baganuur coal mines, and Bor-Ondor gypsum mine) infrastructure, together with, various other light production and food processing factories.

=== Role in the Mongolian Revolution of 1990 ===
In late 1989, Mongolia's democratic movement gained momentum. In March 1990, the first organized opposition group, the Mongolian Democratic Union, launched a hunger strike demanding the resignation of the communist government led by Jambyn Batmönkh.

Batmönkh maintained a strict policy against the use of force and concluded that the only resolution was the resignation of the MPRP Politburo. Following discussions within the Politburo and the Eighth Congress of the Party's Central Committee, the Mongolian People's Revolutionary Party officially relinquished power on 9 March 1990. Batmönkh later became associated with the principle "Never use force," which became the title of a book published about the events.

Batmönkh’s widow later recalled the events of that day:

"It was March of 1990. Batmönkh was at home preparing his speech for the MPRP’s 8th Congress when the phone rang. After a short conversation, he suddenly said, 'We few Mongolians should never make each other's noses bleed,' and threw the phone down, something very uncharacteristic for such a calm person. He told me that some leaders had come to ask him to sign something and that he would be back soon. He was visibly flustered, kept looking for his tie though it was right next to him, and left after drinking only a cup of tea.

I stayed at home, nervous about the protests outside. Later, I learned that he had been asked to sign a decree authorizing a crackdown on the demonstrators. Those present recalled that Batmönkh said, 'I will never sign this. We few Mongols have not yet come to the point that we will make each other's noses bleed,' before striking the table and leaving the room.

He had resigned by the time he came home that evening. He didn’t tell me the details, he was never one to speak much about work. He was a very calm person."

== Later life ==
In 1990, most of his family members became unemployed after being accused of political corruption. He and his wife made bread and sold deel and gutals. From 1992 until his death, he lived in Dambadarjaa (Sukhbaatar district) while planting vegetables and fruits.

He was privately critical of the new administration (particularly of Punsalmaagiin Ochirbat, the new president) after his retirement. He died in 1997 and was buried at the Altan-Ölgii National Cemetery.

== In popular culture ==
Batmönkh's role in the 1990 democratic movement was dramatized in the 2016 Mongolian film "Don't Forget" ("Бүү март").

Party political offices
| Preceded by Yumjaagiin Tsedenbal | General Secretary of the Mongolian People's Party; August 24, 1984–March 14, 1990 | Succeeded by Gombojavyn Ochirbat |
Political offices
| Preceded by Yumjaagiin Tsedenbal | Prime Minister of Mongolia; June 11, 1974–December 12, 1984 | Succeeded by Dumaagiin Sodnom |
| Preceded by Nyamyn Jagvaral | Chairman of the Presidium of the State Great Khural; December 12, 1984–March 21, 1990 | Succeeded by Punsalmaagiin Ochirbat |
