= Gombojavyn Ochirbat =

Mongolian politician and union leader (born 1929)

- Гомбожавын Очирбат
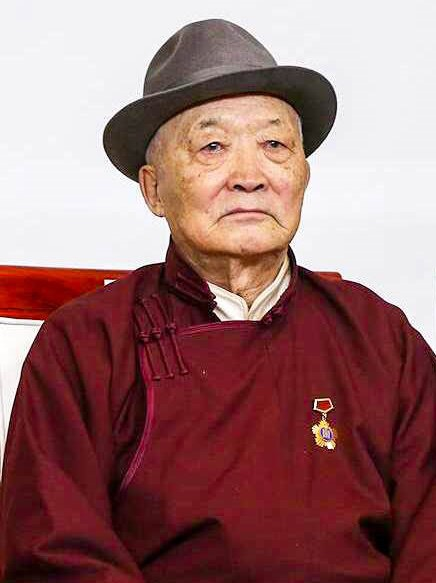
- Ochirbat in 2020

Chairman of the Mongolian People's Revolutionary Party (Note: From 14 March 1990 to 13 April 1990, the title of the office was General Secretary.)
- In office 14 March 1990 – 28 February 1991
- Preceded by: Jambyn Batmönkh (as General Secretary)
- Succeeded by: Büdragchaagiin Dash-Yondon

Personal details
- Born: 15 November 1929 (age 96) Nömrög, Zavkhan, Mongolia
- Party: Mongolian People's Revolutionary Party
- De facto leader of the MPR: ← Batmönkh; (Last in role) →

Gombojavyn Ochirbat (Mongolian: Гомбожавын Очирбат; born 15 November 1929) is a Mongolian politician and trade union leader. He was the General Secretary of the ruling Mongolian People's Revolutionary Party in March and April 1990 amid democratic constitutional reforms, and was then its Chairman from April 1990 to 1991.

== Biography ==
Gombojavyn Ochirbat was born in 1929 in Nömrög District, Zavkhan Province. He graduated from Mongolian State University, and studied at Moscow State University from 1952 to 1958. Upon his return, he became a lecturer at the MSU, and then was editor-in-chief of the State Committee on the Press from 1958 to 1962. He was deputy editor-in-chief of the Mongolian People's Revolutionary Party paper Ünen from 1962 to 1964.

From 1962 to 1969, Ochirbat served as head of the Ideological Department of the MPRP Central Committee, of which he was a member from 1966 to 1992. He studied at the Academy of Social Sciences of the Soviet Communist Party Central Committee, graduating with a higher degree in philosophy in 1972. He was elected chairman of the Central Council of the Mongolian Trade Unions (MTU) in October 1972. Ochirbat was also a MPRP deputy to the People's Great Khural from 1966 to 1983, and a member of its presidium from 1977 to 1982. Ochirbat was ousted from the MTU in May 1982 by leader Yumjaagiin Tsedenbal, and then worked in the Ministry of Education and the Institute of Social Sciences. After Tsedenbal's fall, Ochirbat was made the acting deputy head of the Cadres Department of the MPRP Central Committee from 1985 to 1988. He was then the Mongolian representative on the editorial board of the communist journal Problems of Peace and Socialism, published in Prague.

Following Jambyn Batmönkh's resignation in March 1990 amid protests for democracy, Ochirbat was elected general secretary of the party (in March and April 1991). After constitutional reforms, he became chairman from April 1990 to February 1991, when he was replaced by Büdragchaagiin Dash-Yondon. He was an MPRP deputy to the People's Great Khural for Ulaanbaatar 12 (1990–1992). From 1992, he was secretary of the MPRP Chairman's Council.

== Notes ==
Party political offices
Preceded by Jambyn Batmönkh	General Secretary of the Central Committee of the Mongolian People's Party; 14 March 1990 - 13 April 1990	Succeeded by Büdragchaagiin Dash-Yondon
