= List of de facto leaders of the Socialist Republic of Romania =

De facto leader of the Romanian People's Republic/Socialist Republic of Romania
- Emblems of the People's Republic of Romania/Socialist Republic of Romania

- Flags of the People's Republic of Romania/Socialist Republic of Romania

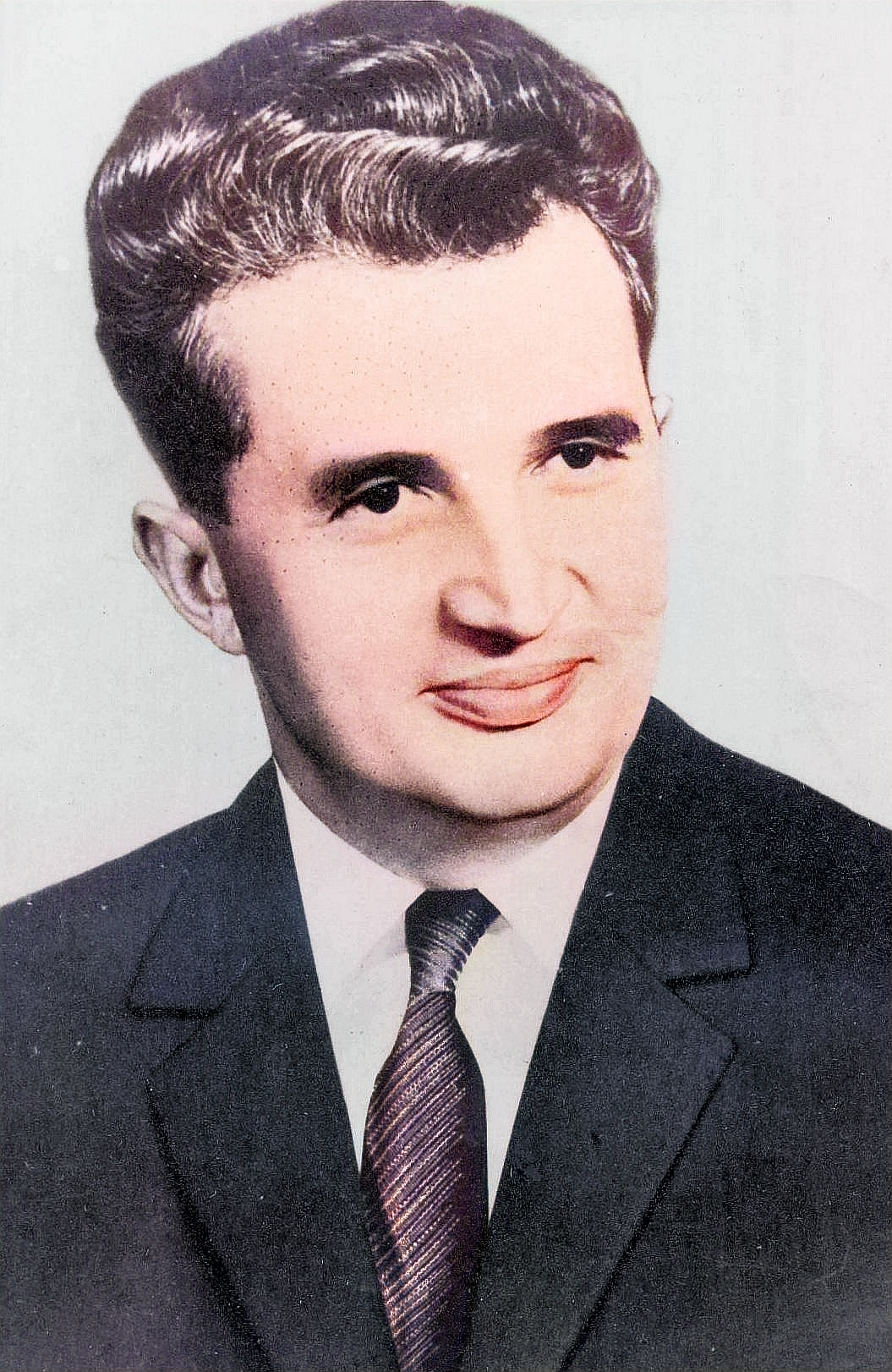
- Longest in role Nicolae Ceaușescu; 22 March 1965 – 22 December 1989
- Status: Informal term for the most important political figure of the Romanian People's Republic/Socialist Republic of Romania (Note: The de facto leader wasn't a formal position nor an office unto itself.)
- Reports to: Allied Commission of Romania (1947–1958) (Note: The Head of the Allied Commission of Romania was Rodion Malinovsky, who was represented by Vladislav Petrovich Vinogradov.)
- Formation: December 30, 1947; 78 years ago
- First holder: Ana Pauker and Gheorghe Gheorghiu-Dej
- Final holder: Ion Iliescu
- Abolished: December 26, 1989; 36 years ago

The Romanian People's Republic/Socialist Republic of Romania had most of the time of its existence a de facto leader which wasn't necessarily the head of state or head of government, but was often the First Secretary/General Secretary of the Romanian Communist Party. During the first secretaryship of Gheorghe Apostol, between 1954 and 1955, the RCP was led by a collective leadership; in this one year, the first secretary wasn't the de facto leader. During the general secretaryship of Nicolae Ceaușescu, the RCP was for a time led by a collective leadership, but this time the general secretary was still the de facto leader.

== List ==
No.	Portrait	Name (Birth–Death)	Term of office			Party	References
No.	Portrait	Name (Birth–Death)	Took office	Left office	Time in office	Party	References
1		Ana Pauker (1893–1960) and Gheorghe Gheorghiu-Dej (1901–1965)	30 December 1947	1 June 1952	4 years, 154 days	Romanian Communist Party	
2		Gheorghe Gheorghiu-Dej (1901–1965)	1 June 1952	19 March 1965	12 years, 291 days	Romanian Communist Party	
Vacancy of the office of the First Secretary of the Romanian Communist Party (19 March 1965 – 22 March 1965)
3		Nicolae Ceaușescu (1918–1989)	22 March 1965	22 December 1989	24 years, 245 days	Romanian Communist Party	
4		Ion Iliescu (1930–2025)	22 December 1989	26 December 1989	4 days	National Salvation Front	
None; Ion Iliescu as Interim President of Romania/Chairman of the Council of the National Salvation Front (Head of State) and Petre Roman as Interim Prime Minister of Romania (Head of Government) (26 December 1989 – 28 December 1989)

== See also ==
- Supreme Leader of Democratic Kampuchea
- Supreme Leader (North Korean title)
- List of de facto leaders of the People's Republic of Bulgaria
- List of de facto leaders of Hungary (1945–1989)
- List of leaders of the Soviet Union
- List of de facto rulers of the Czechoslovak Socialist Republic
- List of de facto leaders of the Polish People's Republic
- De facto leader of the GDR
- List of de facto leaders of the Mongolian People's Republic
- List of de facto leaders of the People's Republic of Kampuchea
- Paramount leader
