= List of de facto leaders of the People's Republic of Bulgaria =

List of de facto leaders of the PRB

De facto leader of the People's Republic of Bulgaria
- Logo of the Bulgarian Communist Party and the emblems of the People's Republic of Bulgaria

- Flag of the Bulgarian Communist Party and the flags of the People's Republic of Bulgaria

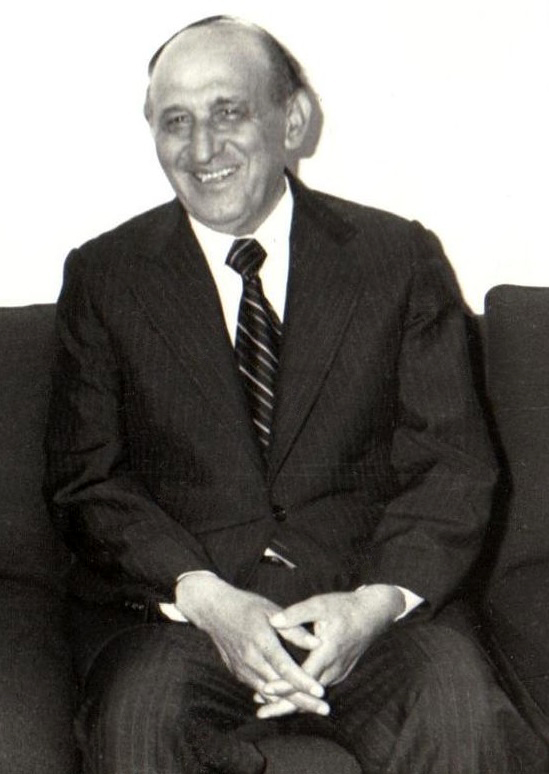
- Longest in role Todor Zhivkov; 26 January 1954 – 10 November 1989
- Status: Informal term for the most important political figure of the People's Republic of Bulgaria (Note: The de facto leader was not a formal position nor an office unto itself.)
- Formation: September 15, 1946; 80 years ago
- First holder: Georgi Dimitrov
- Final holder: Petar Mladenov
- Abolished: January 15, 1990; 36 years ago

The de facto leader of the People's Republic of Bulgaria was an informal term for the most important political figure of the People's Republic of Bulgaria, the de facto leader wasn't necessarily the head of state or head of government but was often the General Secretary of the Bulgarian Communist Party. From 15 September 1946 until 15 January 1990, the Bulgarian Communist Party had a monopoly on power. And with it, real power lay in the Central Committee of the Bulgarian Communist Party.

== List ==
No.	Portrait	Name (Birth–Death)	Term of office			Party	References
No.	Portrait	Name (Birth–Death)	Took office	Left office	Time in office	Party	References
1		Georgi Dimitrov (1882–1949)	15 September 1946	2 July 1949	2 years, 290 days	Bulgarian Communist Party	
2		Vasil Kolarov (1877–1950)	16 June 1949	23 January 1950	221 days	Bulgarian Communist Party	
3		Valko Chervenkov (1900–1980)	23 January 1950	26 January 1954	4 years, 3 days	Bulgarian Communist Party	
4		Collective leadership (Members: Valko Chervenkov (1900–1980) and Todor Zhivkov (1911–1998))	26 January 1954	17 April 1956	2 years, 82 days	Bulgarian Communist Party	
5		Todor Zhivkov (1911–1998)	17 April 1956	10 November 1989	33 years, 207 days	Bulgarian Communist Party	
6		Petar Mladenov (1936–2000)	10 November 1989	15 January 1990	66 days	Bulgarian Communist Party	

== See also ==
- List of leaders of the Soviet Union
- List of de facto leaders of Hungary (1945–1989)
- List of de facto leaders of the Socialist Republic of Romania
- List of de facto leaders of the Polish People's Republic
- List of de facto rulers of the Czechoslovak Socialist Republic
- De facto leader of the GDR
- List of de facto leaders of the Mongolian People's Republic
- List of de facto leaders of the People's Republic of Kampuchea
