= Gonchigiin Bumtsend =

Mongolian politician

Gonchigiin Bumtsend Гончигийн Бумцэнд
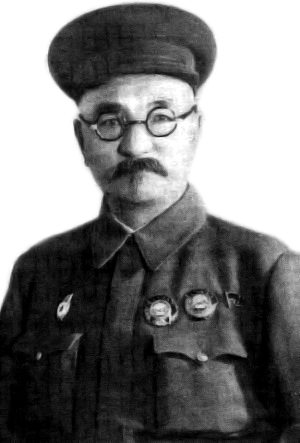

8th Chairman of the Presidium of the State Great Khural (to 6 July 1951 as Chairman of the Presidium of the State Little Khural)
- In office 6 July 1940 – 23 September 1953
- Preceded by: Dansrabilegiin Dogsom
- Succeeded by: Sükhbaataryn Yanjmaa (acting); Jamsrangiin Sambuu

Personal details
- Born: 11 September 1881 Züünbürenhanuul Hoshuu, Tüsheet-Khan Province, Outer Mongolia, Qing Empire (present-day Yeröö district, Selenge, Mongolia)
- Died: 23 September 1953 (aged 72) Ulaanbaatar, Mongolian People's Republic
- Party: Mongolian People's Revolutionary Party

Gonchigiin Bumtsend (Mongolian: Гончигийн Бумцэнд; 11 September 1881 – 23 September 1953) was a Mongolian revolutionary who held several high level positions within the Mongolian government in the 1940s and early 1950s. He was Chairman of the Presidium of the State Little Khural (titular head of state) of the Mongolian People's Republic from July 1940 until his death, 1953.

== Early life and career ==
Bumtsend was born on 11 September 1881 in Züünbürenhanuul Hoshuu, Tüsheet Khan Province (present day Yeröö district, Selenge Province). The son of a poor herding family, Bumtsend taught himself to read and write Mongolian script at age 13 and helped illiterate herdsmen in his area write petitions to the government. In his youth he worked as a woodworker and a cart driver at a horse relay station. During the Bogd Khanaate he worked as a laborer in Khüree (present day Ulaanbaatar).

Bumtsend made his first contact with Mongolian revolutionaries in 1920 while working for the administration of his local hoshuu. He helped collect winter clothing for the partisan army and was involved in propaganda work. He was made a unit commander in the Mongolian partisan army commanded by Damdin Sükhbaatar during the Mongolian Revolution of 1921 and played a role in the defeat of the Chinese garrison at Kyakhta in March 1921. After Mongolian partisans and Soviet Red Army troops successfully entered Khüree in July of that year, Bumtsend's unit participated in several mop up guerrilla operations against remnants Baron Roman von Ungern-Sternberg's forces. His unit then suppressed counterrevolutionary uprisings in eastern Mongolia.

He joined the Mongolian People's Revolutionary Party in 1923 and spent much of the 1920s working as a police chief while strengthening the administrative structures of the revolution in his home district. Through most of the 1930s he supervised cooperatives in Selenge Province and, as head of the local party cell, was directly involved in efforts to expropriate property of local nobles and the expel Chinese traders from the country.

== Head of state ==
Bumtsend was chosen to serve as chairman of the Presidium of the State Small Khural (titular head of state) at the Tenth Party Congress in 1940. It was an honorary role, with power residing in the hands of the prime minister, Khorloogiin Choibalsan. He became a member of the country's Politburo in 1943 and chairman of the Great Khural in 1951. He died in office on September 23, 1953, aged 72.

He was twice awarded the Order of Sukhbaatar and received the Soviet Order of Lenin.

== Sources ==
- Sanders, Alan J. K., Historical Dictionary of Mongolia, 1996, Scarecrow Press, ISBN 0810830779, p. 29.

Preceded by Dansrabilegiin Dogsom	Chairman of the Presidium of the State Little Khural; 6 July 1940 – 23 September 1953	Succeeded by Sükhbaataryn Yanjmaa
