= Sükhbaataryn Yanjmaa =

Mongolian politician (1894–1962)

- Сүхбаатарын Янжмаа
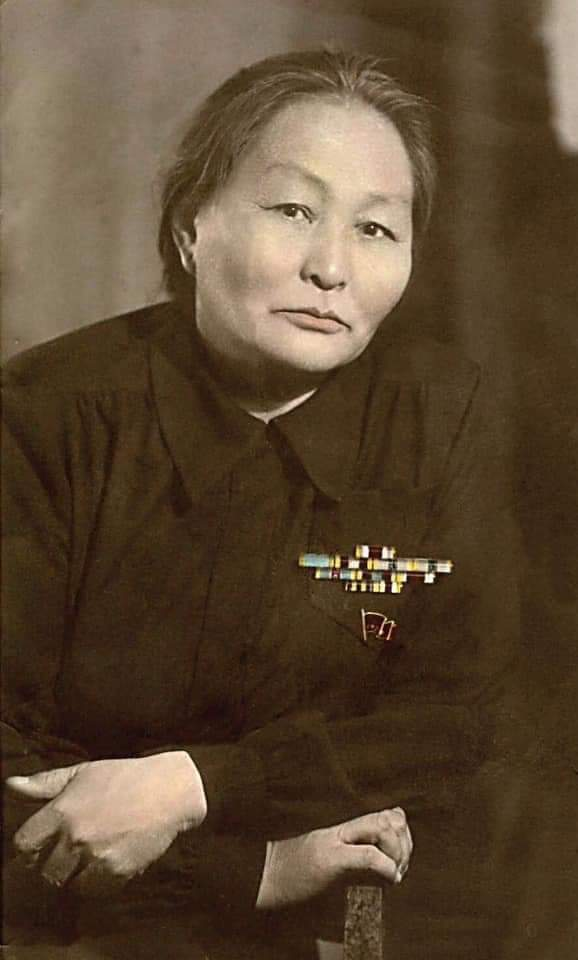
- Yanjmaa in 1950

Chairwoman of the Presidium of the State Great Khural
- Acting
- In office 7 September 1953 – 7 July 1954
- Prime Minister: Yumjaagiin Tsedenbal
- Preceded by: Gonchigiin Bumtsend
- Succeeded by: Jamsrangiin Sambuu

Personal details
- Born: 15 February 1893 Khüree, Mongolia, Qing China
- Died: 1 May 1962 (aged 69) Ulaanbaatar, Mongolian People's Republic
- Party: Mongolian People's Revolutionary Party
- Spouse: Damdin Sükhbaatar

Sükhbaataryn Yanjmaa (Note: Mongolian: Сүхбаатарын Янжмаа, spelled Sykebaatariin Janƶimaa between 1931 and 1941, [suxˈbaːt(ə)riŋ jɑnd͡ʒˈmaː]; born Nemendeyen Yanjmaa (Mongolian: Нэмэндэен Янжмаа)) (15 February 1893 – 1 May 1962) was a Mongolian politician. As Chairwoman of the Presidium of the State Great Khural, she became the second non-hereditary woman head of state after Khertek Anchimaa-Toka of Tannu Tuva, and the first in an internationally-recognized country. She was the widow of Mongolian revolutionary leader Damdin Sükhbaatar.

== Life ==
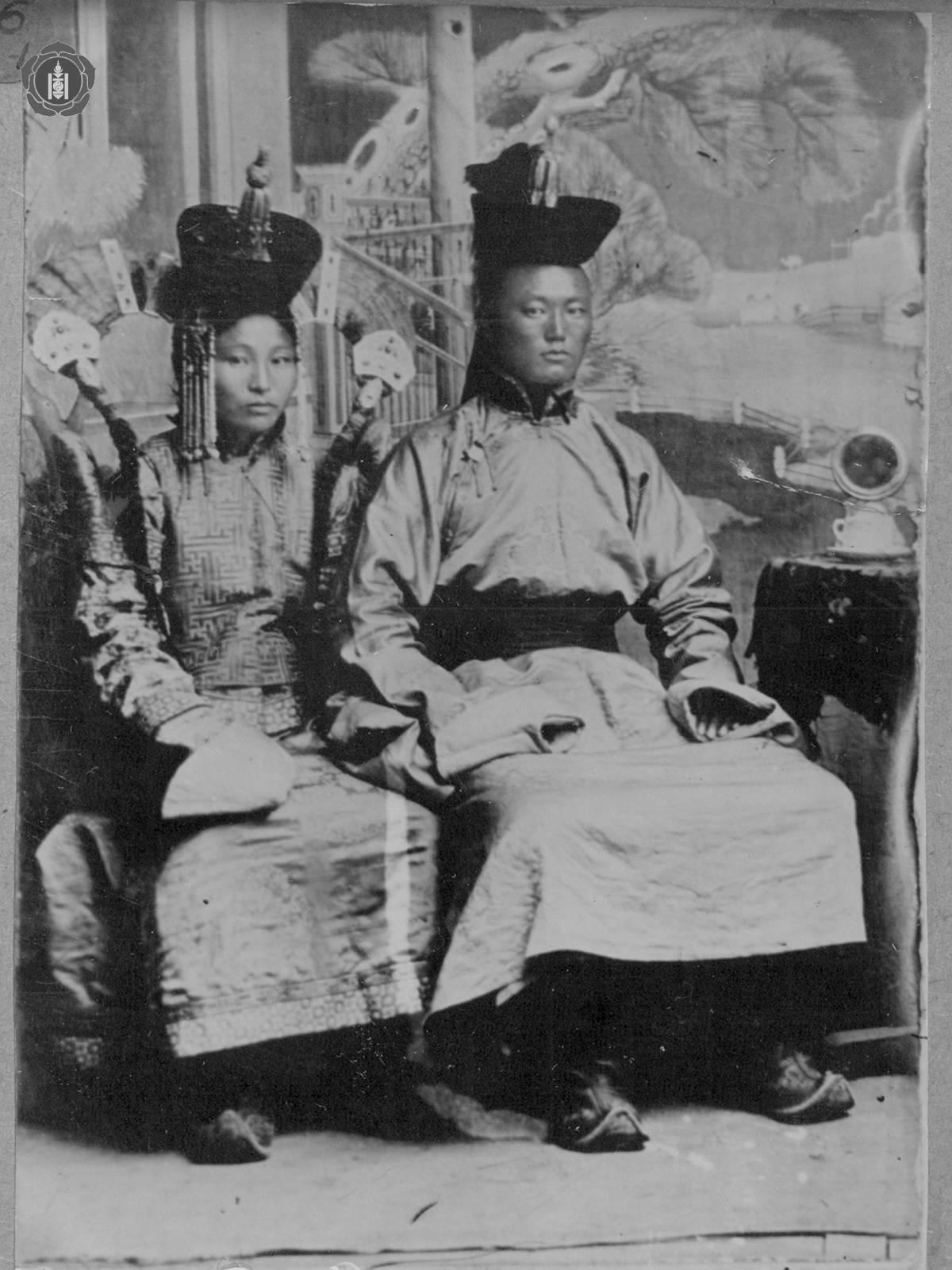
Yanjmaa (left) with her husband Damdin Sükhbaatar who died in 1923

Yanjmaa was born on February 15, 1893, into a poor herding family near present-day Ulaanbaatar. She worked for Sükhbaatar's revolutionary group as a messenger in 1919 and when her husband travelled to the Soviet Union in 1920 to establish contact with Bolshevik revolutionaries, Yanjmaa stayed behind in Ulaanbaatar with their son, evading capture from Chinese officials hunting down subversives. In 1921 Khorloogiin Choibalsan helped her and her son flee to Kyakhta to be reunited with Sükhbaatar.

External images
- Yanjmaa (left) with her son, October 1939
- Yanjmaa (right) on a military parade in Mongolia, 1954

After her husband led Mongolian partisans to victory in the Outer Mongolian Revolution of 1921, Yanjmaa became a member of the Mongolian Revolutionary Youth League (MYRL). When Sükhbaatar died in 1923, she adopted "Sükhbaataryn" in place of her patronymic Nemedeyen and joined the Mongolian People's Revolutionary Party (MPRP) a year later in 1924. As a member of the party Central Committee and of the Presidium of the Central Committee, she represented the MPRP at the Third International Conference of Communist Women (where she met Clara Zetkin and Nadezhda Krupskaya) and the Fifth World Congress of the Comintern in Moscow, both in 1924. She was involved in the creation of Mongolia's first trade union in 1925. From 1927 to 1930 she studied at the Communist University of the Toilers of the East in Moscow. In 1933 Yanjmaa headed the newly created women's section of the MPRP Central Committee where she focused on developing women's education.

From 1940 until 1954, Yanjmaa served on the MPRP politburo and was Secretary of the party's Central Committee from 1941 until 1947. She was a member of the Presidium of the Little Khural (the executive committee of the State Great Khural, or Parliament) from 1940 to 1950. During World War II Yanjmaa helped raise funds to support the Soviet Union for which she was awarded the Soviet Order of the Red Banner of Labour in 1946. In 1945 she was elected a member of the Women's International Democratic Federation (WIDF).

Yanjmaa was a member of the People's Great Khural from 1950 to 1962. Following the death of Gonchigiin Bumtsend, she became acting President of Mongolia for the transitional period, lasting from 23 September 1953 until 8 July 1954. This made her the second woman in the role of formal head of state of a republic, after Khertek Anchimaa-Toka in the Tuvan People's Republic.

== Sources ==
- Sanders, Alan J. K. (1996). Historical dictionary of Mongolia. Asian historical dictionaries, No. 19. Lanham, MD: Scarecrow. ISBN 978-0-8108-3077-6
- Baabar, B. (1999). History of Mongolia. Cambridge: University of Cambridge. OCLC 318985384

Political offices
Preceded by Gonchigiin Bumtsend	Chairwoman of the Presidium of the State Great Khural; Acting; 1953–1954	Succeeded by Jamsrangiin Sambuu
