= Tsagaanlamyn Dügersüren =

Mongolian politician (1914–1986)

- Цагаанламын Дүгэрсүрэн
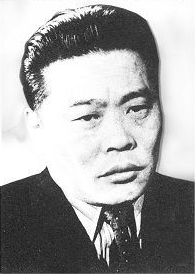

Chairman of the Presidium of the State Little Khural
- Acting
- In office May 20, 1972 – June 29, 1972
- Preceded by: Jamsrangiin Sambuu
- Succeeded by: Sonomyn Luvsan (acting)

Personal details
- Born: 1914
- Died: 1986 (aged 71–72)

Tsagaanlamyn Dügersüren (Mongolian: Цагаанламын Дүгэрсүрэн; 1914–1986) was acting Chairman of the Presidium of the State Little Khural (acting titular head of state) of the Mongolian People's Republic from May 20 to June 29, 1972, following the death of Jamsrangiin Sambuu.

Political offices
Preceded by Jamsrangiin Sambuu	President of Mongolia (acting); May 20, 1972 – June 29, 1972	Succeeded by Sonomyn Luvsan
