= Gutals =

Traditional footwear of Mongolia

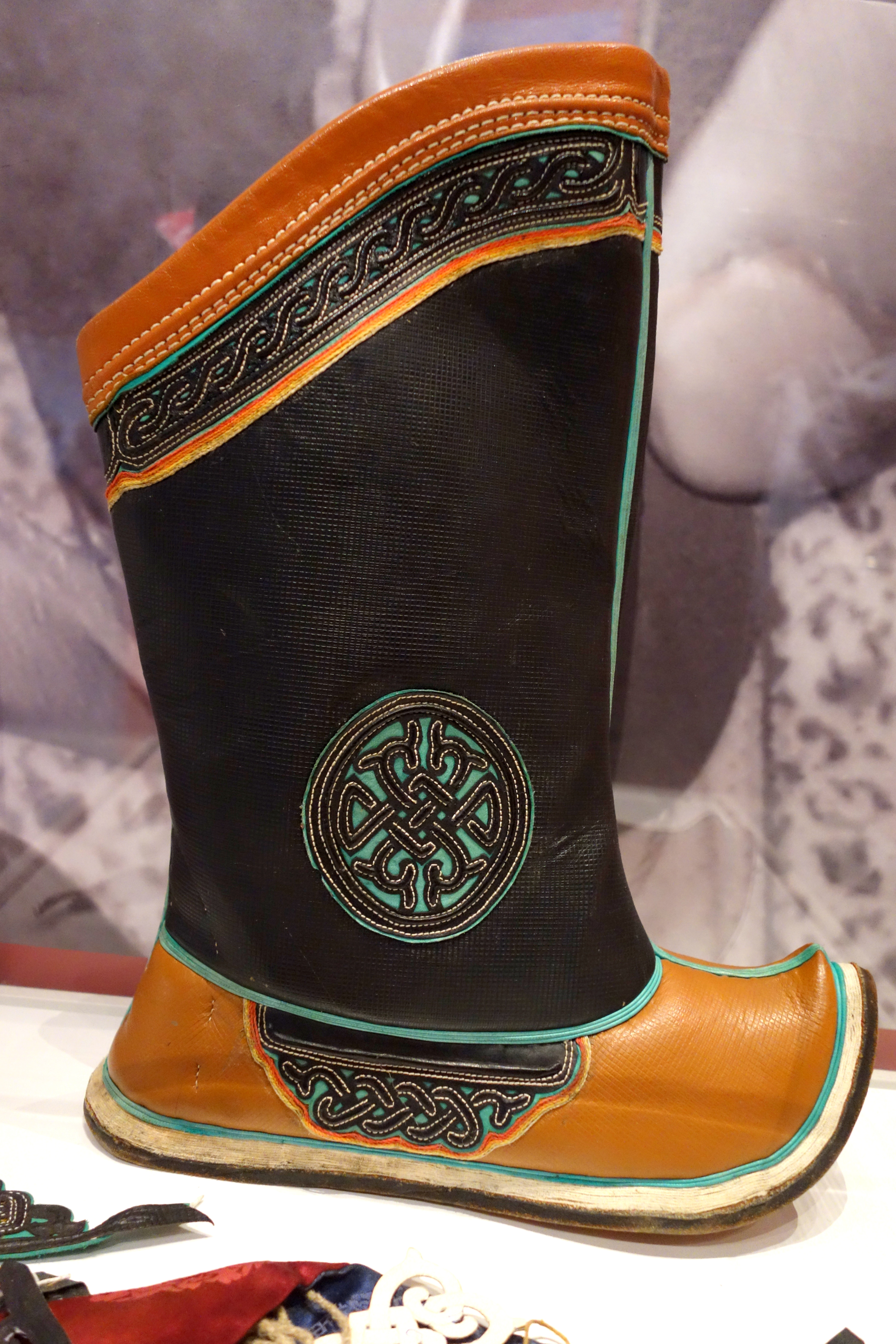
Single gutal with black and light brown colors and few ornaments

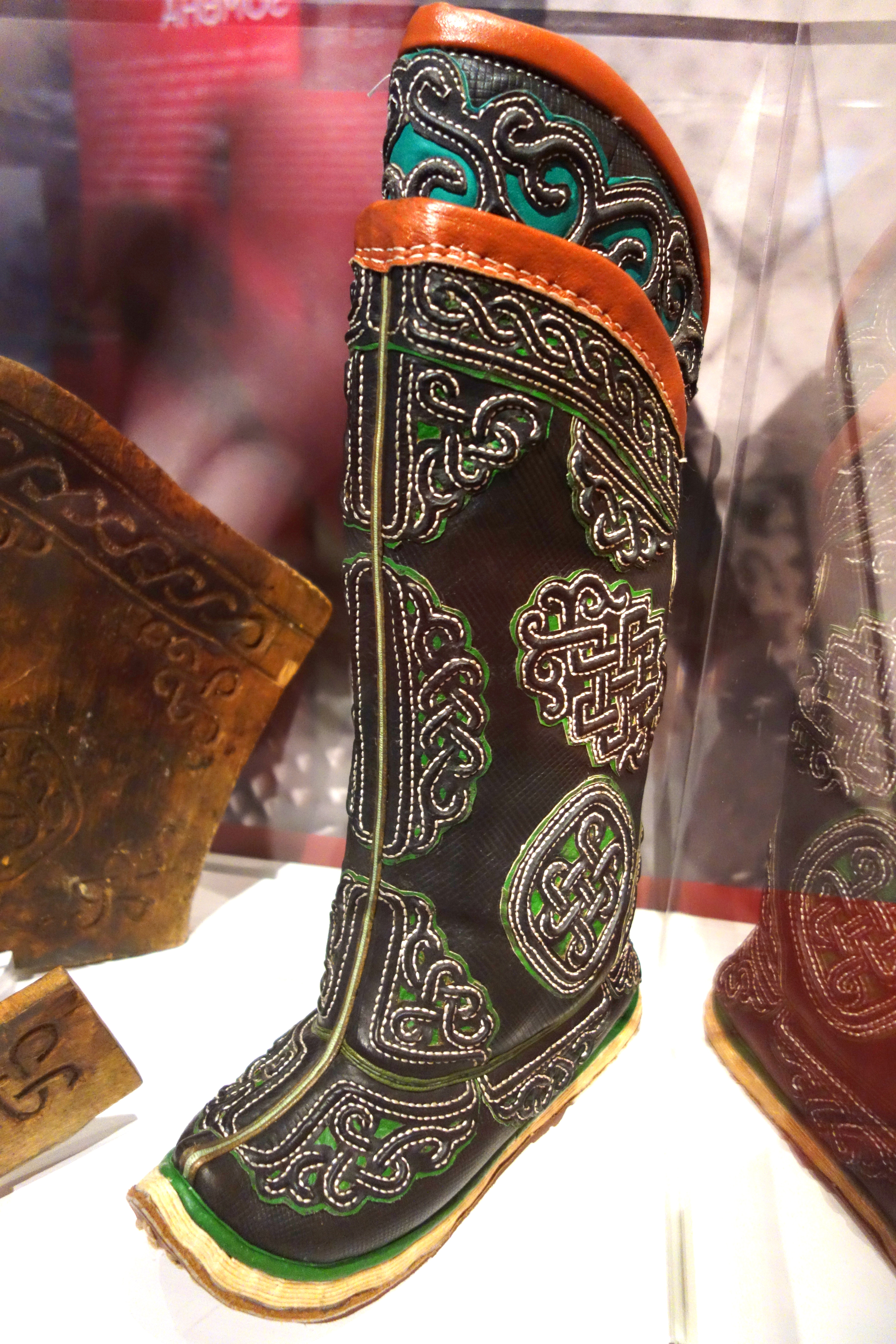
Single gutal with an extra leather piece on the top and many ornaments attached

Mongol gutals or gutuls (Mongolian: гутал, Mongolian pronunciation: [ɢʊtʰəɮ]; plural гутлууд, IPA: [ɢʊtʰɮu꞉t]) are leather boots that are a traditional footwear of Mongolia. Some unique features of the boots include slightly upturned tip of the toes, different varieties of leather ornaments and vertically uneven cuts at the entering holes of the footwear. Gutals can be used especially as horseback riding and wrestling footwear. However, there are not authentic gutals; they entered Mongolia from Tibet during the 17th century.

Mongols still wear gutals today.

In the 2020 video game Ghost of Tsushima, it is possible to find an artifact item that represents traditional Mongolian gutal boots. There is some speculation that, in the comic book Dragon Ball, a character called Gokū regularly wears boots that might be originally inspired by gutals.

== Gallery ==
Different designs of gutal boots:

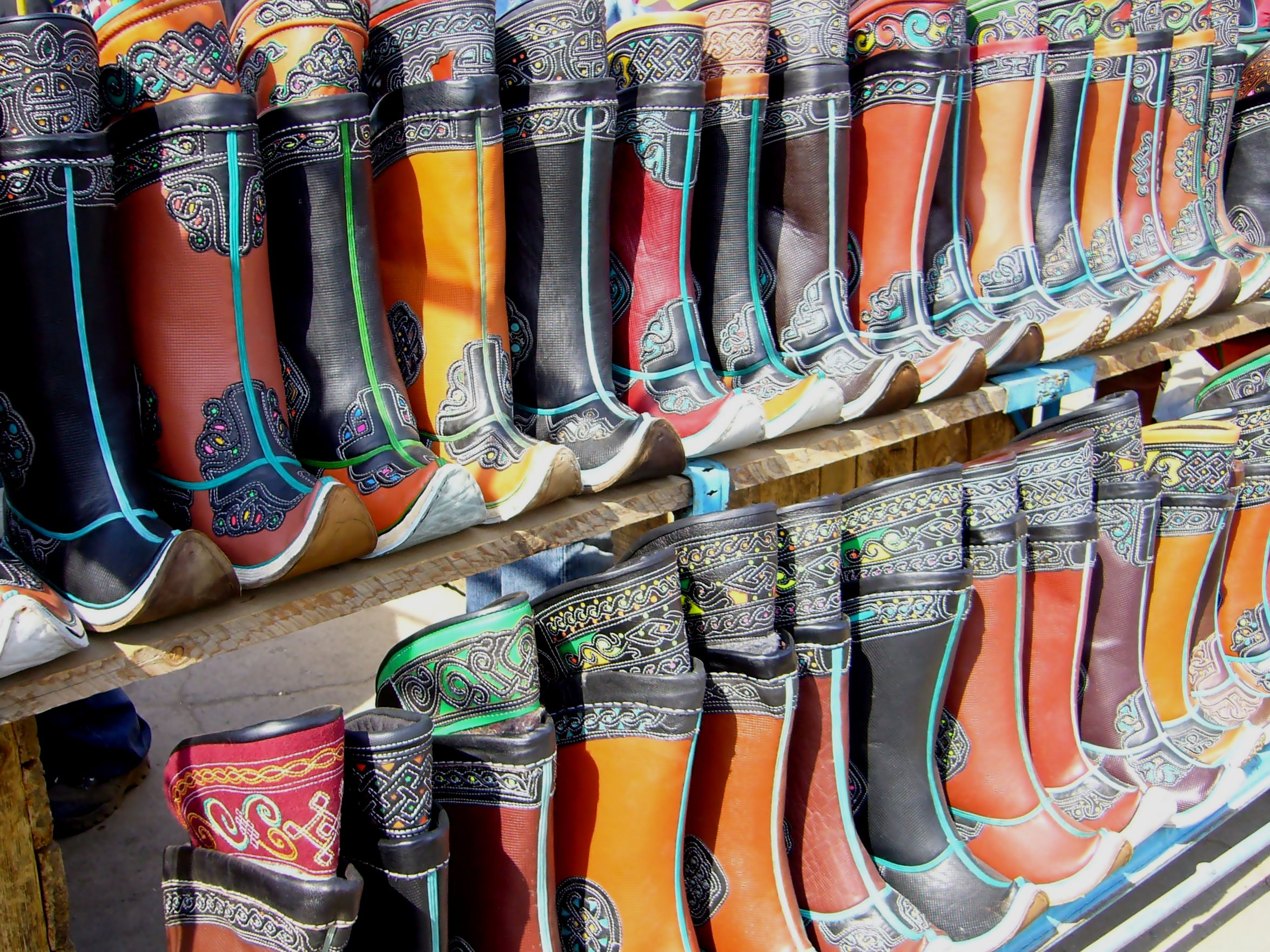

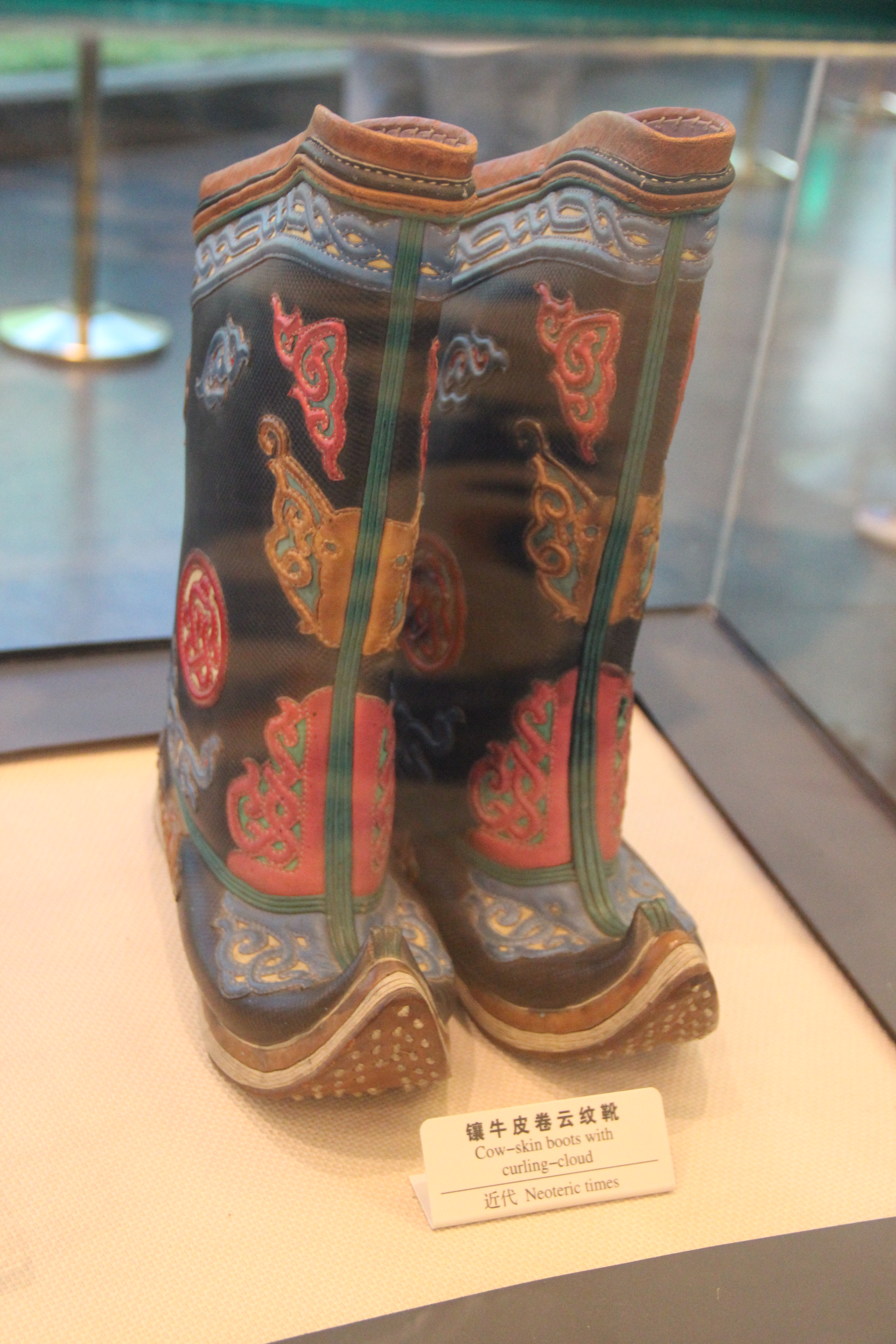

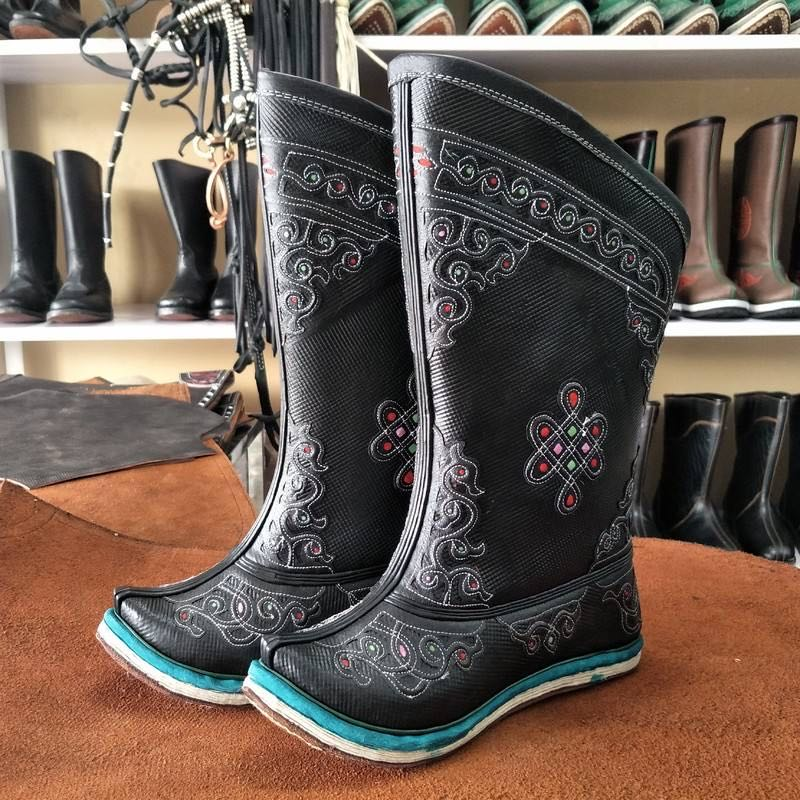

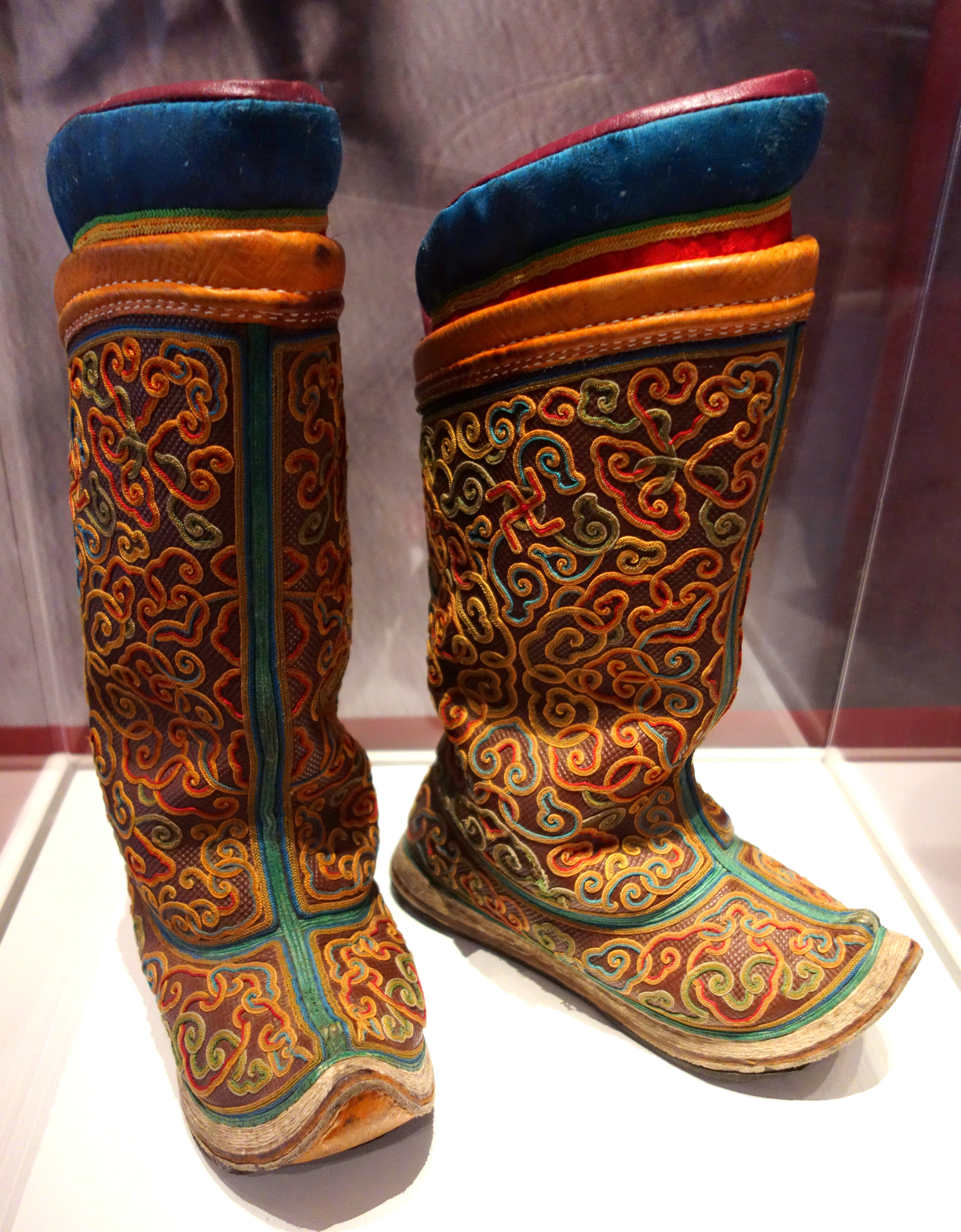

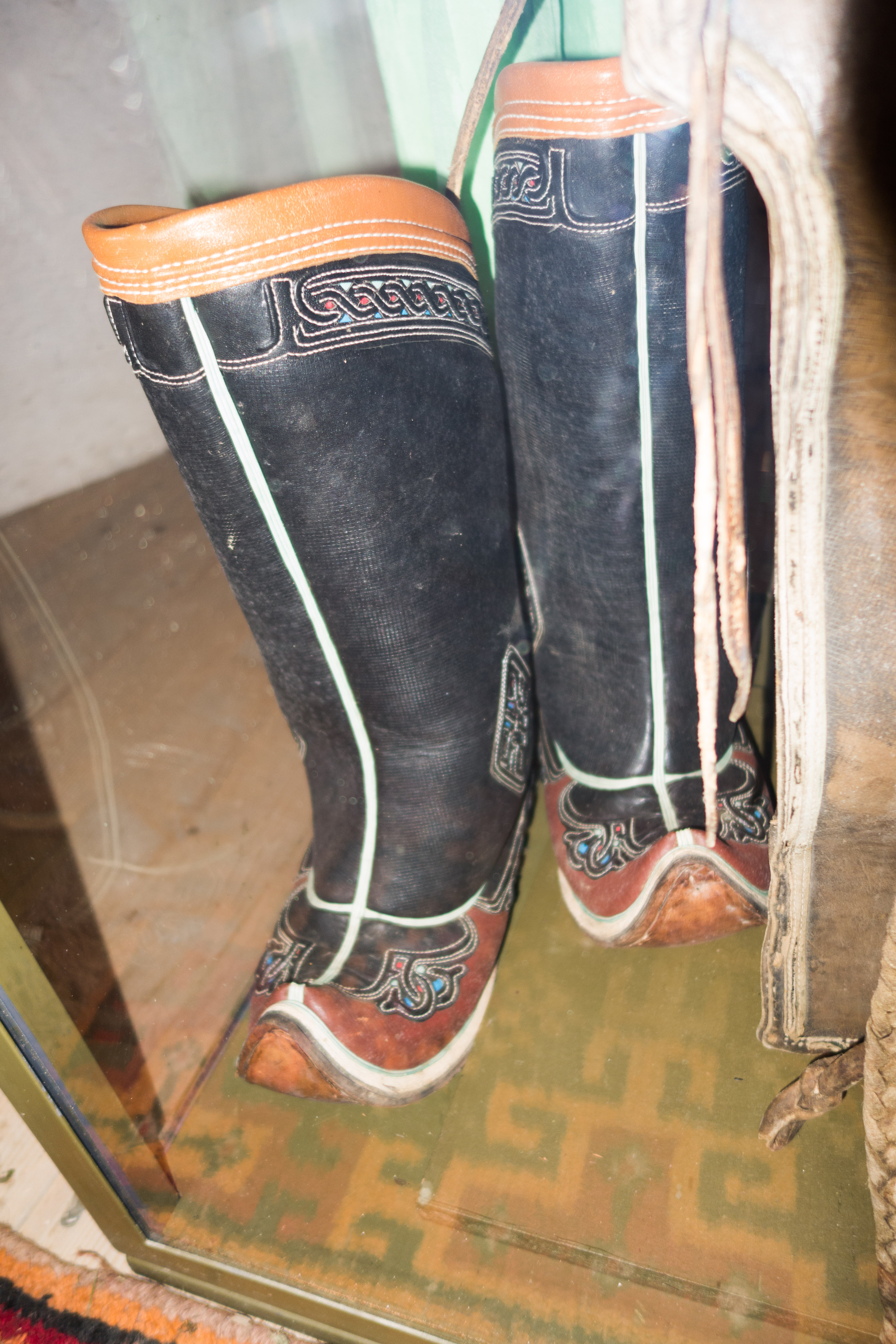

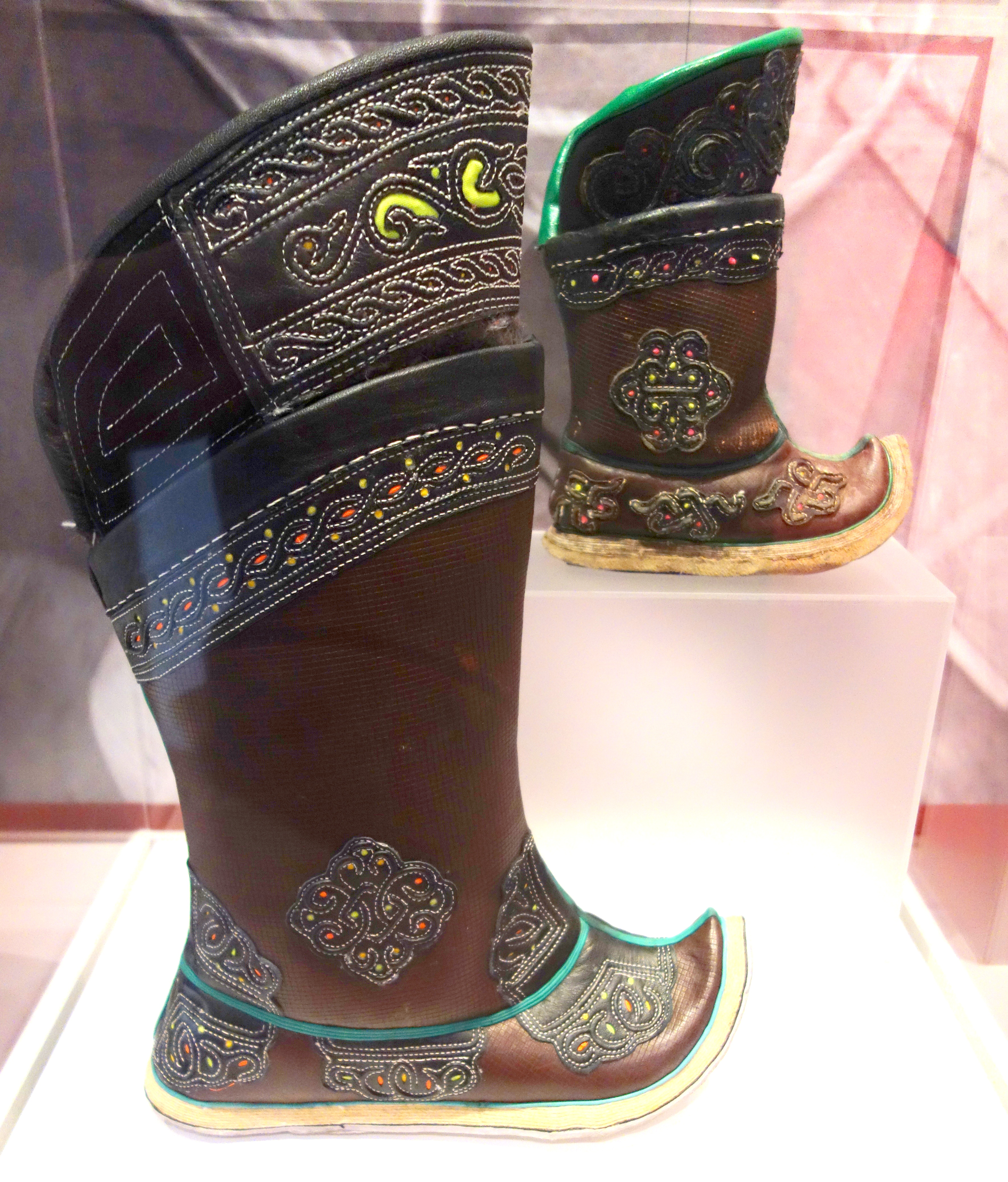

== See also ==
- Deel
- List of shoe styles
