= Büdragchaagiin Dash-Yondon =

Mongolian politician (born 1946)

- Бүдрагчаагийн Даш-Ёндон

Secretary General of the Mongolian People's Revolutionary Party (Note: From 28 February 1991 to 5 October 1992, the title of the office was Chairman.)
- In office 28 February 1991 – 28 July 1996
- Preceded by: Gombojavyn Ochirbat (as Chairman)
- Succeeded by: Nambaryn Enkhbayar

Personal details
- Born: 1946 (age 79–80) Tsetserleg, Khövsgöl, Mongolia
- Party: Mongolian People's Revolutionary Party

Büdragchaagiin Dash-Yondon (Mongolian: Бүдрагчаагийн Даш-Ёндон; born 1946) is a Mongolian politician and teacher of history and philosophy. He was the leader of the Mongolian People's Revolutionary Party from 1991 to 1996, as its Chairman from 1991 to 1992 then as Secretary General from 1992 to 1996.

== Biography ==
Büdragchaagiin Dash-Yondon was born in 1946 in Tsetserleg District, Khövsgöl Province. He graduated from the Mongolian State University (MSU) in 1968, earning his higher degree as a candidate of philosophy. He first began working as a history teacher at the university from 1968 to 1974, before he was appointed as an instructor at the Mongolian People's Revolutionary Party Central Committee (1978–1979), and then deputy director of the MPRP Higher Party School (1979–1985). Dash-Yondon then served as deputy head (1985–March 1990) and then head of the Party Organization Department of the Central Committee (March–April 1990), a member of the MPRP Central Auditing Commission (1986–1990), and a full member of the Central Committee (November 1990–October 1992). He served as an MPRP deputy to the People's Great Khural for the Ulaanbaatar 42 constituency (1990–1992). He was the chairman of the Ulaanbaatar MPRP committee (April 1990–February 1991) and a full member of the MPRP Presidium (November 1990–February 1991).

In February 1991, Dash-Yondon became chairman of the MPRP. The position was renamed secretary-general in October 1992, and he held the post until July 1996. He was an unsuccessful MPRP candidate for the Khövsgöl 47 constituency in the 1996 Great Khural election, and served as a political policy aide in the presidential secretariat (March–June 1997) before becoming the political policy aide to President Natsagiin Bagabandi from June 1997. He was appointed Mongolia's ambassador to Bulgaria in 2001 and served there until June 2005. As of March 2009, Dash-Yondon was teaching at the Institute of Philosophy, Sociology, and Law of the Academy of Sciences. He developed an interest in the Buddhist patriarch Nagarjuna, and has written about him.
