= Jamsrangiin Sambuu =

Mongolian politician (1895–1972)

- Жамсрангийн Самбуу
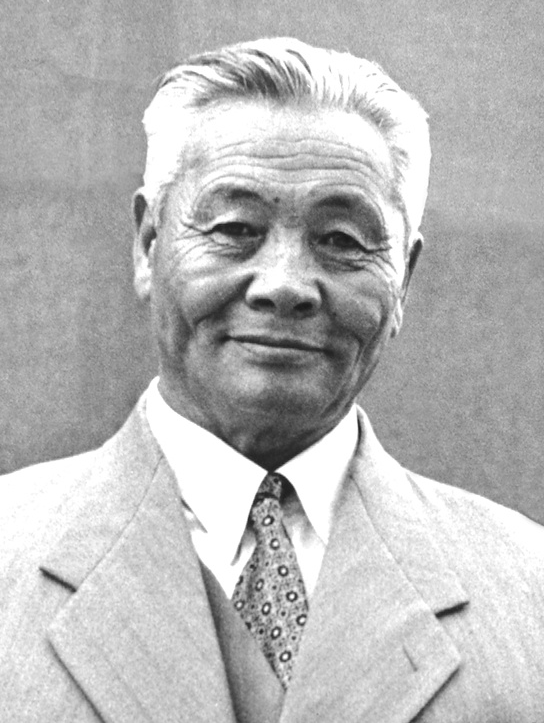

Chairman of the Presidium of the People's Great Khural (to 7 July 1960 as Chairman of the Presidium of the State Great Khural)
- In office 7 July 1954 – 20 May 1972
- Preceded by: Sükhbaataryn Yanjmaa (acting); Gonchigiin Bumtsend (8th)
- Succeeded by: Tsagaanlamyn Dügersüren (acting); Yumjaagiin Tsedenbal (10th)

Personal details
- Born: 27 June 1895 Büren sum, Töv aimag, Mongolia,
- Died: 21 May 1972 (aged 76) Ulaanbaatar, Mongolian People's Republic

Jamsrangiin Sambuu (Mongolian: Жамсрангийн Самбуу; June 27, 1895 – May 21, 1972) was a Mongolian politician and diplomat who, as chairman of the presidium of the Mongolian People's Republic People's Great Khural, served as the effective president of the Mongolian People's Republic from 1954 until his death in 1972.

== Early life and career ==
Sambuu was born in 1895 in what is now Büren sum of Töv Province. The son of a shepherd and cattle farmer, he became a clerk in local and provincial administrations at age 16. Following the Mongolian Revolution of 1921, he joined the Mongolian People's Party (MPP) and secured an important position in the Ministry of Finance in 1922. Aligning himself with the leftist faction of the party early on, Sambuu supported the purges and executions of both Dogsomyn Bodoo in 1922 and party leader Soliin Danzan in 1924. In 1926 he was named chief accountant for state receipts and expenditures and called for a tax hike on foreigners (i.e. Chinese merchants) to reduce their control of the economy.

In 1928, the Seventh Party Congress ushered in the “Leftist Period.” Sambuu supported and played an active role in implementing Soviet backed leftist policies of more rapid collectivization, land expropriation, and persecution of the Buddhist Church. He was dispatched to Arkhangai Province in 1930 to oversee collectivization of herders and confiscation of property belonging to nobles and the Buddhist Church. When violent uprisings in western Mongolia forced the curtailment of such policies in 1932, Sambuu deftly avoided the political blowback for the debacle that felled many of the party's most extreme leftists including Ölziin Badrakh, Zolbingiin Shijee and Prime Minister Tsengeltiin Jigjidjav. Between 1932 and 1936 Sambuu went on to work in provincial party administrative offices in Dundgovi, and Ömnögovi Provinces. In 1936, he led a department in the Ministry of Agriculture and Livestock.

== Diplomat ==
=== Ambassador to the USSR ===
Although he had no prior diplomatic experience (he had never traveled abroad), Sambuu was appointed Ambassador of the Mongolian People's Republic to Moscow in 1937, where he managed Mongolia's most important bilateral relationship. Sambuu had been an early supporter of Soviet leadership in Mongolian affairs (he often referred to the Soviet Union as Mongolia's "big brother") and was viewed by Mongolia's supreme leader Khorloogiin Choibalsan as someone he could depend on to carry out the party line without deviation. Throughout World War II Sambuu played a key role in funneling Mongolian monetary and material assistance to the Soviet Red Army fighting German troops. He also took a keen interest in supporting Mongolian students (including future leader Yumjaagiin Tsedenbal) who were studying in Russia, seeing them as the key to Mongolia's future, and cultivated many of Mongolia's future diplomats. However, Sambuu was also his country's chief diplomatic representative during the Stalinist repressions in Mongolia during which several of Mongolia's top leaders were arrested, transported to the Soviet Union, and executed, many at the Butovo firing range just outside Moscow.

=== Advice to Herdsman ===
Sambuu published his most popular work Advice to Herdsmen (Малчдад өгөх зөвлөгөө) in 1945. The book contained advice on herding that Sambuu had collected from experts and local herders. It combined effective practices drawn from traditional folklore and modern scientific methods. The work was widely admired in Mongolia and was reprinted in 1999 and 2000 when Mongolian herders suffered through difficult winters.

=== Ambassador to the DPRK ===
Returning to Mongolia with a heightened reputation from his wartime work with the Soviets and Advice to Herdsmen, Sambuu was appointed Deputy Ministry of Foreign Affairs in 1946. From 1950 to 1952 he served as Ambassador to Pyongyang (DPRK) during the height of the Korean War. From 1952 to 1954 he was Deputy Minister of Foreign Affairs as well as (from 1953 to 1954) Vice Chairman of the Mongolian-Soviet Friendship Society.

== President of Mongolia ==
In 1951, Sambuu was elected to the Great People's Khural and on July 7, 1954 was named Chairman of the Presidium of the Great People's Khural (the largely ceremonial position of titular head of state or President of Mongolia - a position he would hold until his death). From 1954 Sambuu served concurrently in the Central Committee and as a member of the Politburo of the Central Committee of the MPRP. Sambuu died of cancer on May 21, 1972 at the age of 76 and was given a state funeral.

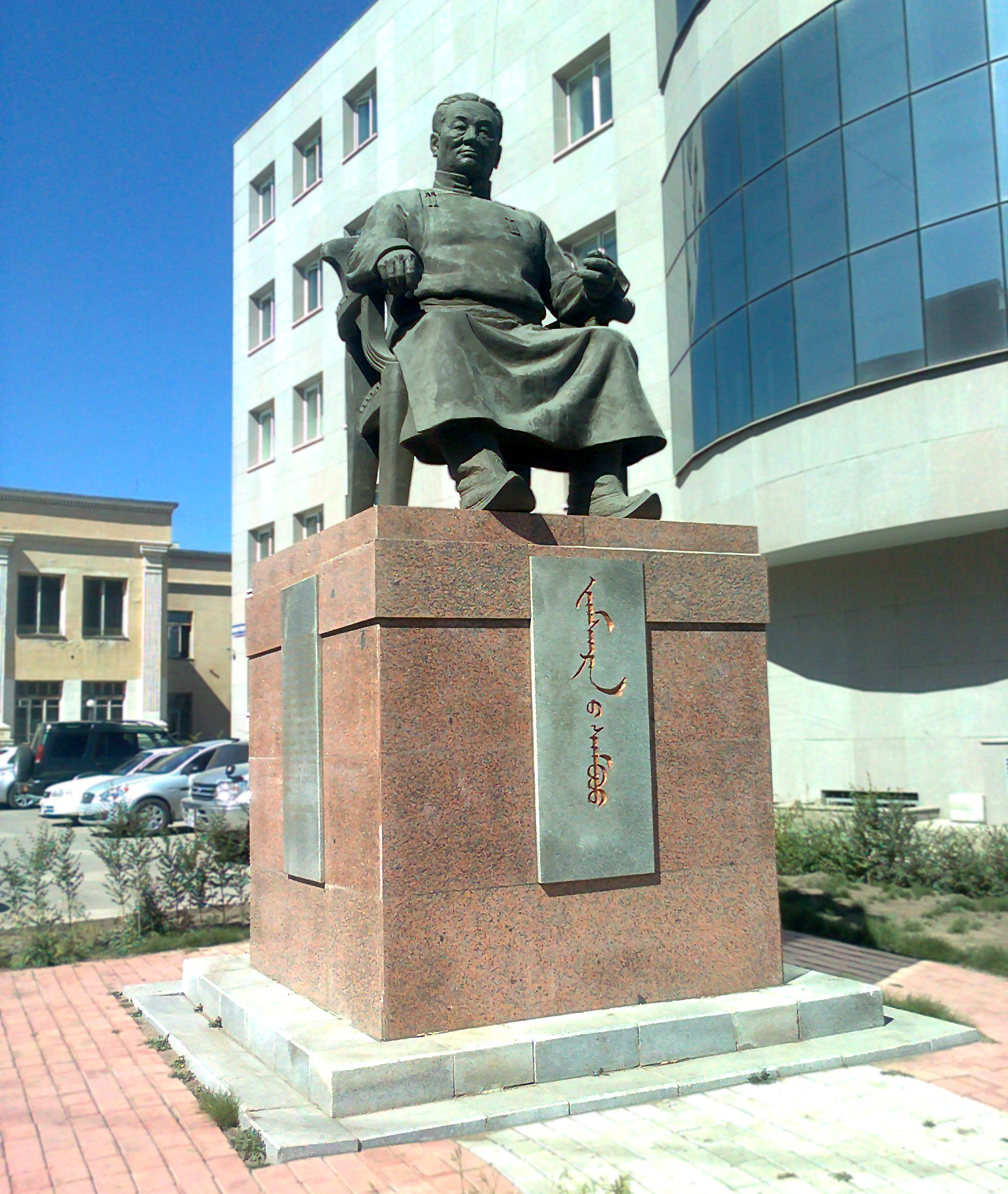
Statue of Jamsrangiin Sambuu in Ulaanbaatar.

=== Books ===
In addition to Advice to Herders, Sambuu also wrote On the Question of Religion and Lamas (Шашин ба ламн нарын асуудалд) in 1961, and his autobiography From Life's Path (Амьдралын замналаас), published in two parts in 1965 and 1970.

=== Awards ===
He was awarded the Order of Sükhbaatar medal four times, the Soviet Order of the Red Banner of Labour twice, the Order of the Polar Star as well as the Order of Lenin and the Lenin Peace Prize in 1966. On 20 April 1968, he was awarded the Order of the Yugoslav Great Star.

Political offices
| Preceded by Sükhbaataryn Yanjmaa | President of Mongolia; July 7, 1954 – May 20, 1972 | Succeeded by Tsagaanlamyn Dügersüren (acting) |
