= Nyamyn Jagvaral =

Mongolian politician, statesman, economist, and academic

- Нямын Жагварал
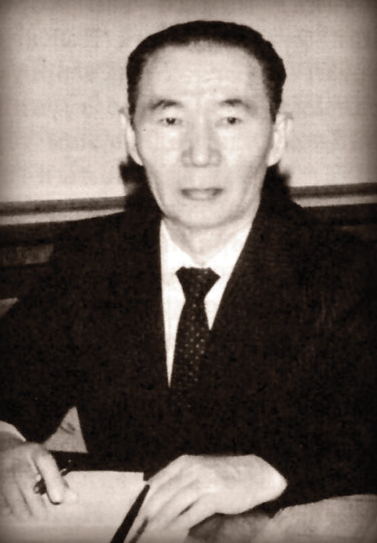

Chairman of the Presidium of the People's Great Khural
- Acting
- In office 23 August 1984 – 12 December 1984
- Preceded by: Yumjaagiin Tsedenbal
- Succeeded by: Jambyn Batmönkh

Personal details
- Born: 4 May 1919 Dornogovi Province, Mongolia
- Died: 19 September 1987 (aged 68) Mongolia
- Party: Mongolian People's Revolutionary Party

Nyamyn Jagvaral (Mongolian: Нямын Жагварал; 4 May 1919 – 19 September 1987) was a Mongolian politician, statesman, economist, and academic who, as First Vice-Chairmen of the Presidium of the People's Great Khural, was acting Chairman (titular head of state) of the Mongolian People's Republic from August 23 to December 12, 1984 after the forced resignation of Yumjaagiin Tsedenbal for political and health reasons.

== Biography ==
Jagvaral was born in 1919 in present-day Dornogovi Province. In 1938 he graduated from the Communist University of the Toilers of the East in Moscow and then 1938 to 1939 he taught high-school. He joined the Mongolian People's Revolutionary Party (MPRP) in 1939 and from 1939 to 1940 headed the High School Party cadres. Between 1940 and 1945 he attended the Moscow Institute of Oriental Studies (the first Mongolian citizen to do so) receiving his Ph.D. in Economics in 1945. From 1945 to 1946 he was Deputy Chairman and Chairman of the State Planning Committee. From 1946 to 1953 he served as Vice-Chairman, Member of the Central Committee of the Revolutionary Party and in 1954 he was elected Deputy of the Great People's Khural. He was named the minister of agriculture in 1957 (until 1961) and concurrently the Deputy Chairman of the Council of Ministers. In 1960 he became a member of the Political Bureau of the Central Committee of the MPRP and in 1963 he became Secretary of the MPRP Central Committee. In 1961 he was named Academician of the Mongolian People's Republic.

Jagvaral became acting Chairman of the People's Great Khural (and thereby acting chief of state) upon the forced retirement of Yumjaagiin Tsedenbal in August 1984. Tsedenbal had been removed in a Soviet-sponsored move allegedly on the account of his old age and mental weakness but at least partly because of his opposition to the process of Sino-Soviet rapprochement. Jambyn Batmönkh became the prime minister and general secretary of the MPRP and would assume the position of Chairmen of the Presidium of the People's Great Khural in December 1984.

Political offices
Preceded by Yumjaagiin Tsedenbal	President of Mongolia (acting); August 23, 1984 – December 12, 1984	Succeeded by Jambyn Batmönkh
