= De facto leader of the GDR =

De facto leader of the German Democratic Republic

De facto leader of the German Democratic Republic
- Logo of the SED and Emblems of the GDR

- Flag of the SED and Flags of the GDR

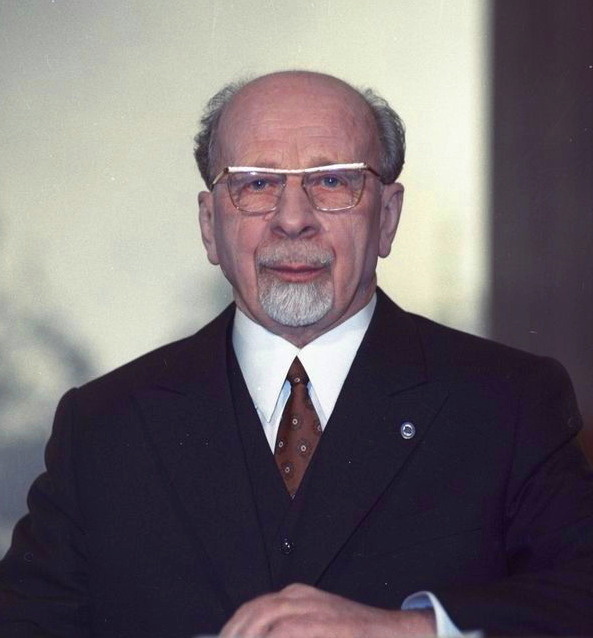
- Longest in role Walter Ulbricht; 7 October 1949 – 3 May 1971
- Type: 1949–1950: De facto leader of the Socialist Unity Party (De facto Party leader) 1950–1989: General Secretary/First Secretary/General Secretary of the Socialist Unity Party (Party leader and between 1971 and 1976 De facto Head of State) 1989: Secretary of the Central Committee 1989: General Secretary of the Socialist Unity Party (Party leader) 1989: Chairman of the State Council (Head of State) or No Position 1989–1990: Chairman of the Council of Ministers (Head of Government)
- Status: Informal term for the most important political figure of the German Democratic Republic (Note: The de facto leader was not a formal position nor an office unto itself.)
- Reports to: German Economic Commission under the Soviet Military Administration in Germany (7 October 1949–10 October 1949) German Economic Commission (disputed) (Note: Sources about the disestablishment date of the DWK, name different dates like 7 October 1949 or 11/12 October 1949.)and Soviet Control Commission (10 October 1949–11/12 October 1949) Soviet Control Commission (11/12 October 1949–28 May 1953) High Commission of the USSR in Germany (28 May 1953–22 September 1955) Embassy of the USSR in the GDR (22 September 1955–c. 25 October 1989)
- Formation: October 7, 1949; 77 years ago
- First holder: Walter Ulbricht
- Final holder: Hans Modrow
- Abolished: April 12, 1990; 36 years ago
- Unofficial names: Top East German Leader; East German leader Leader of the GDR
- Deputy: Unofficial number-two man in the SED leadership/Deputy: Karl Schirdewan; Willi Stoph (disputed); Erich Honecker; Willi Stoph (disputed); Paul Verner; Konrad Naumann; Günter Mittag (disputed); Egon Krenz; Günter Schabowski

The de facto leader of the German Democratic Republic (1949–1990) was not always the titular head of government or head of state, but was often the general secretary of the Socialist Unity Party.

== Development ==
=== Walter Ulbricht era (1949–1971) ===
From the establishment of the German Democratic Republic on 7 October 1949, the Socialist Unity Party (SED) had a monopoly on power, which meant that the party leader held the highest position in the country. While Wilhelm Pieck and Otto Grotewohl were the joint chairmen of the Socialist Unity Party and thus the de jure party leaders, the de facto leader of the SED and thus the GDR was Walter Ulbricht. On 25 July 1950, Ulbricht became the sole de jure party leader of the SED as general secretary (renamed as first secretary in 1953). In this position, Ulbricht continued to rule the country until 3 May 1971.

=== Erich Honecker era (1971–1989) ===
On 3 May 1971, Secretary of the Central Committee Erich Honecker won the power struggle against Ulbricht and became the new first secretary of the SED (changed back to general secretary in 1976), and thus the new de facto leader of the GDR.

On 7 July 1989, Honecker was hospitalized after gallbladder complications. He left the hospital on 12 July 1989, however from then on nothing was heard of him until 26 September 1989, except for one occasion on 14 August 1989. During this period was still gravely ill after his first hospital stay, and took a vacation to recuperate. He was readmitted to hospital, but left it again, and then finally reappeared on 26 September 1989. During this period, other people took over the leadership. On 24 July 1989 and 14 September 1989, it was reported that Egon Krenz was in charge since Honecker was in hospital, however later it came out that Secretary of the Central Committee Günter Mittag was in charge rather than Egon Krenz.

On 26 September 1989, Honecker reappeared and was in charge again; however this period of leadership was short-lived: on 17 October 1989, in a session of the politburo most members embraced the removal of Honecker, a day later on 18 October 1989, Honecker was ousted by other party members, following protests which demanded reforms. Later it was reported that Honecker did not understood what had happened.

=== Egon Krenz era (1989) ===
On 18 October 1989, when Honecker was ousted, Egon Krenz became the new general secretary and thus the new de facto leader. Under his leadership, the SED officially gave up its power monopoly on 1 December 1989, although Krenz continued as general secretary until 3 December 1989, however some sources say he was for two more days the de facto leader.

=== Hans Modrow era (1989–1990) ===
On 5 December 1989, Egon Krenz was succeeded by the Chairman of the Council of Ministers Hans Modrow. He was the de facto leader of the GDR until 12 April 1990, when he was succeeded as Chairman of the Council of Ministers by Lothar de Maizière as Minister-President. He was the first and last legitimately elected Minister-President.

== Aftermath ==
On 18 March 1990, the first free elections were held in the GDR, and on 12 April 1990 Lothar de Maizière became the first and last legitimately elected minister-president.

== Soviet Union oversight of the leadership of the GDR ==
Besides the native de facto leadership, the Soviet Union oversaw the leadership of the German Democratic Republic and allegedly interfered in the domestic affairs of the GDR through various bodies, like the Soviet Military Administration in Germany, the German Economic Commission, (Note: Sources about the disestablishment date of the DWK, name different dates like 7 October 1949 or 11/12 October 1949.) the Soviet Control Commission, the High Commission of the USSR in Germany and the Embassy of the USSR in the GDR. One person who served as head of one of these bodies was Vasily Chuikov, who was described as "Front Man" and as "Top Man of East Germany". While the GDR was until 1990 considered to be a satellite state, it had already been announced in July of the preceding year that the Soviet Union would not interfere in the GDR's domestic affairs. This became official with the Sinatra Doctrine, which was proclaimed on 25 October 1989. Vyacheslav Kochemasov was the last Soviet official to serve as Ambassador to the GDR during the period where the Soviet Union uphold the Brezhnev Doctrine.

== List of de facto leaders ==
No.	Portrait	Name (Birth–Death)	Term of office			Party	Deputy
No.	Portrait	Name (Birth–Death)	Took office	Left office	Time in office	Party	Deputy
1		Walter Ulbricht (1893–1973) (Note: In the beginning of 1971, Honecker took over some aspects of Ulbricht's work, when the power struggle of both was still ongoing.)	7 October 1949	3 May 1971	21 years, 208 days	Socialist Unity Party	Karl Schirdewan; Erich Honecker
2		Erich Honecker (1912–1994)	3 May 1971	18 October 1989	18 years, 168 days	Socialist Unity Party	Paul Verner; Konrad Naumann; Egon Krenz
–		Günter Mittag (1926–1994) (Note: Between 7 July 1989 and 26 September 1989, Honecker was still seen as the leader of the German Democratic Republic, however Mittag was in charge, due to Honecker's illness.)	7 July 1989	26 September 1989	81 days	Socialist Unity Party	Egon Krenz
3		Egon Krenz (born 1937)	18 October 1989	5 December 1989	48 days	Socialist Unity Party	Günter Schabowski None
4		Hans Modrow (1928–2023)	5 December 1989	12 April 1990	128 days	Socialist Unity Party Party of Democratic Socialism–Socialist Unity Party	None

== See also ==
- List of leaders of the Soviet Union
- Paramount leader
- List of de facto leaders of the Mongolian People's Republic
- List of de facto leaders of the People's Republic of Kampuchea
- Supreme Leader (North Korean title)
- Supreme Leader of Democratic Kampuchea
- Führer
