= Mongolian People's Republic =

Mongolian state from 1924 to 1992

Mongolian People's Republic Бүгд Найрамдах Монгол Ард Улс Bügd Nairamdakh Mongol Ard Uls (Note: Mongolian Latin was used before 1941 and is now used unofficially as an auxiliary alphabet alongside Mongolian Cyrillic and the Traditional script.) ᠪᠦᠭᠦᠳᠡ ᠨᠠᠢᠢᠷᠠᠮᠳᠠᠬᠤᠮᠣᠩᠭᠣᠯ ᠠᠷᠠᠳ ᠤᠯᠤᠰ
- 1924–1992
- Flag (1945–1992) Emblem (1960–1992)
- Motto: Орон бүрийн пролетари нар нэгдэгтүн! Oron büriin prolietari nar negdegtün! "Workers of the world, unite!"
- Anthem: Монгол Интернационал "Mongol Internationale" (1924–1950) Бүгд Найрамдах Монгол Ард Улсын сүлд дуулал Bügd Nairamdakh Mongol Ard Ulsiin süld duulal "State Anthem of the Mongolian People's Republic" (1950–1992)
- Mongolian People's Republic in 1989
- Status: Satellite state of the Soviet Union (1924–1990) and member of Comecon
- Capital and largest city: Ulaanbaatar
- Official languages: Mongolian
- Religion: State atheism (official)
- Demonym: Mongolian (Note: "Mongolian" denotes nationality, which includes minorities such as Kazakhs and Tuvans, while "Mongol" indicates ethnicity.)
- Government: Communist state (1924–1990); Constitutional republic (1990–1992)
- De facto leader
  - 1939–1952: Khorloogiin Choibalsan
  - 1952–1954: Yumjaagiin Tsedenbal
  - 1954–1958: Collective leadership (Dashiin Damba and Yumjaagiin Tsedenbal)
  - 1958–1984: Yumjaagiin Tsedenbal
  - 1984–1990: Jambyn Batmönkh
  - 1990: Gombojavyn Ochirbat
- Head of state
  - 1924 (first): Navaandorjiin Jadambaa
  - 1990–1992 (last): Punsalmaagiin Ochirbat
- Head of government
  - 1924–1928 (first): Balingiin Tserendorj
  - 1990–1992 (last): Dashiin Byambasüren
- Legislature: People's Great Khural
- Historical era: Interwar period · World War II · Cold War
  - People's Revolution: 1 March 1921
  - 1924 Constitution: 26 November 1924
  - Independence referendum: 20 October 1945
  - Admitted to United Nations: 27 October 1961
  - Coup d'etat: 23 August 1984
  - First democratic elections: 29 June 1990
  - Communist state abolished: 12 February 1992

Area
  - Total: 1,564,116 km^{2} (603,909 sq mi)

Population
  - 1992 estimate: 2,318,000
  - 1991 estimate: 2,202,768
- GDP (PPP): 1991 estimate
  - Total: $6.13 billion
  - Per capita: $3,183.2
- GDP (nominal): 1991 estimate
  - Total: $2.38 billion
  - Per capita: $1,099
- HDI (1992): 0.560 medium
- Currency: Tögrög (MNT)
- Time zone: UTC+7/+8
  - Summer (DST): UTC+8/+9
- ISO 3166 code: MN
Preceded by	Succeeded by
Bogd Khanate of Mongolia	Mongolia
- Today part of: Mongolia

The Mongolian People's Republic (Note: Mongolian: Бүгд Найрамдах Монгол Ард Улс (БНМАУ), romanized: Bügd Nairamdakh Mongol Ard Uls (BNMAU), pronounced [puxt nɛ́ːrəmtəχ mɔ́ɴɢəɮ art ʊɮs (pe̝‿e̝ɴ‿e̝m‿a‿ʊ)]; Kazakh: Моңғолия Халық Республикасы (МХР), romanized: Moñğolia Halyq Respublikasy (MHR), pronounced [moɴʁólʲɪjə χɑɫə́q rʲɪspúblʲɪkəsə (ɛm‿χɑ‿ɛr)]; Russian: Монгольская Народная Республика (МНР), romanized: Mongoljskaja Narodnaja Respublika (MNR), pronounced [mɐnˈɡolʲskəjə nɐˈrodnəjə rʲɪˈspublʲɪkə (ˌɛm‿ˌɛn‿ˈɛr)]) (MPR) was the Mongolian communist state that existed from 1924 to 1992 that self-designated first as a people's democratic state and later as a socialist state. The Mongolian People's Revolutionary Party was enshrined as the leading force of state and society; it occupied the historical region of Outer Mongolia. Geographically positioned between the Soviet Union and China, the MPR became the world's second communist state. It was the first Soviet satellite state, and remained so for its entire existence, longer than any other Soviet satellite. It is the predecessor of the modern state of Mongolia.

The state was established in 1924 following the Mongolian Revolution of 1921, which was supported by the Soviet Red Army. Under the rule of Khorloogiin Choibalsan, the government aligned closely with Soviet policies, undertaking Stalinist repressions from 1937 to 1939 that resulted in the deaths of over 20,000 people. The MPR's army fought alongside the Soviets in the 1939 Battles of Khalkhin Gol against Japan, and its independence was formally recognized by China after a 1945 referendum.

After Choibalsan's death, Yumjaagiin Tsedenbal came to power and maintained a close alliance with the Soviet Union, particularly during the Sino-Soviet split of the 1960s. His rule was marked by Soviet-guided industrialization and the complete collectivization of agriculture, mirroring the Soviet Model. This would transform the nomadic society into a developing agricultural-industrial economy. Inspired by the reforms of Mikhail Gorbachev in the Soviet Union, the 1990 Mongolian Revolution led to the resignation of the MPRP leadership, the legalization of opposition parties, and the establishment of a multi-party system. A new constitution was adopted in 1992, formally abolishing the communist state and establishing the present-day parliamentary republic, officially known as the State of Mongolia.

== History ==
From 1691, the Mongols were ruled by the Manchu-led Qing dynasty of China, during which northern and southern Mongolia became known as Outer Mongolia and Inner Mongolia, respectively. The Qing dynasty promoted Tibetan Buddhism and built monasteries, which grew rich and powerful. Its administrators also impoverished and oppressed the Mongols, and pursued colonization of Inner Mongolia in the 19th century. In the early 20th century, the implementation of the New Policies, aimed at further Qing integration of Outer Mongolia, led to anti-Manchu mutinies and uprisings. In late 1911, the Qing dynasty collapsed in the Xinhai Revolution, and Outer Mongolia declared its independence under the leadership of the 8th Jebtsundamba Khutuktu, who was named the Bogd Khan. The new state called on the Mongols of Inner Mongolia to join it, and sought international recognition. In 1912, it signed a treaty with the Russian Empire. Under the Treaty of Kyakhta of 1915, Mongolia accepted autonomy under the suzerainty of the Republic of China (ROC).

=== Revolution and early years ===
After the 1917 October Revolution and outbreak of the Russian Civil War, Mongolia was recognized by the Bolshevik government in August 1919. That November, ROC troops entered the capital and overthrew the Bogd Khan. During the Chinese occupation, Mongolian revolutionaries made contact with the Bolsheviks in Siberia, and in 1920 founded the Mongolian People's Party (MPP), led by Damdin Sükhbaatar, Khorloogiin Choibalsan, Dogsomyn Bodoo, Soliin Danzan, and others, across the border at Kyakhta. In October, White Russian cavalry under Baron Roman von Ungern-Sternberg entered Mongolia, and in February 1921 drove out the Chinese and restored the Bogd Khan. The MPP made a provisional government at its first congress on 1 March, and that July cavalry under Sükhbaatar, supported by Soviet troops, captured the capital in the Mongolian People's Revolution. Bodoo was appointed prime minister, while the Bogd Khan was allowed to remain on the throne. In November, a Mongolian delegation traveled to Soviet Russia and signed a treaty.

A split began to emerge between nationalists and communists in the MPP, whose members included lamas and nobles. In 1922, Bodoo was executed as a "counter-revolutionary". After Sükhbaatar's death in 1923, the MPP program was amended so the party could be "purged of oppressor class elements"; after the Bogd Khan's death in 1924, the search for a new incarnation was forbidden. Danzan was executed for "bourgeois tendencies" that year. The MPP declared a socialist "non-capitalist path of development", was renamed the Mongolian People's Revolutionary Party (MPRP), and joined the Comintern. The 1924 constitution founded the Mongolian People's Republic (MPR), and its capital was renamed Ulaanbaatar (meaning "red hero").

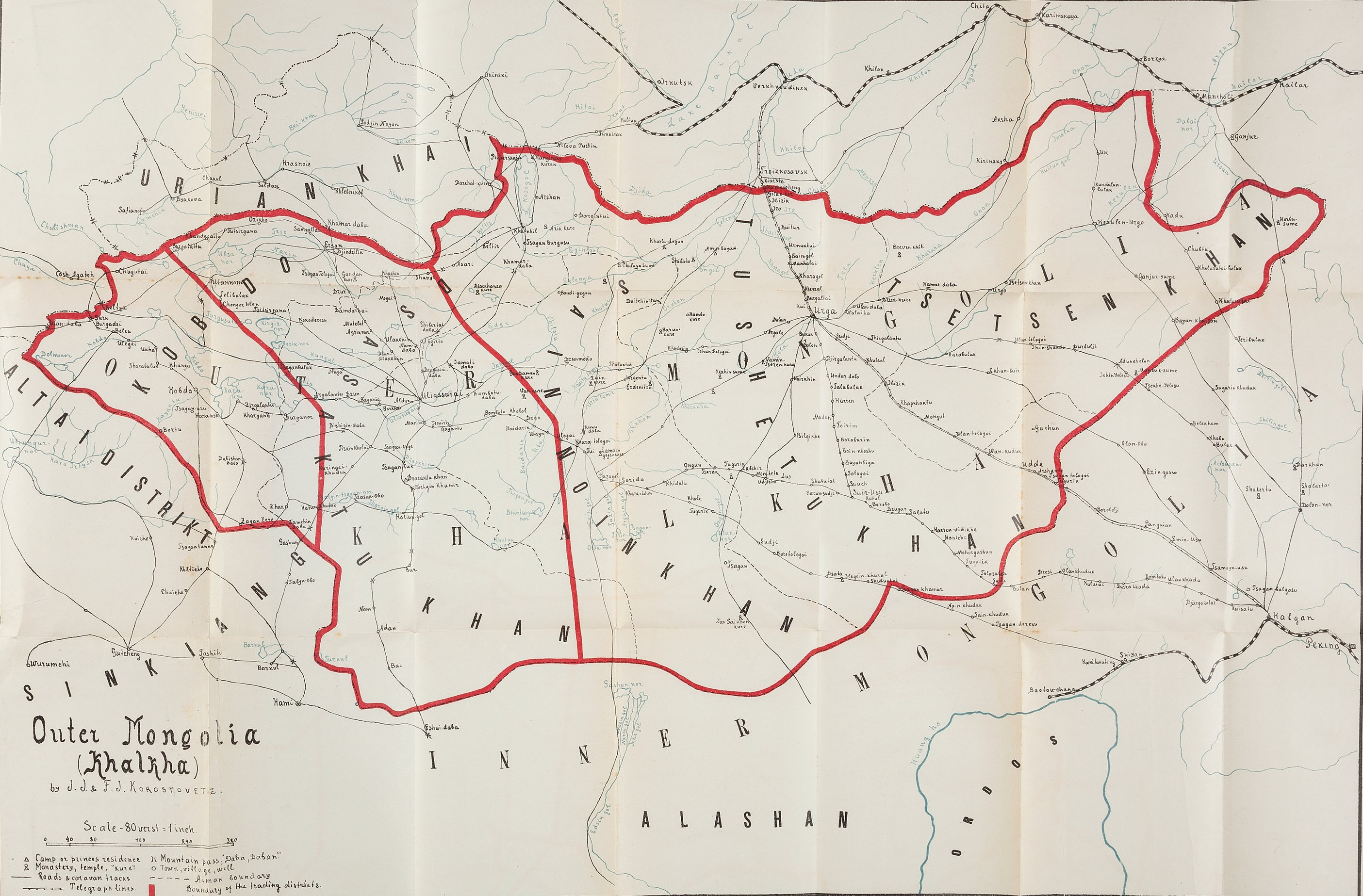
Map of the MPR in 1925

As in the Soviet Union under Joseph Stalin, Mongolian politics went through several abrupt changes of direction in the 1920s and 1930s. The initial nationalist leadership of the MPRP advanced the slogan "Get rich!" to promote business, which was opposed by the communists. The Fifth Congress in 1926 called for restriction and nationalization of private property. The Seventh Congress in 1928 denounced previous "right opportunism" (baruun opportunizm) and dismissed several leaders. In 1929, the state began expropriating monastery property and tried to force herdsmen into collective farms and communes. During 1930–1932, there were uprisings led by the lamas of several monasteries, the largest of which took place in 1932 and was brutally suppressed, and herdsmen began to slaughter their livestock or herd their animals across the border. At the direction of the Comintern, the MPRP expelled the perpetrators of the "left deviation" (züünii nugalaa) in 1932, and a "new turn" (shine ergelt) was taken by moderate leadership. Collectivization of livestock herders was completed in the 1950s (see § Economy).

From September 1937 to April 1939, Stalinist purges in Mongolia saw mass arrests of top party and state leaders, lamas, soldiers, and citizens on false charges of "counter-revolution" and spying for Japan. Some 20,000 to 35,000 Mongols were executed in Mongolia and the USSR in a campaign organized by NKVD officials and Khorloogiin Choibalsan, minister of internal affairs and commander-in-chief. Under communist repression, an estimated 17,000 monks were killed, official figures show. Prime Ministers Peljidiin Genden and Anandyn Amar, for example, were accused of counter-revolution and shot in Moscow in 1937 and 1941, respectively. Buddhist institutions were nearly all destroyed, their property appropriated, and the lamas killed or secularized. In March 1939, Choibalsan, Stalin's close ally, became premier, led a Stalinist dictatorship, and initiated further episodes of repression during his tenure.

=== World War II (1939–1945) ===
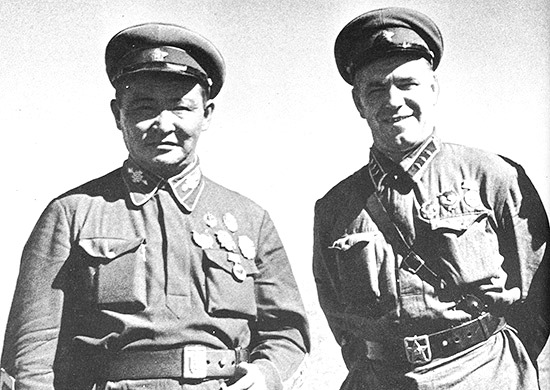
Khorloogiin Choibalsan (left), who led the MPR from 1939 to 1952, and Georgy Zhukov at Khalkhin Gol in 1939

In 1931–1932, the Empire of Japan invaded Manchuria and set up the puppet state of Manchukuo. In 1934, Mongolia and the USSR made a verbal agreement on mutual aid in case of invasion, followed by a formal agreement in 1936. In May 1939, Japanese forces first skirmished with Soviet and Mongolian troops at the Battle of Khalkhin Gol. That July, Japan launched an unsuccessful attack across the river, and in August, Soviet and Mongolian troops under General (later Marshal) Georgy Zhukov, encircled and destroyed the Japanese forces. In April 1941, the USSR and Japan concluded a neutrality pact. That June, Nazi Germany invaded the Soviet Union in Operation Barbarossa. Mongolia did not join the war directly, but provided the Soviets with volunteers and materiel, and the country's economy was marshalled to support the war effort. Yumjaagiin Tsedenbal, MPRP general secretary and second to Choibalsan, rose to prominence, inspecting aid deliveries and touring the Eastern Front as a Mongolian People's Army (MPA) lieutenant general.

At the Yalta Conference in February 1945, the "Big Three" Allied powers (the United States, the United Kingdom, and the Soviet Union) decided the terms of the planned Soviet entry into the war against Japan, which included a recognition of the "status quo" in Mongolia (which was still internationally recognized as part of China). In August 1945, the Soviet Union used Mongolia as one base for its Manchurian Strategic Offensive Operation. The build-up brought 650,000 Soviet troops and large amounts of equipment to the country; the MPA played a limited role. The ROC, headed by Chiang Kai-shek, was persuaded to recognize Mongolian independence in the 1945 Sino-Soviet Treaty after Stalin promised to refrain from supporting the Chinese Communist Party (CCP) in the Chinese Civil War. In keeping with the treaty, a successful independence referendum was held in Mongolia in October 1945.

=== Cold War politics (1945–1984) ===
Following the CCP's victory in the Chinese Civil War and its proclamation of the People's Republic of China (PRC) in 1949, Mongolia transferred its recognition from the ROC to the PRC. The 1950 Sino-Soviet Treaty guaranteed Outer Mongolia's independence, but ended Choibalsan's hopes for reuniting it with Inner Mongolia. Mao Zedong privately hoped for Outer Mongolia's reintegration with China, and he was rebuffed by Soviet leadership after raising the question in 1949 and again in 1954, the year after Stalin's death. In 1956, after Nikita Khrushchev's denunciation of Stalin, Chinese leaders attempted to present Mongolia's independence as one of Stalin's mistakes. The Soviet response was that the Mongols were free to decide their own fate. Choibalsan died of cancer in Moscow in 1952, and was replaced as prime minister by Tsedenbal. Unlike his predecessor, Tsedenbal was enthusiastic about incorporating Mongolia as a constituent republic of the Soviet Union. This proposal was met with strenuous opposition from other MPRP members, and was subsequently abandoned.

Mongolia's foreign relations outside of the USSR and PRC were initially limited to the Soviet satellites of the Eastern Bloc. It was recognized by India in 1955, and that year attempted to join the United Nations (UN), but its request was vetoed by the ROC (now based in Taiwan) which had withdrawn its recognition of Mongolia's independence and renewed its territorial claim on the country. Mongolia eventually became a member state of the UN in 1961, after the Soviet Union threatened to veto the admission of the newly decolonized states of Africa if the ROC again used its veto. Mongolia established diplomatic relations with its first Western country, the United Kingdom, in 1963, but its diplomatic relations with the United States were not established until 1987, near the end of the Cold War.

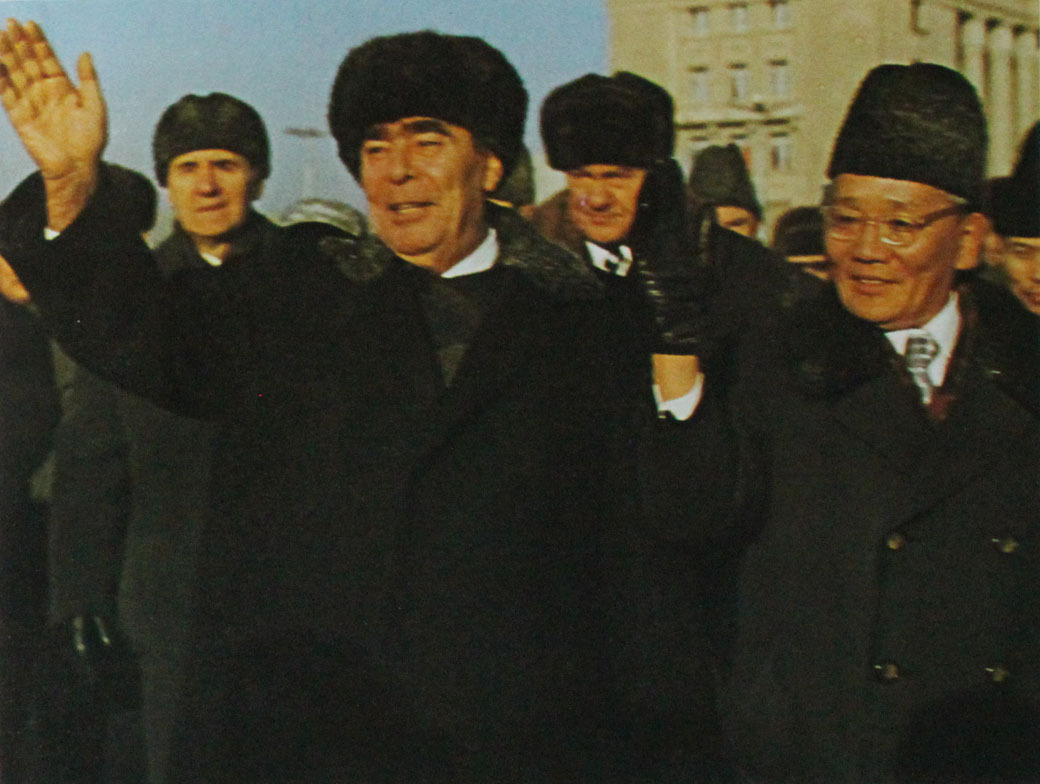
Yumjaagiin Tsedenbal (right) receiving Leonid Brezhnev (left) during his state of visit to the MPR in 1974.

In the 1950s, relations between the MPR and the PRC improved considerably. The Trans-Mongolian Railway, which opened in 1949 and linked Moscow with Ulaanbaatar via the Trans-Siberian Railway, was extended to the Chinese border and linked with Beijing in 1955. China provided economic support to Mongolia by building factories and apartment blocks, and thousands of Chinese laborers were involved in the projects until they were withdrawn in 1962 in an unsuccessful bid to pressure Mongolia to break with the USSR during the Sino-Soviet split. A military build-up on the Sino-Mongolian border began in 1963, and in 1966, the Soviet Union and Mongolia signed a new mutual aid treaty with a secret annex allowing the stationing of Soviet troops and missiles in the country. The Soviet Union increased its investment in the Mongolian economy on a "fraternal" or "elder brother–younger brother" (akh düü) basis.

Tsedenbal, a friend of Soviet leader Leonid Brezhnev, sent many of his political rivals into internal exile during his leadership, including Dashiin Damba in 1959, Daramyn Tömör-Ochir in 1962, Tsogt-Ochiryn Lookhuuz and others in 1964, Bazaryn Shirendev in 1982, and Sampilyn Jalan-Aajav in 1983. After Jamsrangiin Sambuu's death, Tsedenbal was elected in his place as chairman of the presidium of the People's Great Khural (head of state) in 1974, and handed the premiership to Jambyn Batmönkh. Tsedenbal was expelled from office by Batmönkh and the MPRP Politburo in August 1984, on the pretext of "old age and mental incapacity" in a move with full Soviet backing, and he retired to Moscow; Batmönkh took over as the party leader and head of state.

=== Reforms and end (1984–1992) ===
After Mikhail Gorbachev became leader of the Soviet Union in March 1985, he began implementing policies of perestroika (restructuring the economy) and glasnost (openness and accountability); the atmosphere of reform prompted the same policies in Mongolia, known as öörchlön baiguulalt and il tod. Unlike Tsedenbal, Batmönkh agreed with the Soviet leadership on normalizing Sino-Soviet relations; between 1987 and 1992, Soviet troops were withdrawn from Mongolia, which enabled both countries to normalize relations with China. In 1988, the MPRP newspaper Ünen urged accelerated reforms to overcome the party's "dogmatic interpretation of socialism", declared that "authoritarianism and intellectual indolence" undermined national "renewal", and described Tsedenbal as "willful and unprincipled". In that same year, Mongolia participated in the Seoul Olympic Games, making its final appearance as a communist nation. In 1989, Mongolian newspapers called for an "objective and realistic evaluation" of Mongolian–Soviet relations.

On 10 December 1989 (Human Rights Day), young people began demonstrating for political freedom in Ulaanbaatar. In January 1990, anti-MPRP rallies were held by student and social democratic organizations; their spokesman was Sanjaasürengiin Zorig. After more demonstrations and a hunger strike, the MPRP leadership resigned in March, and Batmönkh was replaced as head of state and general secretary. Tsedenbal was expelled from the MPRP. In May, the constitution was amended by the People's Great Khural, which removed references to the MPRP's "guiding role" in society, legalized opposition parties, and established the office of president and a standing legislature (the State Little Khural). At Mongolia's first multiparty elections in July, the MPRP gained majorities in both bodies. A transition to a market economy was approved, and the herding cooperatives and state farms were broken up and privatized. A new constitution, adopted in January 1992 and entering into force in February, created a unicameral State Great Khural and ended the socialist republic.

== Government and politics ==
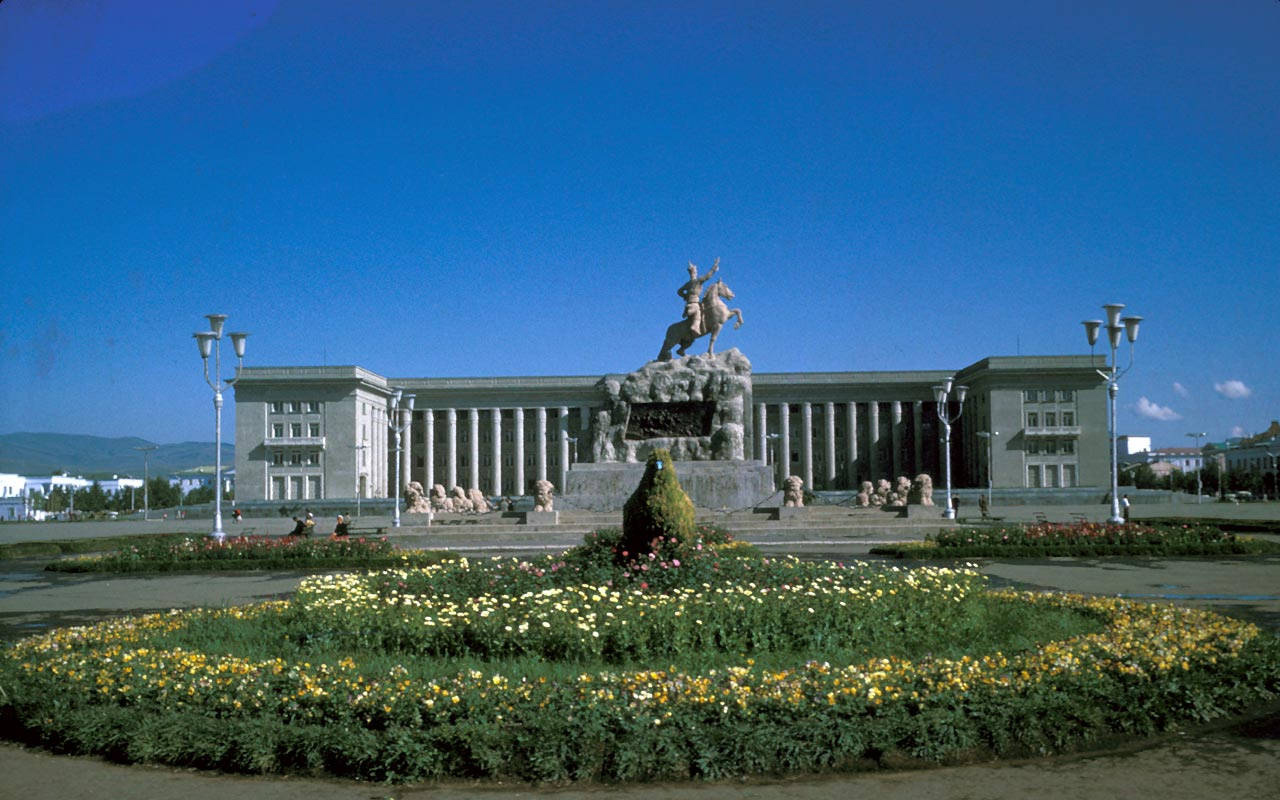
The Government Palace, housed major governmental institutions of the MPR since its completion in 1951, in Sükhbaatar Square during the 1970s.

From 1924 to 1990, the Mongolian People's Republic was a communist state ruled by the Mongolian People's Revolutionary Party (MPRP). While formally a democratic republic with regular elections, in reality, its elections were pre-decided and it was ruled alternately between oligarchy and one-man rule.

Before 1928, the leader of the MPRP was the chairman (darga) of its Central Committee (töv khoroo), which had a presidium (tergüülegchid) of about 10 members representing the core party leadership. Between 1928 and 1940, the Comintern replaced the chairman with three co-secretaries to weaken the party's ability to resist its directives. In 1940, the presidium was replaced by a political bureau (Politburo; uls töriin tovchoo), headed by a general secretary (yerönkhii nariin bichgiin darga); the title of the position was "first secretary" (negdügeer nariin bichgiin darga) from 1954 to 1981. Until 1974, the maximum leader of Mongolia was the head of government as the Chairman of the Council of Ministers (said naryn zövlöl), equivalent to a prime minister. The council oversaw cabinet-level ministries, which numbered 42 by 1981. Before it was abolished in 1951, the Little Khural, a presidium of five members (from 1927, three) was elected by the Great Khural to select the premier; its chairman was the head of state. Thereafter, the chairman of the eight-member presidium of the (People's) Great Khural became the head of state. From 1974 to 1990, the maximum leader held this position and that of party general secretary.

The Central Committee was responsible for supervising party affairs and making important policy decisions, including the appointment and removal of party and government leaders. Most of its work was done at plenary meetings, typically held twice a year. The Central Committee's membership numbered 83 in 1971, 91 in 1976 and 1981, and 85 in 1986 (in addition to 55, 61, 71, and 65 non-voting candidate members in the same years). Its members were elected at party congresses; the first congress was held in 1921 and followed by one every year from 1923 to 1928, involving relatively frank debate. From 1930 to 1960, only six congresses were held (in 1930, 1934, 1940, 1947, 1954, and 1958), ratifying key decisions which had been made in advance. From 1961 to 1986, the congresses were purely symbolic events, held every five years to coincide with those of the Soviet Union and the creation of five-year plans. The next MPRP congress was due for 1991, but the protests of 1990 forced an extraordinary congress in April 1990, which claimed a membership of 94,750.

From 1990 to 1992, the head of government was a prime minister (yerönkhii said) and the head of state was a president (yerönkhiilögch), elected indirectly by the People's Great Khural. The People's Great Khural also elected the 50-member State Little Khural, whose seat apportionment reflected proportional representation of the total ballot for parties in the legislative election; three-quarters of its members were required to be People's Great Khural deputies.

=== Constitutions ===
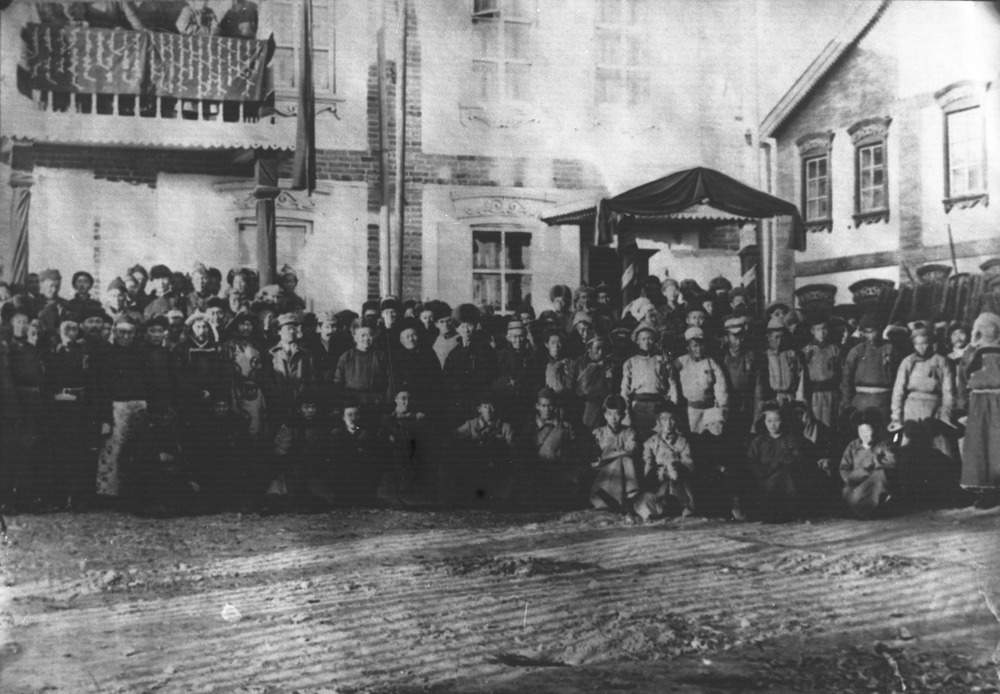
The first Great Khural in November 1924

Mongolia's first-ever constitution, adopted by the first Great Khural in November 1924, proclaimed the Mongolian People's Republic and the transfer of political power to the working people along Marxist–Leninist lines. The land, water, and mineral wealth of the country were nationalized. The constitution contained a declaration of the rights of the people, equality before the law, and suffrage at age 18 (with the exception of "feudalists" and Buddhist lamas resident in the monasteries). The soyombo symbol of Mongolian independence was adopted as the state arms.

The second constitution, adopted by the eighth Great Khural in June–July 1940, was closely modeled on the 1936 Soviet constitution. It proclaimed a state of "herdsmen, workers, and intelligentsia" taking a "non-capitalist road of development for the future transition to socialism". It added "counter-revolutionaries" to the list of disenfranchised, and declared the Mongolian People's Revolutionary Party to be the "vanguard of the working people and core of all their organizations". New state arms depicted a herdsman on horseback and the heads of a cow, sheep, goat, and camel. Amendments adopted by the ninth Great Khural in February 1949 introduced electoral reform, including a secret ballot, universal suffrage, and direct elections. In 1951, the Little Khural was abolished, and the Great Khurals were renumbered. In 1956, the Council of Ministers was restructured.

The third constitution, adopted by the fourth Great Khural in July 1960, proclaimed a state of "workers, collectivized herdsmen, and working intelligentsia" which sought to achieve the "building of socialism and in the future build a communist society"; the preamble declared the MPRP the "guiding and directing force of society and the state". The Great Khural was renamed the People's Great Khural. New state arms replaced the four animal heads with a cogwheel and ears of wheat. Amendments adopted by the 11th People's Great Khural in March and May 1990 removed references to the MPRP's "guiding" role from the preamble, instituted a presidency, and established the State Little Khural (a standing legislature). The 1992 constitution instituted liberal democracy, putting an end to Mongolia's communist state.

== Economy ==
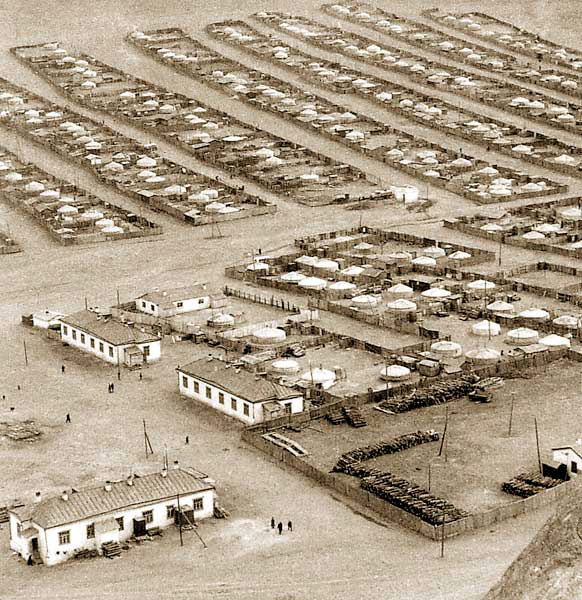
Yurt quarter in Ulaanbaatar in 1972

At the MPR's foundation in 1924, Mongolia was a nomadic subsistence society. Farming and industry were almost nonexistent, and transportation and communications were primitive. Most people were illiterate nomadic herders, and a large part of the male labor force lived in the monasteries, contributing little to the economy. Property in the form of livestock was primarily owned by aristocrats and the monasteries; ownership of the remaining sectors of the economy was dominated by Chinese and other foreigners. The MPR was thus faced with the daunting task of building a modern economy. Socialist collectivization, industrialization, and urbanization ultimately transformed the agrarian, nomadic economy of the 1920s into a developing agricultural-industrial economy by the late 1980s.

=== Collective farming ===
The first attempt to collectivize livestock herding began in 1929. By the end of 1930, nearly 30 percent of all poor and middle herdsmen's households had been forced to join collective farms (khamtral) or communes (kommun). After uprisings, these collectives were disbanded in 1932 and replaced by voluntary cooperatives (nökhörlöl) and production associations (negdel), of which there were 91 in 1940. Collectivization was achieved in the 1950s; the number of negdel, which were run by member councils, rose from 165 in 1952 to a peak of 727 in 1958, comprising 108,200 households (75 percent of the total). The number of livestock owned by negdel rose from 280,500 in 1952 to 16.9 million in 1960, by which the number of negdel had decreased to 354 after consolidation. In the 1950s, the sum (rural districts) and negdel were combined into sum-negdel, and the positions of head of the sum administration and chairman of the negdel council were merged. The national Union of Production Associations was founded in 1967 to regulate negdel membership.

The first state farms (sangiin aj akhui) were established in 1922–1923, and numbered 10 in 1940. Their numbers increased rapidly with the development of large-scale grain and vegetable farming and the introduction of industrialized methods in the 1970s and 1980s, rising to 25 by 1960 and to 52 by 1985. In 1990, there were 53 state farms and 20 specialized fodder farms (tejeeliin aj akhui), with a total of 35,200 workers. They were concentrated in the central and northern regions of the country, where natural conditions were suitable. An average state farm in 1985 had 15,400 hectares of arable land, 92 tractors, 36 grain harvesters, 26,200 head of livestock, and 500 workers. In 1990, the state farms owned 5.1 percent of the country's livestock (1.32 million head).

=== Industry and urbanization ===
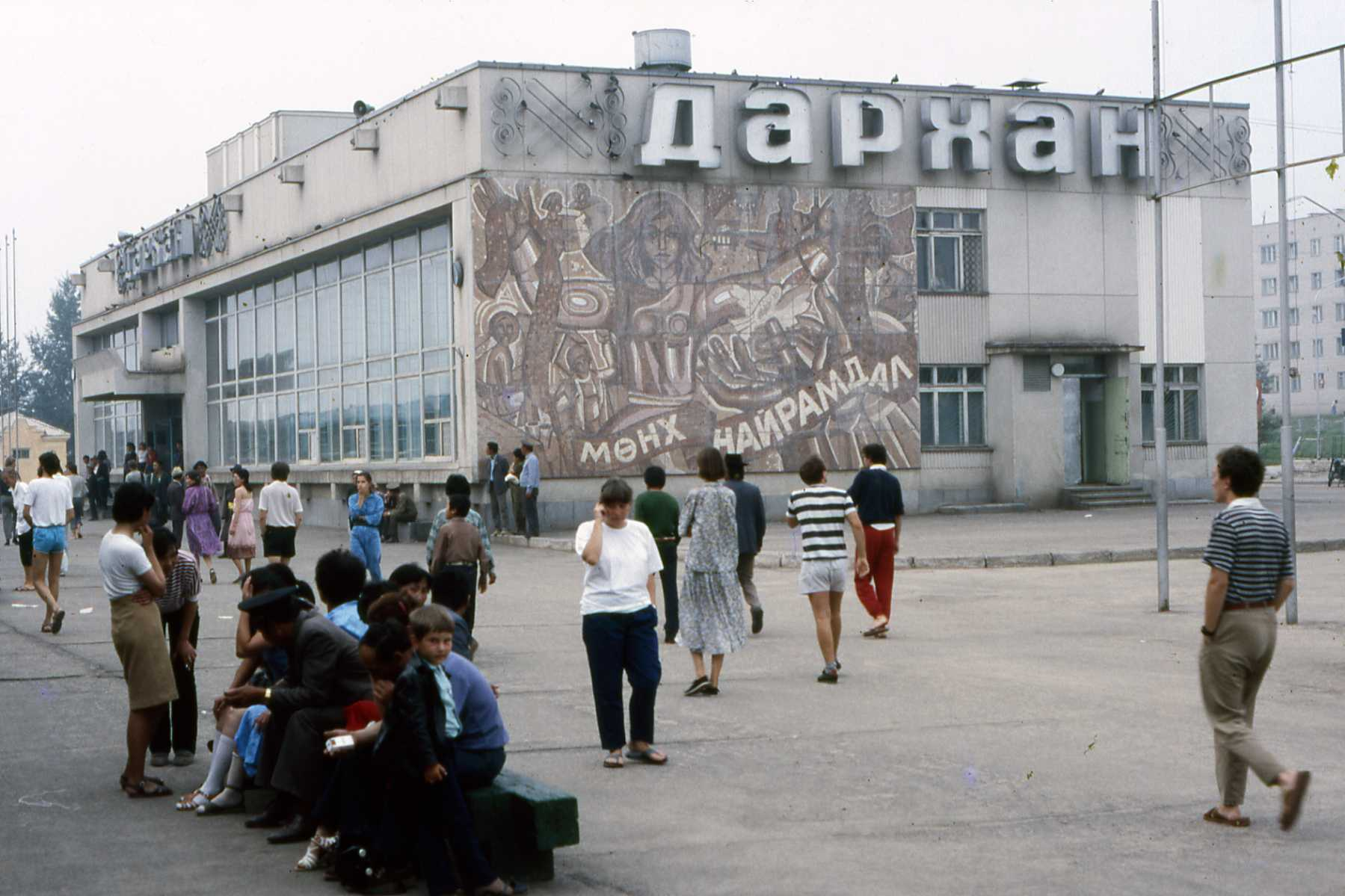
Darkhan-1 Railway Station in 1985

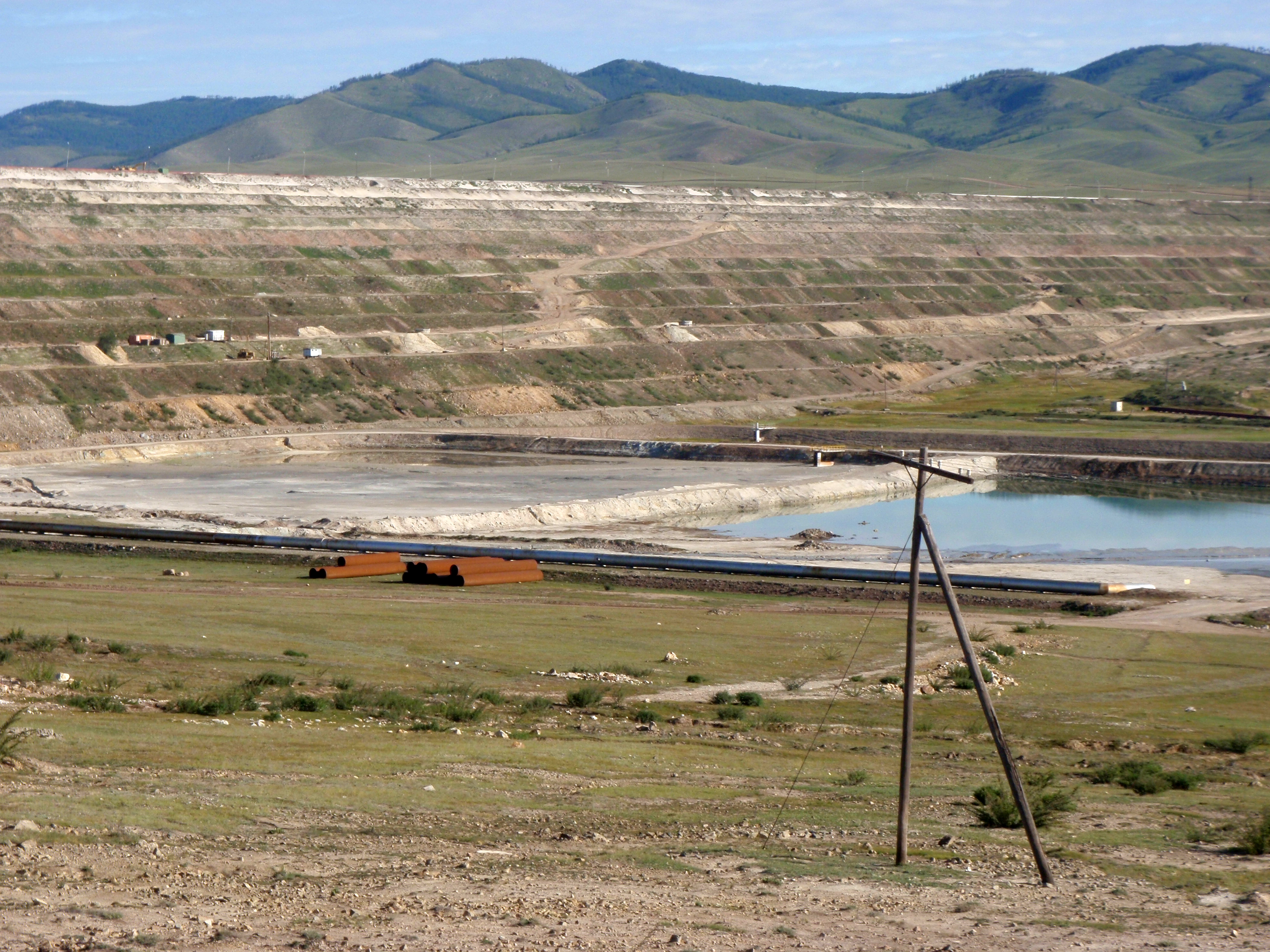
Copper mine at Erdenet in 2009

After a failed attempt in 1931–1935, the government launched eight five-year plans (and one three-year plan) in the period between 1948 and 1990, with the goal of rapidly developing agriculture and industry: 1948–1952 (first), 1953–1957 (second), 1958–1960 (the three-year plan); 1961–1965 (third), 1966–1970 (fourth), 1971–1975 (fifth); 1976–1980 (sixth), 1981–1985 (seventh), and 1986–1990 (eighth). Mongolia first attended a meeting of the Council for Mutual Economic Assistance (Comecon) in 1958 as an observer, and became a member in June 1962. It received large amounts of economic, financial, and technical assistance through the council from the USSR and Eastern Europe, in the forms of credits, advisers, and joint ventures.

In 1961, the manufacturing town of Darkhan was founded on the Trans-Mongolian Railway, north of Ulaanbaatar. In 1973, Erdenet was founded on a branch railway west of Darkhan to host the Erdenet Mining Corporation, a joint Mongolian–Soviet enterprise and one of the world's largest copper mines. Both towns, which are today Mongolia's second and third largest, were built in previously uninhabited areas and gained modern power stations, high-rise housing, schools, hospitals, and shops. Industrial development of cities was paralleled by small-scale urbanization of rural communities. Some 300 small permanent settlements were built with a school, clinic, shop, administrative office, police station, and electricity.

Mongolia has industrial reserves of coal, copper, fluorite, and iron ore as well as numerous deposits of gold, silver, zinc, lead, tin, tungsten, and other precious and rare metals. The first modern coal mine was built at Nalaikh, near Ulaanbaatar, in the 1930s and linked to the capital by a narrow-gauge railway line. The development of large-scale open-pit mining at Sharyngol near Darkhan and Baganuur, east of Ulaanbaatar, made the Nalaikh mine obsolete. Mongolia had no manufacturing industries before the building of the Ulaanbaatar industrial combine in the 1930s; there were no large-scale developments until the building of Darkhan and Erdenet in the 1960s and 1970s, which was accompanied by efforts to modernize provincial towns such as Choibalsan and Sükhbaatar. The main industries were mining, electricity generation, production of building materials, and processing of livestock produce (meat, wool, and hides) into semi-finished goods, foodstuffs, and consumer goods.

Industry accounted for 7 percent of Mongolia's net material product (NMP) in 1950 and increased to 35 percent in 1985. Trade increased from 10 percent to 26 percent; agriculture, including herding, declined from 68 percent to 20 percent. In 1960, 61 percent of the employed worked in the agricultural sector, decreasing to 33 percent by 1985. GDP figures for Mongolia record growth throughout the 1980s; as late as 1988, the annual increase in GDP amounted to 5.1 percent. In the late 1980s, the stagnation of the economy and the example of perestroika in the Soviet Union led Mongolian leaders to undertake a program of reform, which developed the economy in a market direction, which ultimately led to the end of the communist state and the turn to capitalism.

=== Banking and trade ===
The national Bank of Mongolia (Mongolbank) was founded in June 1924 as the Mongolian Trade and Industry Bank, which held yanchaan (silver dollars). In December 1925, it began issuing Mongolia's own currency, the tögrög ('round'), in silver coins of one tögrög subdivided into möngö. It became the sole legal currency in 1928. The bank was transferred to the Mongolian government in 1935, and renamed the State Bank of the Mongolian People's Republic in 1954. Circulation of the tögrög was strictly controlled by the MPR government with Soviet backing, and its foreign exchange rate was artificially fixed. In the 1960s, for example, it was valued by the State Bank at a rate of 1 USD to 4 tögrög. In the 1920s, the Mongolian government drove foreign merchants out of the country and introduced a foreign trade monopoly. Mongolia traded only with the USSR until the establishment of relations with China after World War II, which ceased after the 1960s Sino-Soviet split. Comecon membership enabled import of machinery and vehicles from Eastern Europe in exchange for raw materials, though some 85 percent of trade remained with the USSR. In the 1980s, 1 to 2 percent of trade was opened with Western countries; the value of imports far exceeded that of exports, and the imbalance was funded by long-term loans from the USSR, estimated at 10 billion rubles by 1990.

== Society ==
=== Education ===
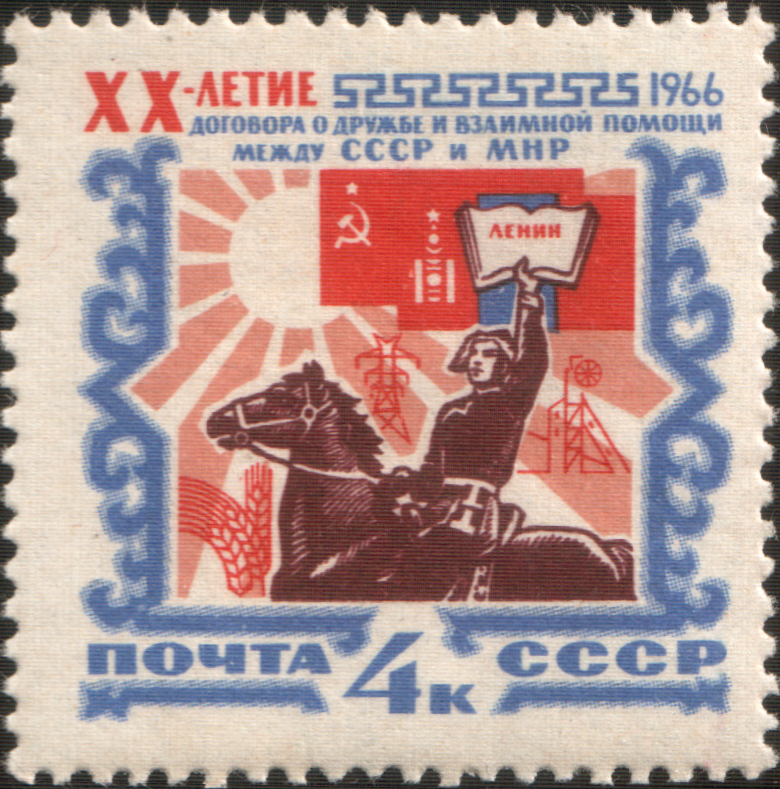
1966 Soviet stamp depicting a Mongol horseman with Lenin's book and the flags of the USSR and the MPR

Before the 1921 revolution, religious schools in monasteries taught lamas to read Buddhist scriptures in Tibetan and Mongol, and the few secular schools trained clerks for local administration. The first government-run primary school was opened in the capital in November 1921, followed by the first secondary school in 1923. The Ministry of Education was established in 1924, and devised a 10-year plan (1926–1936) for the development of education and teacher training. Buryat intellectual Erdene Batkhaan, minister of education in 1926–1929, played a key role. A nationwide cultural offensive was declared in 1930–1931 following the government's decision to adopt the Latin script for Mongolian and eradicate adult illiteracy; adoption of the Cyrillic script was decreed in March 1941, but only came into general use from January 1946. Starting in 1937, increasing numbers of Mongolian students were sent to the Soviet Union for training in vocational schools; Mongolia's first vocational school opened in 1938. Higher education in Mongolia began with the opening of the Mongolian State University in 1942. The number of general education schools rose from 331 with 24,000 pupils in 1940, to 359 with 50,000 pupils in 1947. Obligatory eight-year general education (ages eight to 16) was introduced gradually in the 1970s. In 1980, the 113 elementary schools taught grades one to four, 150 "incomplete" secondary education schools for grades one to nine, and 108 (267 by 1990) "complete" secondary education schools for grades one to 11.

=== Healthcare ===
Before the 1920s, Mongolia had no health services apart from what was provided by lamas or shamans, who offered a combination of herbal remedies and incantations, and the population was in decline from untreated sickness. Modern healthcare in Mongolia was developed starting in 1922 under the Soviet Semashko model, with the construction of a large hospital and clinical network and training of staff in Western medicine. The isolation of the country meant that developments in medicine were slow to reach it, though population decline was gradually reversed by the 1930s. The ratio of doctors to the general population increased dramatically; in 1990, there were more than 6,000 physicians, three-quarters of whom were women. The medical care system was accessible at little or no cost even in the most remote areas. State-sponsored maternity rest homes for pastoral women in the final stages of pregnancy helped to lower infant mortality from 109 per 1,000 live births in 1960 to 57.4 in 1990, and maternal mortality by about 25 percent from 1960 to 1990.

=== Media and arts ===
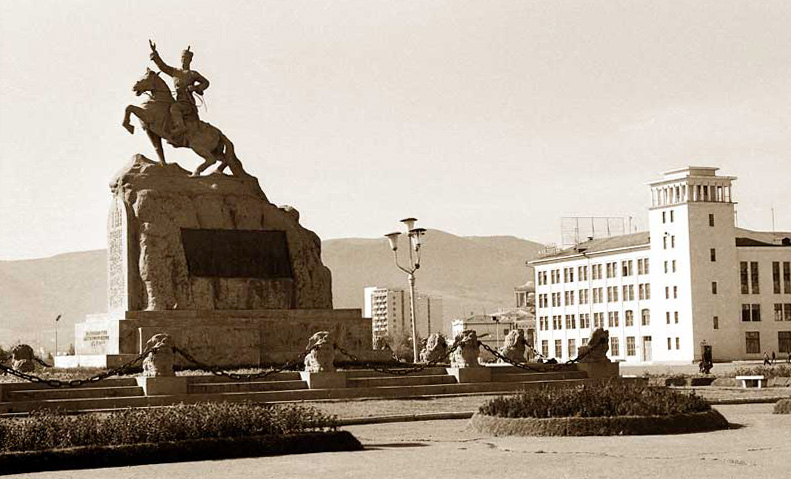
Equestrian monument to Damdin Sükhbaatar in Ulaanbaatar's Sükhbaatar Square in 1972

Under the one-party rule of the Mongolian People's Revolutionary Party, media in Mongolia was strictly controlled. The main source of information was the state-owned Montsame news agency. The official MPRP newspaper Ünen ('Truth'), founded in 1920 and still published today, served as a mouthpiece of the People's Great Khural, Council of Ministers, and MPRP Central Committee. The party also published the monthly journal Namyn Amidral ('Party Life'), which discussed theoretical matters. Other official publications included the Mongolian Revolutionary Youth League newspaper Zaluuchuudyn Ünen ('Youth Truth') and the cultural paper Utga Zokhiol Urlag ('Literature and Art'), which dispensed ideological guidance. Mongolradio was established in 1933, and Mongolteleviz in 1967.

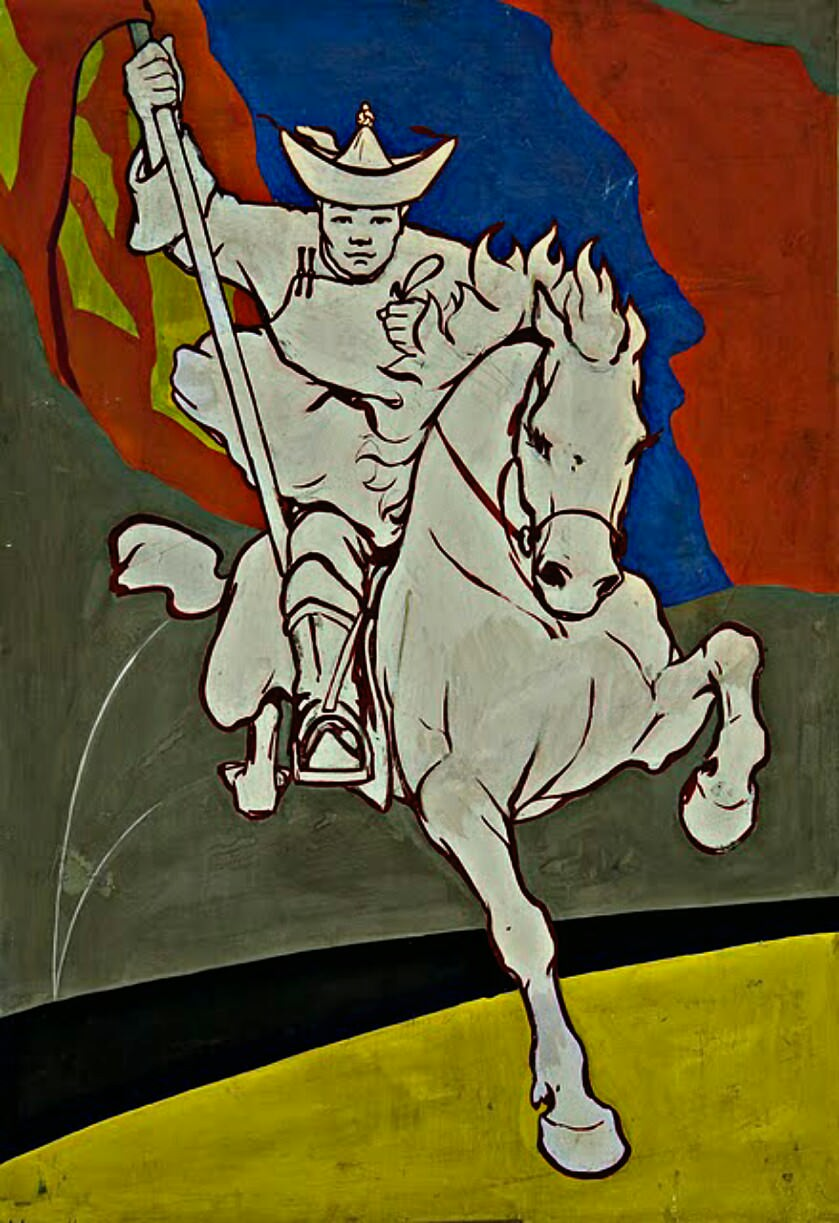
"Leaper of Capitalism" by Dagdangiin Amgalan, 1961

Under political pressure, traditional Mongolian arts were suppressed in favor of Soviet-inspired "socialist realism". Much of traditional culture was viewed as "feudal" or "religious", and was officially abandoned in favor of artworks depicting revolutionary heroism, intended to mold the "new man" of the socialist society. The MPRP established systematic censorship of press, publications, and artistic performance. However, there was disagreement and lack of clear direction, reflected in particular by the fluctuating political attitudes toward Mongolia's greatest hero, Genghis Khan. Common subjects of "socialist realism" included heroic shepherds and workers, and figures from history such as Sükhbaatar and Choibalsan (a prominent example being the monumental equestrian statue of Sükhbaatar which today stands in the center of Ulaanbaatar's Sükhbaatar Square). Some painters combined realism and Mongol zurag, a style developed in the early 20th century. Leaper of Capitalism, a design by Dagdangiin Amgalan depicting a Mongol rider jumping from feudalism to socialism, was reproduced in murals and as a stamp design.

The most prominent figure to emerge in modern Mongolian poetry and literature was Dashdorjiin Natsagdorj, whose opera Uchirtai gurvan tolgoi ("Three Fateful Hills") remains popular today. The national theater was established in 1931, represented by such playwrights as Sodnombaljiryn Buyannemekh and Donrovyn Namdag. Mongolia's first film studio, set up with Soviet aid in 1935, produced the drama Norjmaa's Destiny in 1938 but generally concentrated on full-length feature films about heroes from Mongolian history. There were co-productions with Soviet filmmakers, such as Son of Mongolia (1936), as well as film versions of classics such as Transparent Tamir by Chadraabalyn Lodoidamba, released as a trilogy in 1970–1973. The first Mongolian ballet, Path of Happiness by Bilegiin Damdinsüren, was staged in 1950. Traditional arts were best preserved as epic poetry, music, and song, which had been passed down by bards and storytellers and first recorded (in printed word and sound) in the 20th century. The state folk song and dance ensemble was established in 1961. Under Soviet influence, European instruments were introduced, foreign works were performed, and Mongolian composers began to write music for orchestras and brass bands. The first full-scale symphonic work, My Homeland, was composed in 1955 by Luvsanjambyn Mördorj. The National Symphony Orchestra was founded in 1957. The 1970s and 1980s saw the development of Soviet-style dance bands and popular music groups.

=== Science ===
In November 1921, Buryat scholar Tsyben Zhamtsarano founded the Committee of Scriptures and Manuscripts, which established national archives in 1927. In 1931, the institute was renamed the Committee of Sciences, and began to undertake studies in botany, agriculture, geography, geology, and mapmaking. Further research institutes were linked either to the government (building, education, health, and communications) or universities (physics, mathematics, biology, and the social sciences). The Institute of Party History supervised the writing of the history of the MPRP and the translation of Marxist–Leninist classics. There was close cooperation with the Soviet Academy of Sciences, whose Mongolian Commission supervised Soviet research on Mongolia. In 1961, the Mongolian Academy of Sciences was founded. Scientific cooperation with the Eastern Bloc was coordinated by Comecon.

== Military ==
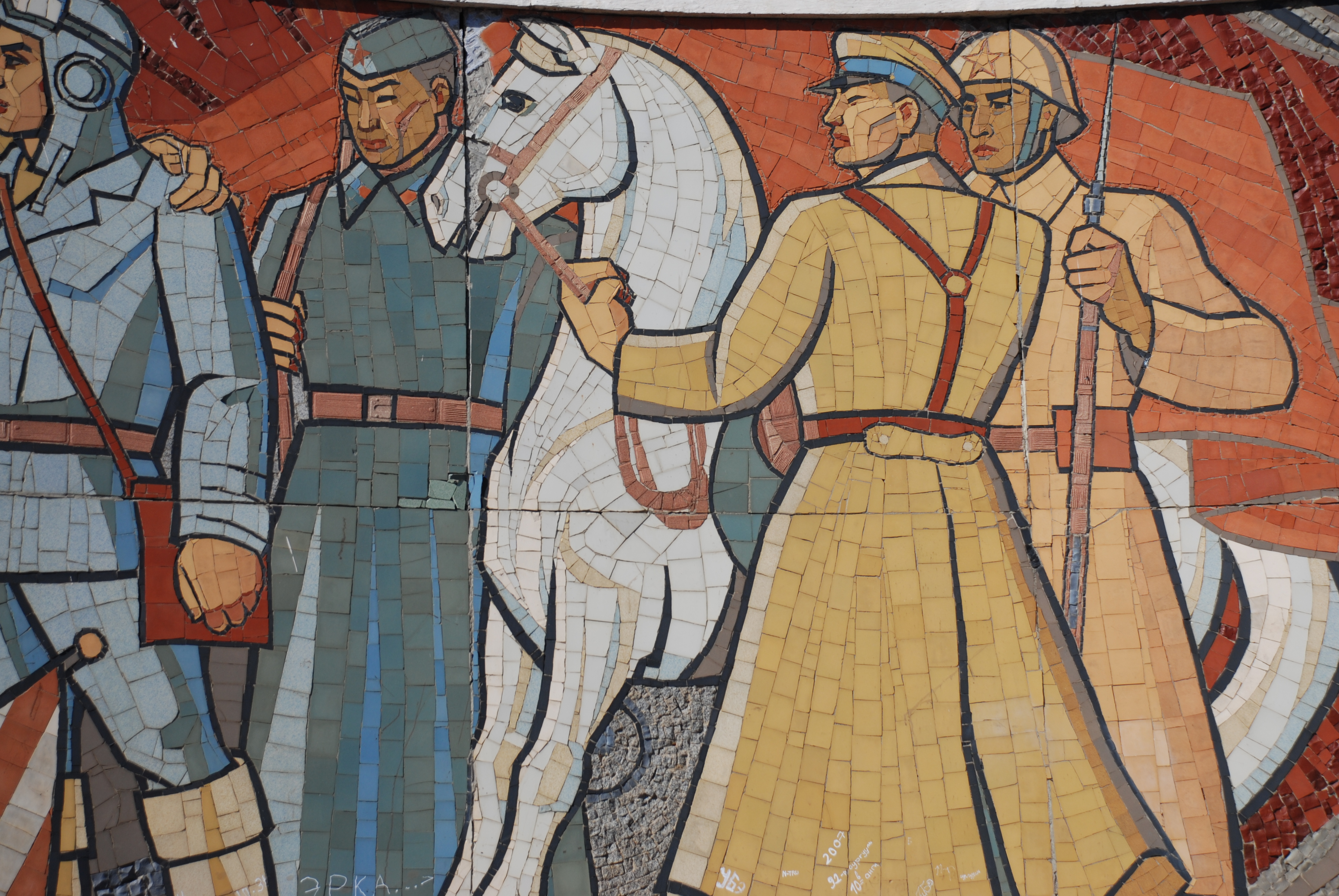
Zaisan Memorial in Ulaanbaatar

The Mongolian People's Revolutionary Army was founded during the 1921 People's Revolution, as a partisan force against Chinese occupation and White Russian forces. It primarily consisted of cavalry under its commander, Damdin Sükhbaatar. With Soviet technical aid and training, it received weapons, motor vehicles, communications equipment, and aircraft. Mongolian and Soviet troops clashed with Japanese forces in the Battle of Khalkhin Gol on Mongolia's eastern border in 1939, and jointly participated in the invasion of Manchuria in northern China in 1945, during which Mongolia was an important base. In the Battle of Baitag Bogd in 1947, Nationalist Chinese cavalry fought Mongolian and Soviet troops on the border with Xinjiang. The army was renamed the Mongolian People's Army in 1955. During the 1970s and 1980s, Mongolia received modern equipment, including tanks, armored personnel carriers, heavy and anti-aircraft artillery, radar, attack helicopters, and jet fighters. The Mongolian Air Force, founded in 1925, initially operated the civil airline MIAT, established in 1956.

Mongolian army ranks and uniforms were similar to those of their Soviet counterparts. As in the Soviet military, there was an army political directorate and deputy political commissars, whose function was to ensure loyalty to the MPRP. The army maintained close ties with Soviet GRU military intelligence and NKVD secret police; Mongolia's Interior Ministry secret police and Buryat Mongol Comintern agents assisted in its administration under direct Soviet guidance.

== See also ==
- List of communist states
- History of modern Mongolia
- Politics of Mongolia
- Mengjiang
- Tuvan People's Republic
