= Sampilyn Jalan-Aajav =

Mongolian politician (1923–2007)

Jalan-Aajav in 1983

Sampilyn Jalan-Aajav (Mongolian: Сампилын Жалан-Аажав, 18 June 1923 – February 2007) was a Mongolian politician and statesman. A lawyer by education, he was first elected to the People's Great Khural as a deputy of the ruling Mongolian People's Revolutionary Party in 1966, then to its Central Committee in 1971 and its Politburo in 1973. In 1977, he became the deputy chairman of the presidium of the Great Khural, in effect second to leader Yumjaagiin Tsedenbal. In 1983, Jalan-Aajav was internally exiled for allegedly conspiring to overthrow Tsedenbal.

== Biography ==
Sampilyn Jalan-Aajav was born on 18 June 1923 in Uliastai District, Zavkhan Province. He worked in the Tokhoi Tsagaan Bulag limestone quarry from 1937 to 1939, when he was sent to the Central Party and State School. He graduated from the Higher School for Party Cadres of the Mongolian People's Revolutionary Party (MPRP) Central Committee in 1943. He was a lecturer, then rector, of the Higher Party School from 1943 to 1951, studied for a law degree in the USSR from 1951 to 1956, and returned to the school as dean from 1956 to 1958. He was appointed head of the Propaganda and Culture Department of the Central Committee in 1959, and was briefly procurator of the MPR. From 1960, Jalan-Aajav was chairman of the Council of Ministers's Legal Committee, and from 1964 to 1971 chairman of the State Committee for Information and Broadcasting. He earned his higher degree in 1967.

Jalan-Aajav was first elected as an MPRP deputy to the People's Great Khural in 1966, and represented various constituencies: Bayankhongor 99 (1966–1969), Zavkhan 173 (1969–1973), Bayankhongor 120 (1973–1977), Khentii 326 (1977–1981), and Govi-Altai 167 (from 1981). He became a candidate member of the MPRP Central Committee in 1961, and was elected to a full membership in 1971. He was also elected as a candidate member of the MPRP Politburo and a secretary of the central committee, and was elevated to full membership in the politburo in April 1973. In 1977, Jalan-Aajav became deputy chairman of the presidium of the Great Khural (deputy head of state), and therefore second to the party leader and head of state, Yumjaagiin Tsedenbal.

In July 1983, Jalan-Aajav was suddenly dismissed from all posts; in February 1984, the MPRP journal Namyn Amidral ('Party Life') published the relevant decrees, in which he was described as an "antiparty element" who allegedly had been involved for 20 years in "vile intrigues" to overthrow Tsedenbal with the help of Tsogt-Ochiryn Lookhuuz, Baldandorjiin Nyambuu, and Bandiin Surmaajav, and with support from Daramyn Tömör-Ochir. Jalan-Aajav's ousting for "undermining party unity" was part of Tsedenbal's campaign to "root out weeds" in the party leadership, which led to the sacking of Bazaryn Shirendev and other prominent personalities before Tsedenbal himself was removed in 1984. Jalan-Aajav was exiled to Aldarkhaan District of Zavkhan Province.

After the end of the Mongolian People's Republic in 1992, Jalan-Aajav made a few brief public appearances in the late 1990s before taking up a teaching position at the law school of the Mongolian State University, and was awarded the title Merited Lawyer in December 2001. He died in February 2007.
