= Yumjaagiin Tsedenbal =

Leader of Mongolia from 1952 to 1984

- Юмжаагийн Цэдэнбал ᠶᠦᠮᠵᠢᠶ᠎ᠠ ᠎ᠶᠢᠨ ᠴᠡᠳᠡᠨᠪᠠᠯ
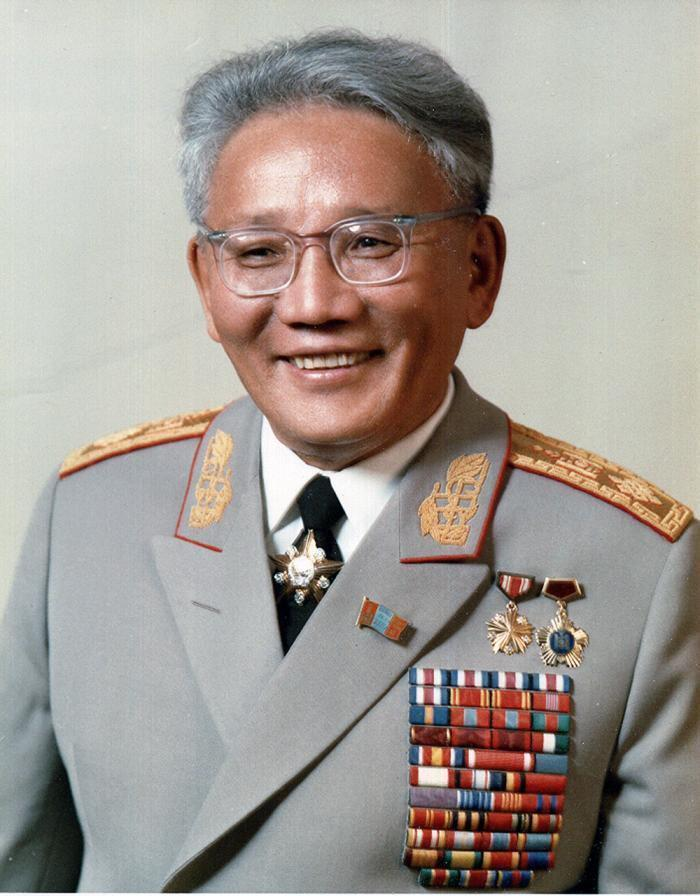
- Tsedenbal in the 1970s

General Secretary of the Mongolian People's Revolutionary Party (Note: From 22 November 1958 to 30 May 1981, the title of the office was First Secretary.)
- In office 22 November 1958 – 23 August 1984
- Preceded by: Dashiin Damba
- Succeeded by: Jambyn Batmönkh
- In office 8 April 1940 – 1 April 1954
- Preceded by: Dashiin Damba
- Succeeded by: Dashiin Damba

Chairman of the Presidium of the People's Great Khural
- In office 11 June 1974 – 23 August 1984
- Preceded by: Sonomyn Luvsan (acting)
- Succeeded by: Nyamyn Jagvaral (acting)

12th Chairman of the Council of Ministers
- In office 26 January 1952 – 11 June 1974
- Preceded by: Khorloogiin Choibalsan
- Succeeded by: Jambyn Batmönkh

Personal details
- Born: 17 September 1916 Bayan Chandamani Uula banner, Mongolia
- Died: 20 April 1991 (aged 74) Moscow, Soviet Union
- Resting place: Altan-Ölgii National Cemetery
- Party: Mongolian People's Revolutionary Party (1934–1990)
- Spouse: Anastasia Filatova
- Children: Vladislav; Zorig
- Education: Siberian Financial and Economic Institute
- Nickname: Бал дарга ("Chief Bal")

Military service
- Allegiance: Mongolian People's Republic
- Branch/service: Mongolian People's Army
- Years of service: 1934–1984
- Rank: Marshal
- De facto leader of the MPR (In role with Dashiin Damba from 1954 till 1958): ← Choibalsan; Batmönkh →

Yumjaagiin Tsedenbal (Mongolian: Юмжаагийн Цэдэнбал; (Note: /jʊmˌdʒɑːɡ ˈtsɛdəmbəl/ yuum-JAHG TSED-əm-bəl; Mongolian pronunciation: [jomˌt͡ɕaɟiŋ ˈt͡sʰɪtm̩pɐɮ]; Russian pronunciation: [jʊmʐɐˈɡʲɪjn t͡sɪdʲɪmˈbaɫ]) 17 September 1916 – 20 April 1991) was a Mongolian military officer and politician who led the Mongolian People's Republic as a dictator from 1952 to 1984. He served as General Secretary of the ruling Mongolian People's Revolutionary Party from 1940 to 1954 and again from 1958 to 1984, as Chairman of the Council of Ministers (head of government) from 1952 to 1974, and as Chairman of the Presidium of the People's Great Khural (head of state) from 1974 to 1984.

Tsedenbal rose to prominence in the 1940s as a member of leader Khorloogiin Choibalsan's inner circle, and succeeded him as premier after his death in 1952. Tsedenbal resisted de-Stalinization, and ousted and internally exiled several of his rivals in the 1960s. His policies were aimed at making Mongolia a loyal political and economic partner of the Soviet Union. Tsedenbal was the longest-serving leader of modern Mongolia and the second longest-serving leader of any Eastern Bloc country (after Todor Zhivkov), serving until his expulsion with Soviet support in 1984. He retired to Moscow and died in 1991, and his legacy has sometimes been considered controversial since the 1990 democratic revolution, but has been rehabilitated since 1997.

== Early life and education ==
Yumjaagiin Tsedenbal (originally Tserenpil) was born on 17 September 1916 to an unwed Dörbet mother in the Bayan Chandamani Uula banner (modern Davst District, Uvs Province). In October 1929, he and 21 other Mongolian students were selected to study at a special rabfak (preparatory school) in Irkutsk in the Soviet Union. In 1931, he joined the Mongolian Revolutionary Youth League. After graduating from the rabfak, Tsedenbal attended the Siberian Financial and Economic Institute in Irkutsk, from which he graduated in July 1938. The Mongolian students were invited for sightseeing in Moscow, where Tsedenbal was noticed by the Central Committee of the Communist Party of the Soviet Union. In September 1938, he returned to Mongolia and began working as an instructor at the Ulaanbaatar Financial College, a technical school attached to the Finance Ministry.

== Party career and rise ==
After he was recommended to Mongolia's leader, Khorloogiin Choibalsan, by Soviet intelligence officer and diplomatic representative Ivan Alekseevich Ivanov, in 1939 Tsendenbal joined the Mongolian People's Revolutionary Party (MPRP), and became deputy finance minister that March. From July 1939 to March 1940, Tsedenbal was concurrently Mongolia's minister of finance and chairman of the board of the state bank (Bank of Trade and Industry). In December 1939, Tsedenbal joined Choibalsan and Ivanov for a meeting with Soviet leader Joseph Stalin in Moscow. There, Choibalsan promised to purge sitting MPRP secretary Banzarjavyn Baasanjav to replace him with Tsedenbal, which was done with Baasanjav's execution in February 1940. Eventually though, Baasanjav was rehabilitated in 1957 and acknowledged as unjustly slandered and punished and as one of several high ranking government officials who were the victims of an "out of control Interior Ministry".

In March 1940, at age 24, Tsedenbal was elected a member of the Central Committee, member of the Presidium, and general secretary at the MPRP's Tenth Congress, becoming the country's number-two leader. Though he was part of Choibalsan's inner circle, unlike him Tsedenbal was not enthusiastic about pan-Mongolian unification, and around 1950 instead supported the proposal advanced by several young party officials that Mongolia join the Soviet Union in order to achieve socialism. Tsedenbal was responsible for the introduction of the Cyrillic script for writing the Mongolian language, replacing Mongolian script.

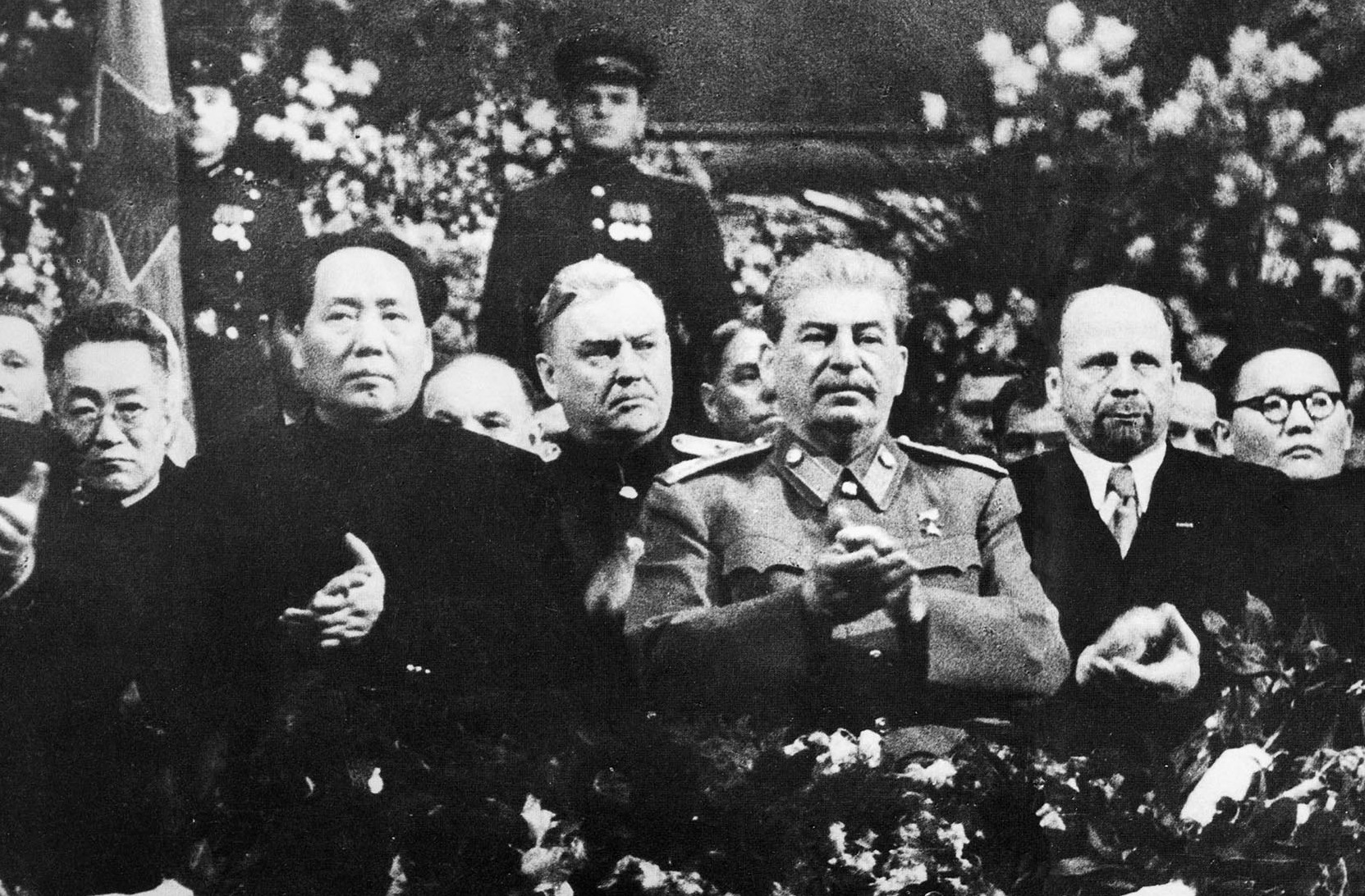
Tsedenbal (far right) at Joseph Stalin's 71st birthday ceremony with Mao Zedong, Nikolai Bulganin, and Walter Ulbricht, 1949

During World War II in the Soviet Union from 1941 to 1945, Tsedenbal served as head of the Political Directorate and deputy commander-in-chief of the Mongolian People's Army, with the rank of lieutenant general, and was awarded the Soviet Order of Lenin. Mongolia did not declare war on Nazi Germany after its invasion of the USSR, but supported the Soviet war effort by financing a tank regiment and a fighter squadron, and by donating horses, winter clothing, and money. Some Mongolian workers and students under training in the Soviet Union joined the Soviet Red Army. Tsedenbal was appointed chairman of the State Planning Commission in 1945 and deputy chairman of the Council of Ministers in 1948.

== Leader of Mongolia ==
=== Consolidation of power ===
Following Choibalsan's death in January 1952, Tsedenbal allied with second secretary Dashiin Damba to defeat a bid for power by hardliner Chimeddorjiyn Sürenjav, who was exiled to Moscow. Tsedenbal was appointed chairman of the Council of Ministers (premier) on 27 May 1952. As premier, he immediately visited Moscow and Beijing (where the People's Republic of China had been established in 1949), and signed agreements which created the Trans-Mongolian Railway and an alliance between the countries. The Mongolian Politburo formally approved joining the Soviet Union. While attending Stalin's funeral in March 1953, Tsedenbal presented the request to the Soviet leadership, which rejected and rebuked it.

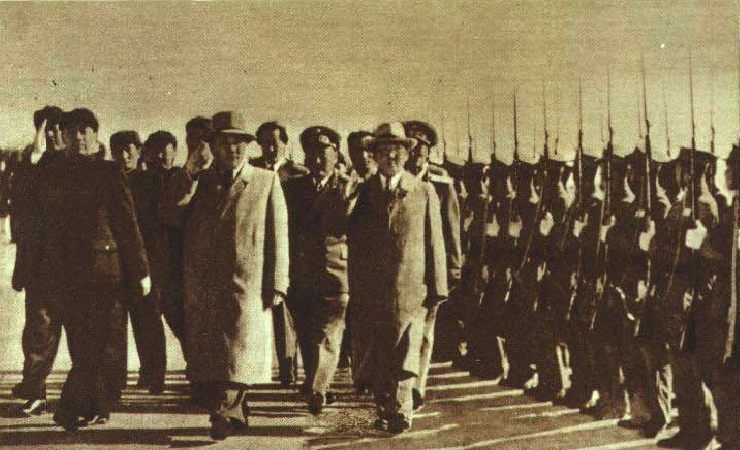
Tsedenbal during a visit to Beijing in 1952

In 1954, Tsedenbal lost the position of general secretary to Damba (who gained the title of first secretary). The two men split over the Mongolian response to Soviet leader Nikita Khrushchev's speech criticizing Stalin in April 1956. The Mongolian Politburo initially created a special commission, headed by Bazaryn Shirendev, to re-examine the purges of the Choibalsan period. While Damba supported the commission, Tsedenbal repeatedly blocked its work. In 1958, Tsedenbal ousted and internally exiled Damba, taking over his position (Tsedenbal regained the title of general secretary in 1981). In 1961–1962, as Khrushchev intensified the Soviet de-Stalinization drive, a "Rehabilitation Commission" was appointed, whose work Tsedenbal also criticized. For example, in 1963, the Mongolian Politburo banned the film Tümnii Neg ("A Million in One"), which dealt with the purges. Due to Tsedenbal's stubborn resistance to de-Stalinization, a statue of Stalin stood in front of the Mongolian National Library until 1990.

In 1962–1963, Tsedenbal began expelling several rivals and critics from the MPRP on charges of "nationalism". In 1962, Mongolia's Politburo was organizing celebrations for the 800th anniversary of the birth of Genghis Khan when the Soviet Communist Party newspaper Pravda criticized the "Mongol–Tatar yoke" imposed on the Russian people by the "reactionary" Genghis. The politburo canceled the celebrations, and on 10 September the member in charge of organizing the celebrations, Daramyn Tömör-Ochir, was scapegoated by Tsedenbal, ousted, and internally exiled for trying "to create an unhealthy mood in public opinion and to inflame nationalist passions"; he was followed by Luvsantserengiin Tsend. At a central committee meeting in December 1964, three members handling economic issues, Tsogt-Ochiryn Lookhuuz, Baldandorjiin Nyambuu, and Bandiin Surmaajav, argued that living standards were declining, and criticized the party's "petit-bourgeois" attitude. They were named an "anti-party group" by Tsedenbal, expelled from the party, and internally exiled. In 1966, Tsedenbal, the undisputed leader, received Leonid Brezhnev on the first visit of a Soviet leader to Mongolia and presided unchallenged over the Fifteenth Congress.

=== Domestic policy ===
Tsedenbal was close to the Soviet leadership and a strong proponent of Soviet political and economic policies, and described the relationship between the countries as an "elder brother–younger brother" (akh düü) one. In 1962, Tsedenbal proposed the slogan that mastering Russian, "the language of Lenin", was "a component of ideological education" (in the late 1970s, an attempt to conduct all higher education in Russian was narrowly defeated). From 1963, Tsedenbal condemned many areas of emerging intellectual endeavor, including abstract art, new appreciation of Buddhist literature, and survey-based sociology, among others. In a note written in 1963, he rejected Chinese suggestions that Mongolia, by being relegated to mining and light industry, was becoming a colony of the Soviet Union. From 1966, Tsedenbal's policies were shaped by a determination to make Mongolia an "industrial-agricultural country". While the USSR prodded the Mongolian government to concentrate its efforts on the development of agriculture and the mineral sector, Tsedenbal and his followers sought to foster rapid industrialization (mostly semi-processing of raw materials for the Soviet market) even in the face of Soviet opposition. Despite stating that "new young forces must be drawn into leadership work", he cemented an aging leadership, and the Politburo changed little between 1966 and 1981.

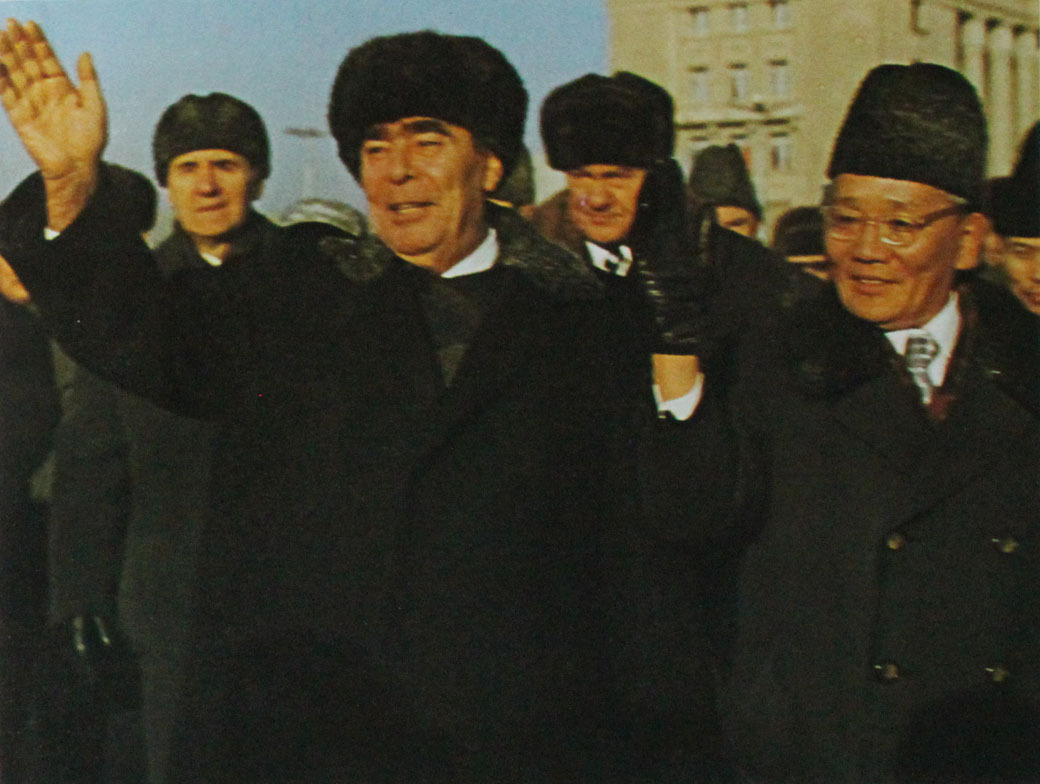
Tsedenbal with Soviet leader Leonid Brezhnev in 1974

Despite his modest protestations to the contrary, Tsedenbal developed a cult of personality during his tenure. He was awarded the highest distinction of Hero of the Mongolian People's Republic and presented with the Order of Sükhbaatar on his 50th birthday in 1966 for his "special services to the party, state, and Mongolian people", and was made an honorary member of the Academy of Sciences. On his 60th birthday in 1976, he received another Order of Sükhbaatar at a "grand ceremony", an exhibition about him was opened in Ulaanbaatar, and a bronze bust was unveiled in Ulaangom, the center of his home province of Uvs. Brezhnev awarded him another Order of Lenin. Tsedenbal promoted himself to army general, the highest rank in the Mongolian People's Army, and in 1979 created for himself the rank of marshal of the Mongolian People's Republic. On his 65th birthday in 1981, Marshal Tsedenbal was given another Order of Sükhbaatar (he was awarded six altogether).

=== Foreign policy ===
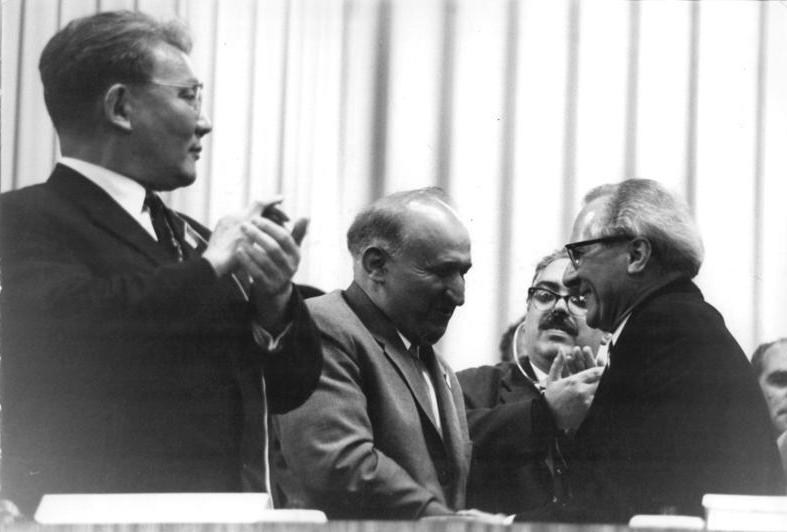
Tsedenbal with Bulgarian leader Todor Zhivkov and East German leader Erich Honecker in 1971

In the early years of his rule, Tsedenbal favored balanced relations between Mongolia and China. In 1959, Tsedenbal was in Beijing for the 10th anniversary of the People's Republic of China. At the time of the Sino-Soviet split, Tsedenbal decisively sided with the Soviet Union and incurred China's wrath. Despite this, the two countries managed to sign a border treaty in 1962. Mongolia sought to secure its borders, while China sought to normalize relations with both its former Mongolian ally and neutral North Korea, for which the territorial concessions might have been were very large. In the early 1960s, he signed an order expelling all Chinese citizens from Mongolia. The resolution was met with outrage: "Break off Tsedenbal's dog's head," was written onto the Mongolian embassy, and Mao Zedong and Zhou Enlai stated that "Comrade Tsedenbal is trampling on diplomacy." With the intensification of the Sino-Soviet border conflict in the 1960s, the signing of a treaty with the USSR in Ulaanbaatar in early 1966 by Brezhnev and Tsedenbal, allowed the Soviet Union to station troops in Mongolia to ensure mutual defense, being the first time that foreign troops were stationed in the republic.

In July 1956, he welcomed North Korean leader Kim Il Sung on a state visit. As it relates to the Korean conflict, Tsedenbal, during a 1971 visit of the North Korean deputy premier in honor of the 50th anniversary of the Mongolian People's Revolution, declared that his nation "strongly support the struggle of the Korean people to unify the motherland by peaceful, democratic means and for the liberation of South Korea." Tsedenbal visited Bucharest on 9 September 1957, becoming the first Mongolian leader to visit Romania. His relationship with President Nicolae Ceaușescu proved to be frosty, being critical of the latter for his more independent foreign policy. Mongolia under Tsedenbal increased its participation in international organizations, attempting first in 1955 to have the MPR join the United Nations (with the request being vetoed by the Republic of China on the island of Taiwan) and being admitted into the UN in 1961. During the Vietnam War, he supported the Soviet position, in part due to the stance of the Chinese in this regard. During a February 1973 visit to New Delhi, an Indo-Mongolian joint declaration was signed by Tsedenbal and Indira Gandhi. Furthermore, he supported India in the Bangladesh Liberation War of 1971, at the expense of relations with Pakistan. Under Tsedenbal, Mongolia established ties with West Germany on 31 January 1974.

=== Decline and ousting ===
Around late 1973, Tsedenbal began to experience moments of memory loss and spells of dizziness, which grew increasingly serious from 1975 on. In 1974, Tsendenbal resigned as premier, handing the office to his underling Jambyn Batmönkh, and became chairman of the presidium of the People's Great Khural (head of state). In 1981, at the Eighteenth Party Congress, Tsedenbal was praised as "the best leader of party and state", and again began purging intellectuals and former allies to "root out weeds" in the leadership. In 1982, he dismissed Shirendev, then the president of the Academy of Sciences; in December 1983, he linked Sampilyn Jalan-Aajav, the deputy head of state, to the 1963 "anti-party" group and internally exiled him. By 1984, one-third of the Central Committee and almost half the ministry heads appointed in 1981 had been dismissed by Tsedenbal.

After Brezhnev's death in 1982, the new Soviet leadership decided in November 1983 that Tsedenbal's erratic behaviour was becoming a liability. On 9 August 1984, while Tsedenbal was vacationing in Moscow, the Kremlin's doctor diagnosed him as suffering from "overwork", and top Soviet leaders summoned Batmönkh and Tsedenbal's old ally Demchigjabyn Molomjamts, telling them Tsedenbal could no longer serve. On 23 August, the Mongolian Politburo dismissed Tsedenbal from all positions "on account of his state of health, and with his agreement".

== Later life and death ==
After his dismissal, Tsedenbal lived in retirement with his family at their flat in Moscow. In 1986, Batmönkh's position was reinforced by another MPRP Congress and Great Khural election. In 1988, Batmönkh and official media began to blame him by name for the political and economic "stagnation" into which the country had declined. In December 1988, Batmönkh called for greater openness in political and social affairs and the press blamed Tsedenbal and his "administrative command" methods for the country's stagnation, following the line of Mikhail Gorbachev's policies of glasnost and perestroika in the Soviet Union. An MPRP Central Committee resolution described Tsedenbal as "willful and unprincipled" and said he "belittled collective leadership". In June 1989, the MPRP revised the Party Rules, Party Program, and procedures for rehabilitation of victims of the personality cult.

Following the resignation of the MPRP Politburo and Secretariat in March 1990 at the height of the democratic revolution, the MPRP Central Committee criticized Tsedenbal's legacy, stripped him of his titles, and expelled him from the party "for not fulfilling his lofty responsibilities". It also rehabilitated his old enemies, including Tömör-Ochir, Lookhuuz, Nyambuu, and Surmaajav. Mongolia's new government planned to try Tsedenbal and other members of the MPRP Politburo on various charges, but by February 1991, he was considered too ill to face trial. Tsedenbal died on 20 April 1991 at a Moscow hospital from "bile duct cancer, purulent poisoning and chronic liver failure." After he died, his body was brought back to Mongolia. His funeral was held at the Officers' Palace on 29 April, and he was buried (after some debate) with military honors at Altan-Ölgii National Cemetery in Ulaanbaatar.

== Legacy ==
In Mongolia, Tsedenbal is remembered for successfully maintaining a path of relatively moderate socialism during the Cold War. By the decree of President Punsalmaagiin Ochirbat in 1997, the 1990 decree that stripped him of his rank and awards was invalidated. A statue of Tsedenbal was built in 2000 on the plaza in front of the National Drama Academic Theater which has since been renamed to Tsedenbal Square (Цэдэнбалын талбай). The statue and its surroundings were refurbished in 2013. On 21 September 2016, the Erdenet Mining Corporation was named after him.

In 2019, Mongolian filmmakers produced a biographical film of Tsedenbal. His son Zorig founded the Tsedenbal Academy in Mongolia.

== Personal life ==
His Russian wife, Anastasia Filatova, was often said to be the most powerful political figure in Mongolia due to her close relationship with the Soviet leader Leonid Brezhnev. They had three children.

== Political positions ==
Yumjaagiin Tsedenbal embraced Marxism-Leninism and state-centered nationalism, while opposing chauvinism. The policies of Tsedenbal are also known as Tsedenbalism.

== Awards ==
=== Mongolian People's Republic ===
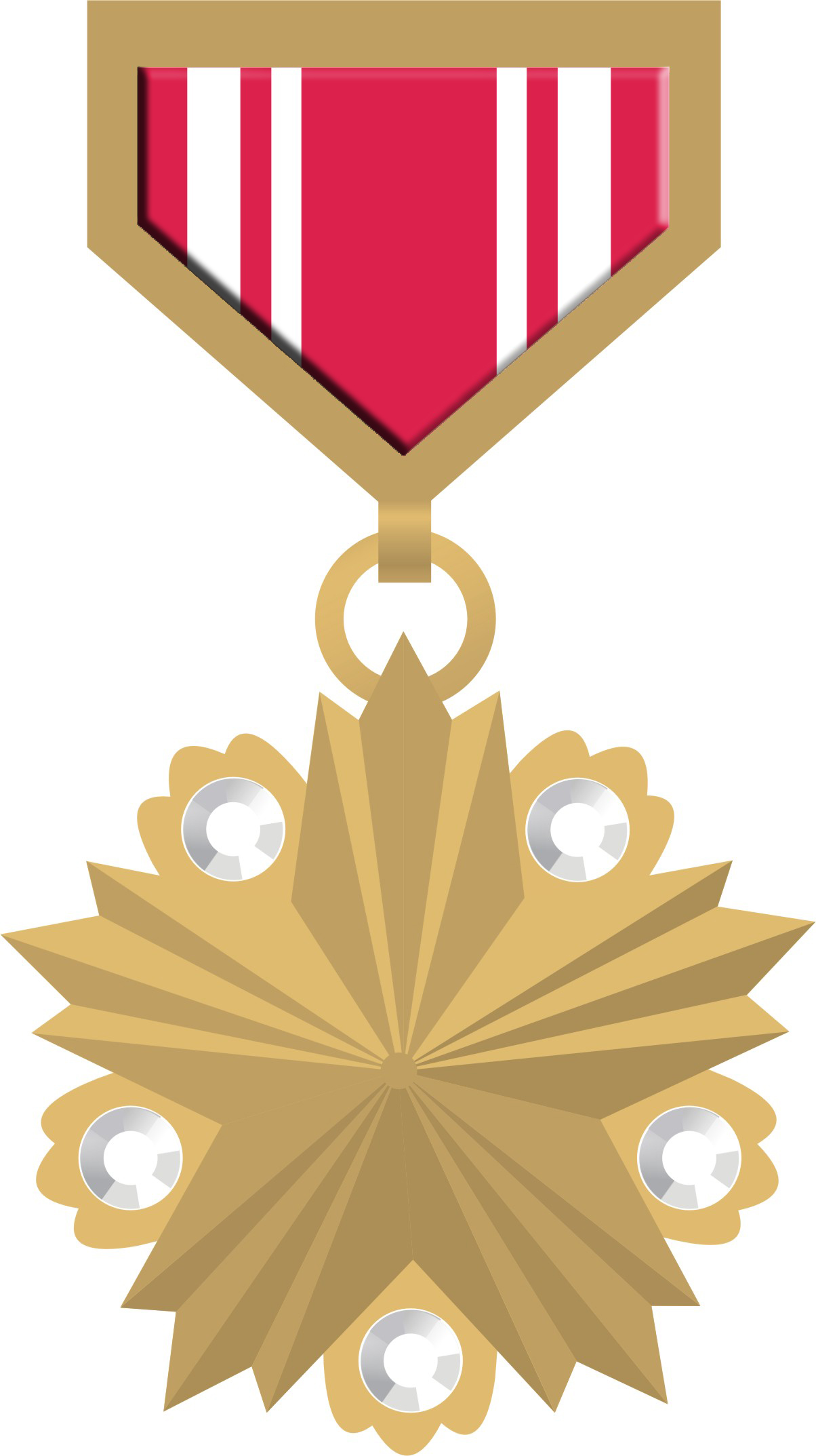
- Hero of the Mongolian People's Republic (1966)
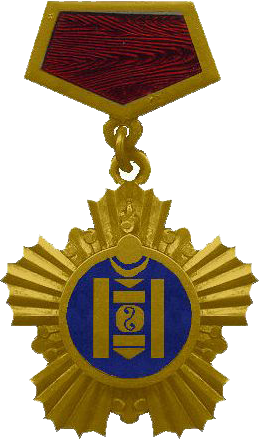
- Hero of Labor of the Mongolian People's Republic (1961)
- 6 Orders of Sukhbaatar
- 2 Orders of the Red Banner
- Order of the Red Banner of Labor
- Order of Friendship
- Medal "For Victory over Japan"
- Medal "30 year anniversary of the Victory over Japan"
- Medal "25th Anniversary of Mongolian People's Revolution"
- Medal "30 year anniversary of the Battle of Khalkhin Gol"
- Medal "40 year anniversary of the Battle of Khalkhin Gol"
- Medal "50 years of the Mongolian People's Republic"
- Medal "50 years of the Mongolian People's Army"

=== Soviet Union ===
- 3 Orders of Lenin (1944, 1976, 1986)
- Order of the October Revolution
- Order of Kutuzov, 1st class
- Medal "For the Victory over Germany in the Great Patriotic War 1941–1945"
- Medal "For the Victory over Japan"
- Jubilee Medal "In Commemoration of the 100th Anniversary of the Birth of Vladimir Ilyich Lenin"
- Jubilee Medal "Twenty Years of Victory in the Great Patriotic War 1941-1945"
- Jubilee Medal "Thirty Years of Victory in the Great Patriotic War 1941–1945"
- Jubilee Medal "50 Years of the Armed Forces of the USSR"
- Jubilee Medal "60 Years of the Armed Forces of the USSR"

=== Other countries ===
- 2 Orders of Georgi Dimitrov (Bulgaria)
- Order of Jose Marti (Cuba)
- Order of the White Lion, 1st class (Czechoslovakia)
- Order of Karl Marx (East Germany)
- Grand Star of Peoples' Friendship (East Germany)
- Order of the National Flag (Hungary)
- Order of the National Flag, 1st class (North Korea)
- Order of the Grand Cross of the Rebirth of Poland (Poland)
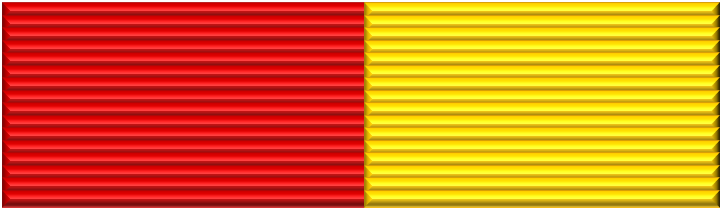
- Gold Star Order (Vietnam)
- Great Star of the Order of the Yugoslav Star (Yugoslavia)

== Notes ==
Party political offices
Preceded by Dashiin Damba	General Secretary of the Mongolian People's Party; 8 April 1940 – 4 April 1954	Succeeded by Dashiin Damba
Preceded by Dashiin Damba	General Secretary of the Mongolian People's Party; 22 November 1958 – 24 August 1984	Succeeded by Jambyn Batmönkh
Political offices
Preceded by Khorloogiin Choibalsan	Prime Minister of Mongolia; 26 January 1952 – 11 June 1974	Succeeded by Jambyn Batmönkh
Preceded by Sonomyn Luvsan	Chairman of the Presidium of the State Great Khural of Mongolia; 11 June 1974 – 8 August 1984	Succeeded by Nyamyn Jagvaral
