= Khas-Ochiryn Luvsandorj =

Mongolian politician (1910–1937)

- Хас-Очирын Лувсандорж

Secretary of the Mongolian People's Revolutionary Party
- In office 5 October 1934 – 15 August 1936
- Preceded by: Dorjjavyn Luvsansharav
- Succeeded by: Banzarjavyn Baasanjav

Personal details
- Born: 1910 Tüsheet Khan, Outer Mongolia, Qing China (modern Shaamar, Selenge)
- Died: 16 November 1937 (aged 26–27)
- Party: Mongolian People's Revolutionary Party

Khas-Ochiryn Luvsandorj (Mongolian: Хас-Очирын Лувсандорж; 1910 – 16 November 1937) was a Mongolian politician. He was the Secretary of the ruling Mongolian People's Revolutionary Party from 1934 to 1936; in 1937, he was arrested on charges of counter-revolution, and was executed the following November.

== Biography ==
Khas-Ochiryn Luvsandorj was born in 1910 in Tüsheet Khan (later Shaamar District, Selenge Province). He began work in 1926 as a scribe in the local tamgyn gazar (administration), and in 1932 became chairman of the provincial committee of the Mongolian Revolutionary Youth League. In 1933, he was elected chairman of the Selenge provincial committee of the Mongolian People's Revolutionary Party and, in 1934, a member of the presidium and as secretary of the party's Central Committee (October 1934 to August 1936). During his tenure, he was also editor of the publication Namyn Baiguulalt ('Party Organization'). In the autumn of 1936, he was sent to the Soviet Institute of Oriental Studies. While in Mongolia on holiday in the summer of 1937, he was arrested by the Internal Security Directorate's "special commission" on charges of counterrevolution during the Stalinist purges. He was sentenced to death and shot on 16 November 1937, and rehabilitated in 1962.

Party political offices
Preceded by Dorjjavyn Luvsansharav	General Secretary of the Central Committee of the Mongolian People's Party; October 5, 1934 - August 15, 1936	Succeeded by Banzarjavyn Baasanjav
