= Banzarjavyn Baasanjav =

Mongolian politician

- Банзаржавын Баасанжав
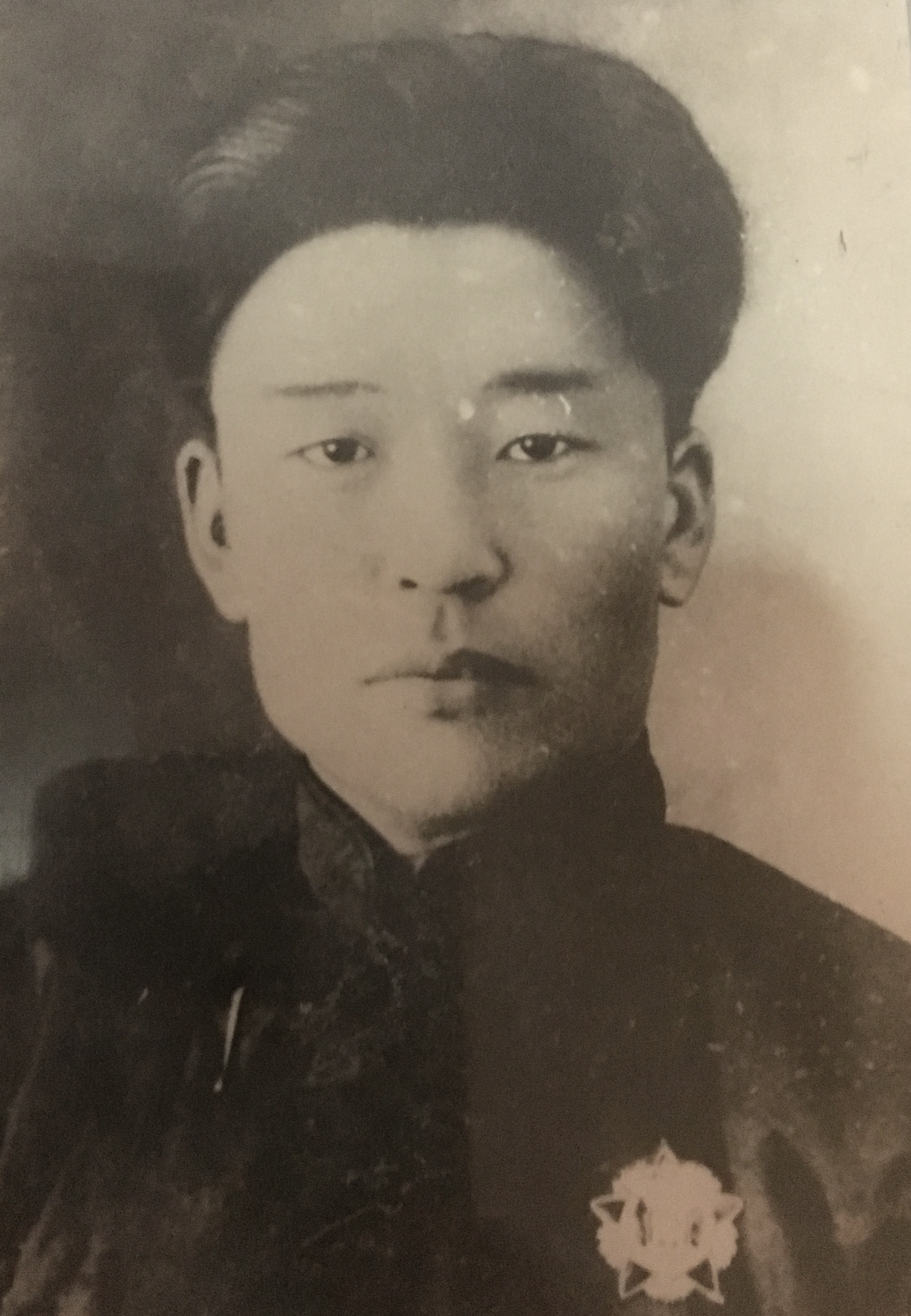

General Secretary of the Central Committee of the Mongolian People's Party
- In office October 7, 1936 – February 22, 1940
- Preceded by: Khas-Ochiryn Luvsandorj
- Succeeded by: Dashiin Damba

Personal details
- Born: 1906; Khovd Province, Outer Mongolia, Qing China
- Died: 1940 (aged 33–34)
- Party: MPRP (1930–1940)

Banzarjavyn Baasanjav (Mongolian: Банзаржавын Баасанжав; 1906–1940) was General Secretary of the Mongolian People's Revolutionary Party from 1936 to 1940. Prime Minister Khorloogiin Choibalsan arranged for his arrest and subsequent execution on charges of counterrevolution in 1940 to free up the party leadership role for Yumjaagiin Tsedenbal.

== Career ==
Baasanjav was born in 1906 in present-day Myangad district, Khovd Province, Mongolia. He joined Mongolian Revolutionary Youth League (MRYL) in 1923 and from 1927 to 1928 he was a school teacher near Ulaangom. After 1928 he devoted himself full-time to the MRYL, becoming secretary of its district committee.

He joined the Mongolian People's Revolutionary Party (MPRP) in 1930 and a year later was sent to Ulaanbaatar to be first a MPRP Central Committee instructor and then, from 1932 to 1936, Chairman of the Khovd Provincial MPRP Committee.

In October 1936 he was elected member of the Presidium and General Secretary of the Central Committee of the MRPR. He was also concurrently Chairman of Mongolian Trade Unions.

== Purge ==
In December 1939 Choibalsan and then Deputy Minister of Finance Tsedenbal traveled to Moscow to meet with Josef Stalin. Stalin made known his wishes to see the 23-year-old Tsedenbal, whom the Soviet leadership had earlier handpicked for advancement, promoted to Secretary General of the MPRP. Upon his return, Choibalsan orchestrated Baasanjav's arrest and subsequent execution on charges of counterrevolution in February 1940. Tsedenbal was elected head of the MPRP two months later at the 10th MPRP Party Congress (March 20 - April 5, 1940).

== Rehabilitation ==
Baasanjav was rehabilitated in 1957. The official MPRP History published in 1969 stated that Baasanjav was one of several high ranking government officials who were the victims of an "out of control Interior Ministry" and that he was unjustly slandered and punished.

== Notes ==
Party political offices
| Preceded by Khas-Ochiryn Luvsandorj | General Secretary of the Central Committee of the Mongolian People's Party; October 7, 1936 - February 22, 1940 | Succeeded by Dashiin Damba |
