= Erdene Batkhaan =

Buryat intellectual (1888–1948?)

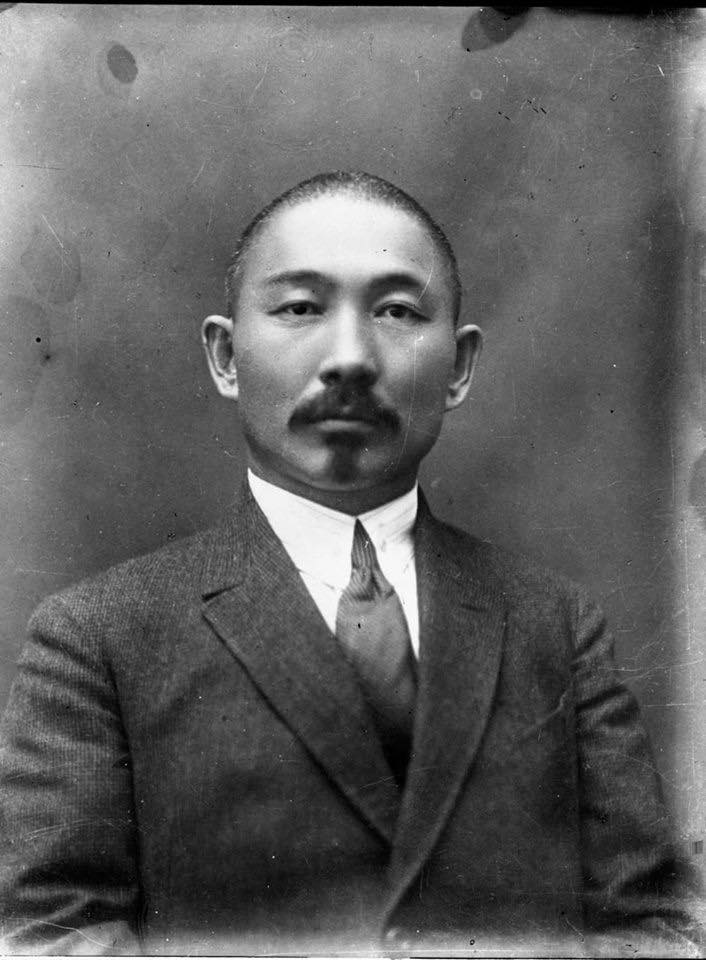
Erdene Batkhaan

Erdene Batkhaan (Mongolian: Эрдэнэбатхаан; born Nikita Fedorovich Batukhanov, Russian: Никита Фёдорович Батуханов; 1888–1948?) was a Buryat intellectual. He served as the Minister of Education of the Mongolian People's Republic from 1926 to 1930, during which he arranged for Mongolian children to study in Europe. He was exiled to the Soviet Union in 1930, and in 1937 was arrested during the Stalinist Great Purge.

== Biography ==
Nikita Fedorovich Batukhanov (Batkhaan) was born in 1888 in the Russian Empire, and was later named Erdene ("precious" in Mongolian). In 1914, Batkhaan moved to Mongolia's capital of Niĭslel Khüree (today Ulaanbaatar) to work as a teacher. In March 1921, he was appointed as the secretary of the provisional government of the 1921 revolution, and in November served as interpreter and adviser to the Mongolian delegation to the Soviet Union.

In 1924, Batkhaan was elected to the Little Khural and gained a position in the Ministry of Education. Seeking guidance on literary translation, he wrote to Russian writer Maxim Gorky, whose reply in May 1925 (published in the Mongolian press) stated that "propaganda of the principle of activity" would be useful for Mongols to counter the Buddhist teaching that "desire is the source of suffering". Gorky recommended works of foreign science and fiction which "depict[ed] the heroism of man guided by the ideas of justice and freedom". While serving as the country's minister of education from 1926 to 1930, Batkhaan arranged for groups of Mongolian children to study in Germany and France for several years. He also organized the publication of Mongolian maps and an atlas in Europe, and the manufacture of a Mongolian script typewriter while in Germany.

In 1929, Batkhaan was accused of "right opportunism" and relieved of his duties. The students were sent home from Europe "on holiday" that summer, never to return. In 1930, Batkhaan was sent to the Institute of Oriental Languages in Leningrad, where he taught Mongolian. During the Great Purge, he was arrested by the Soviet NKVD in 1937 and sent to a Gulag camp at Ukhta in the Komi ASSR. He was reported to have died in Mongolia in 1948.
