= United Nations Security Council Resolution 166 =

UN Security Council Resolution 166
- Date: October 25 1961
- Meeting no.: 971
- Code: S/4968 (Document)
- Subject: Admission of new Members to the UN: Mongolia
- Voting summary: 9 voted for; None voted against; 1 abstained; 1 present not voting
- Result: Adopted

Security Council composition
- Permanent members: China; France; Soviet Union; United Kingdom; United States
- Non-permanent members: Ceylon; Chile; Ecuador; Liberia; Turkey; United Arab Republic

United Nations Security Council Resolution 166, adopted on October 25, 1961, after examining the application of the Mongolian People's Republic for membership in the United Nations the Council recommended to the General Assembly that the Mongolian People's Republic be admitted.

Resolution 166 was approved by nine votes to none, with one abstention from the United States. The Republic of China spoke at the meeting but did not participate in voting (did not vote for, against, or abstain).

== See also ==
- History of Mongolia
- List of United Nations Security Council Resolutions 101 to 200 (1953–1965)
