= Dashiin Damba =

Mongolian politician (1908–1989)

- Дашийн Дамба

First Secretary of the Mongolian People's Revolutionary Party (Note: Damba's 1939–1940 term was as a Secretary of the Central Committee, an office with multiple holders.)
- In office 4 April 1954 – 22 November 1958
- Preceded by: Yumjaagiin Tsedenbal (as General Secretary)
- Succeeded by: Yumjaagiin Tsedenbal
- In office 4 July 1939 – 8 April 1940 Serving with Banzarjavyn Baasanjav
- Preceded by: Bat-Ochiryn Eldev-Ochir; Dorjjavyn Luvsansharav
- Succeeded by: Yumjaagiin Tsedenbal (as General Secretary)

Personal details
- Born: 29 March 1908 Tüsheet Khan, Outer Mongolia, Qing China (present-day Teshig, Bulgan)
- Died: 1989 (aged 80–81)
- Party: Mongolian People's Revolutionary Party (1930–?)
- De facto leader of the MPR (In role with Yumjaagiin Tsedenbal): ← Tsedenbal; Tsedenbal →

Dashiin Damba (Mongolian: Дашийн Дамба; 29 March 1908 – 1989) was a Mongolian politician who was the First Secretary of the ruling Mongolian People's Revolutionary Party from 1954 to 1958 during the brief period of collective leadership in the country after the death of Khorloogiin Choibalsan. Damba was ousted and sent into internal exile by leader Yumjaagiin Tsedenbal due to his support for de-Stalinization policies.

== Early life and career ==
Dashiin Damba was born on 29 March 1908 in Daiching Zasag banner of Tüsheet Khan (later Teshig District, Bulgan Province). He joined the Mongolian Revolutionary Youth League in 1924, and became a secretary at the district and provincial levels and on the Ulaanbaatar city committee. In 1929–1930, Damba helped carry out the government's expropriation of the nobility's property. He joined the Mongolian People's Revolutionary Party (MPRP) in 1930, and graduated from the MPRP Higher Party School. Between 1932 and 1938, he served as a political commissar in the Mongolian People's Revolutionary Army, which was fighting uprisings against the government's policies. Damba held the rank of commissar at the battalion, regiment, and division levels.

In 1938, Damba was elected first secretary of the Ömnögovi provincial MPRP committee. In July 1939, he was elected a member of the MPRP Presidium, and was involved in the arrest of revolutionary and deputy interior minister Darizavyn Losol in a plot led by dictator Khorloogiin Choibalsan. During Choibalsan's 1940 purge of secretary Banzarjavyn Baasanjav, Damba was implicated, but Choibalsan had the charges dropped. Though not part of Choibalsan's inner circle, Damba was reelected to the presidium in April 1940 as Yumjaagiin Tsedenbal took power as MPRP general secretary. During World War II, Damba helped organize Mongolian aid for the Red Army and was awarded the Soviet Order of the Red Banner of Labour. He became a candidate member of the MPRP Politburo in 1943 and was re-elected as a member of the Politburo at the 11th Congress in December 1947 and as second secretary of the MPRP Central Committee from 1947 to 1954.

== First Secretary of the MPRP ==
Dashiin Damba in the early 1950s

After Choibalsan's death in 1952, the MPRP, following the example of the Soviet Communist Party following the 1953 death of Joseph Stalin, moved to devolve political power away from a single strongman and instead institute a system of collective leadership. Damba, who was also a member of the presidium of the People's Great Khural, replaced Tsedenbal (who remained premier) as general secretary at MPRP Central Committee plenum in April 1954, whose results were confirmed at the 12th MPRP Congress in November 1954.

In 1954, Damba secured the passage of a resolution at a session of the Party Central Committee's Bureau (Politburo) establishing a commission to investigate the so-called "Port Arthur Case". As a result, the relevant Mongolian officials were prosecuted and the surviving victims were released.

Damba’s tenure as first secretary saw the establishment of formal diplomatic relations with India in 1955, the first time a non-communist country had recognized Mongolia’s independence. Relations with China also improved, especially after Damba met personally with Mao Zedong in September 1956 in Beijing to discuss Chinese aid to Mongolia. When relations between the two countries deteriorated a year later, Damba would be accused of being "pro-Chinese". In 1956, during the period of de-Stalinization in the USSR under Nikita Khrushchev, a special commission headed by Bazaryn Shirendev was formed to re-evaluate the country's Stalinist purges under Choibalsan. Damba supported giving the commission top-secret Interior Ministry files, but Tsedenbal was opposed. He tried to arrest Shirendev as an "imperialist spy" in 1957, but Damba persuaded him to drop the charges.

The Soviet-educated Tsedenbal viewed Damba as a "backward" man who shirked work to visit the countryside, was not a reader, and did not write his own speeches. At a Central Committee plenum in November 1958, shortly after his re-election by the 13th MPRP Congress in March, Damba was "relieved of his duties at his own request". He was demoted to second secretary, and replaced as first secretary by Tsedenbal. On the 2 April 1959, it was reported that Damba was dismissed from the secretariat and the Politburo for "profound ideological-political backwardness, conservatism, and inertia" and for "opportunist tolerance of distortions and shortcomings". This paralleled the events in the USSR, where first secretary Khrushchev had taken over the premiership for himself.

== Later life and death ==
Damba was sent to work as the director of the Ikh-Uul District tractor station in Khövsgöl Province. From January 1962, he served as deputy director of the Higher School of Agriculture for 15 years. Damba is believed to have died in 1989. In November 1990, a plenum of the MPRP Central Committee declared the political charges against him unfounded. In December 2008, Ulanbaatar's Sükhbaatar District Court declared him a victim of political repression.

== Notes ==
Party political offices
Preceded by Bat-Ochiryn Eldev-Ochir; Dorjjavyn Luvsansharav	Secretary of the Mongolian People's Revolutionary Party; 4 July 1939 – 8 April 1940; Served alongside: Banzarjavyn Baasanjav	Succeeded by Yumjaagiin Tsedenbal (as General Secretary)
Preceded by Yumjaagiin Tsedenbal	First Secretary of the Mongolian People's Revolutionary Party; 4 April 1954 – 22 November 1958	Succeeded by Yumjaagiin Tsedenbal
