= Tsogt-Ochiryn Lookhuuz =

Mongolian state farm official (1923–2018)

Tsogt-Ochiryn Lookhuuz

Tsogt-Ochiryn Lookhuuz (Mongolian: Цогт-Очирын Лоохууз; 1923 – 14 May 2018) was a Mongolian state farm official. He was a member of the ruling Mongolian People's Revolutionary Party, and head of the Chief Directorate of State Farms from 1956 to 1962. In 1964, Lookhuuz was dismissed and exiled by leader Yumjaagiin Tsedenbal.

== Biography ==
Tsogt-Ochiryn Lookhuuz was born in 1923 in Chandmani District, Govi-Altai Province. In 1942, he graduated from the Ulanbaataar Finance Technical School, followed by the Mongolian Higher School for New Cadres in 1944, and the Soviet Communist Party Central Committee's Higher Party School in Moscow in 1953. Lookhuuz worked at the Ulanbaatar city committee of the Mongolian People's Revolutionary Party, then was head of the Marxism–Leninism section of the MPRP Central Committee until 1954, when he was appointed as the first secretary of the Govi-Altai provincial MPRP committee. Between 1956 and 1962, Lookhuuz was head of the Chief Directorate of State Farms (during the campaign to cultivate Mongolia's "virgin lands") and the first deputy minister of agriculture (for livestock raising). In 1962, he traveled to Moscow to study for a higher degree at the Timiryazev Academy of Agriculture.

In December 1964, Lookhuuz returned to Ulaanbaatar to attend that month's MPRP Central Committee Plenum. Leader Yumjaagiin Tsedenbal accused Lookhuuz of being a member of an "anti-party" group with Baldandorjiin Nyambuu, Bandiin Surmaajav, Altangereliin Dashnamjil, Namjilyn Gungaajav, and Dashiin Damdinsüren. By decree of the Council of Ministers in January 1965, they were exiled to various places in the countryside for 25 years. Lookhuuz became a shepherd and pig farmer in Kharkhorin District, Övörkhangai Province from 1965 to 1976, and was then imprisoned at Züünkharaa in Selenge Province for six years before spending eight years in Bayanzürkh District, Khövsgöl Province. He was rehabilitated in 1990, and received restitution for his confiscated property and 25 years' back wages. Lookhuuz was elected an MPRP deputy to the People's Great Khural for Govi-Altai 144 in July 1990, and became deputy chairman in November 1991. He died on 14 May 2018.
