= Bazaryn Shirendev =

Mongolian historian and politician (1911–2001)

Bazaryn Shirendev

Bazaryn Shirendev (Note: Also spelled Shirendew or Shirendyb) (Mongolian: Базарын Ширэндэв; 16 May 1911 – 8 March 2001) was a Mongolian historian and politician. He was a member of the Central Committee of the ruling Mongolian People's Revolutionary Party from 1947 to 1982 and a member of its Politburo from 1954 to 1958. He was the first president of the Mongolian Academy of Sciences from 1961 to 1982, when he was ousted by leader Yumjaagiin Tsedenbal. Shirendev wrote official histories of Mongolia, including History of the Mongolian People's Revolution and Bypassing Capitalism.

== Biography ==
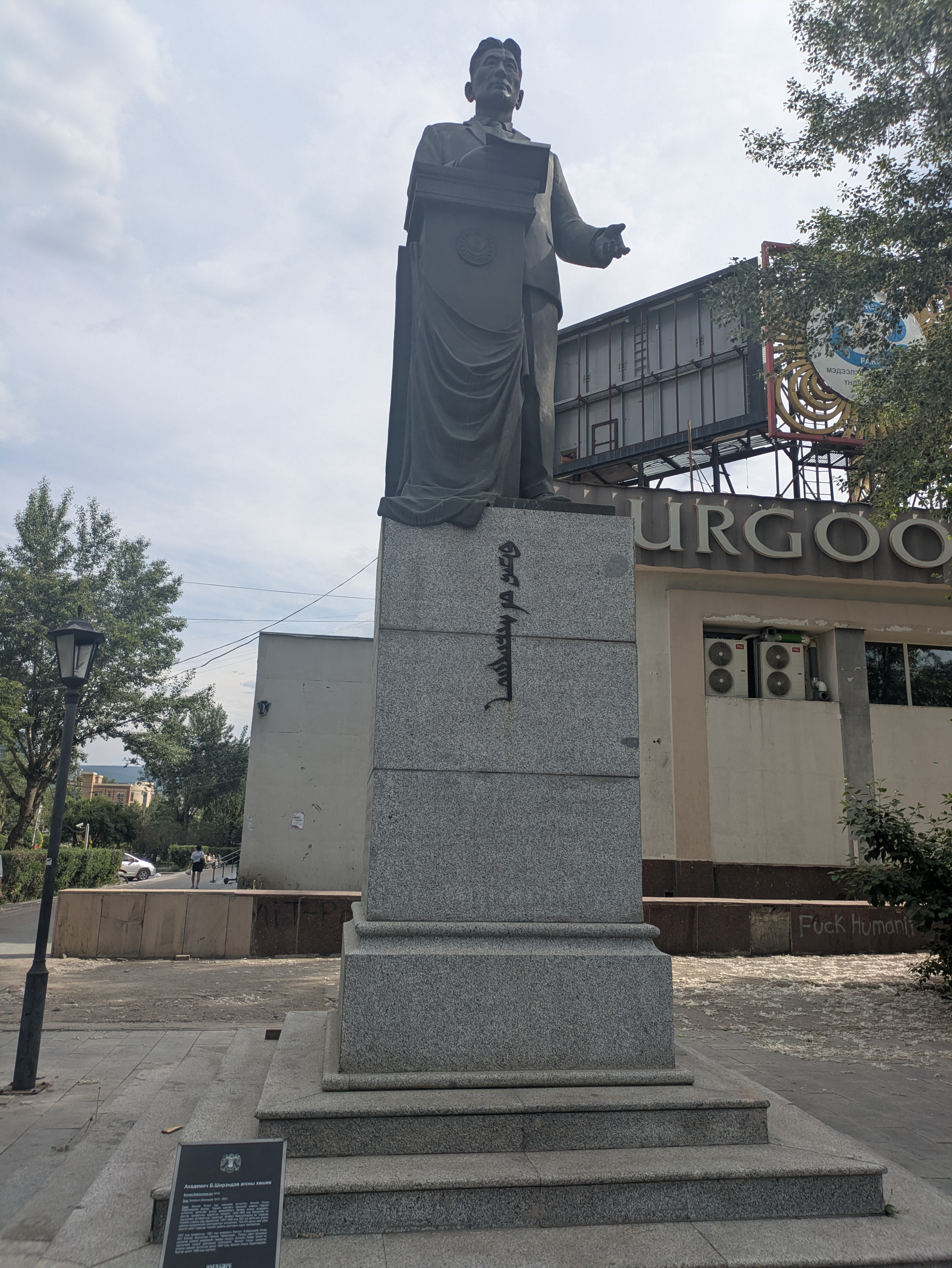
Statue of Shirendev near the National University of Mongolia

Bazaryn Shirendev was born on 16 May 1911 in Dalai Choinkhor Wang banner (later Shine-Ider District, Khövsgöl Province), the sixth of 13 children. He was sent to the Nükht Monastery school in 1923 but ran away twice until his father hired him out as a herder; in 1928, he earned a place at the first secular school in the province as a student of the local Mongolian People's Revolutionary Party representative, which set him on the path to become a cadre. Shirendev continued his studies for two years at Tsetserleg Agricultural School. In 1930, he began working as the manager of the Chuluut District commune, and in 1932 was sent to the Mongolian Workers' Faculty in Ulan-Ude, the capital of the Buryat ASSR. He later studied at the Lunacharsky Institute in Moscow and in the history faculty of the Teacher Training Institute in Irkutsk. He married a Russian woman, Zina, and had two sons and a daughter.

On returning to Mongolia in 1941, Shirendev was appointed as a reference assistant to Khorloogiin Choibalsan and worked in the Gobi areas. In 1943, he was sent back to Moscow to study the Soviet Communist Party's war-time work. In 1945–1946 he interpreted for Choibalsan at meetings with Soviet leader Joseph Stalin. Shirendev was secretary of the MPRP's propaganda department from 1944 to 1948 (when he was dismissed after being blamed for popular dissatisfaction with government policies), the second rector of the Mongolian State University from 1944 to 1953 or 1954, minister of education and deputy chairman of the Council of Ministers in charge of culture from 1951 to 1954, and first deputy chairman of the Council of Ministers to 1957. He was elected a candidate member of the MPRP Politburo and secretary of the Central Committee in December 1947, and was elected a full member of the politburo from November 1954 to March 1958. He also served as the chairman of the Mongolian Peace Committee (1950–1957). Shirendev was a member of the State Little Khural (1949–1951) when he was elected an MPRP deputy to the People's Great Khural, to which he was reelected until 1982. He was also deputy chairman (speaker) of the Great Khural in the 1960s and 1970s. He was reelected to the central committee at several congresses from 1966 to 1981.

While chairing a special commission re-evaluating the Stalin-era purges, Yumjaagiin Tsedenbal, who had taken power in 1952, tried to arrest Shirendev as a spy. Warned by party general secretary Dashiin Damba, Shirendev withdrew from government work and obtained a doctorate in Far Eastern studies at the Institute of Oriental Studies in Moscow in 1957–1960. He returned to Mongolia, and in July 1960 became chairman of the Committee of Science and Higher Education, then was elected as a member of the newly established Academy of Sciences and its president in 1961. Shirendev was chairman of the Permanent Committee of the International Congress of Mongolists from 1970 to 1982, and wrote books expressing the official views on Mongolian history, including Mongolia on the Boundary of the 19th and 20th Centuries, History of the Mongolian People’s Revolution, and Bypassing Capitalism, which were translated into several foreign languages. Shirendev received an honorary doctor of letters degree from the University of Leeds, England, in May 1970.

Shirendev's effort to make the academy an institution pursuing original research in all fields conflicted with Tsedenbal's agenda of having it simply apply the results of Soviet research to Mongolia. Although he was officially described as a "renowned scientist and brilliant and talented organizer and administrator", Shirendev was ousted from all positions and the academy's presidency in January 1982 on Tsedenbal's orders, for his alleged "lack of principle and party spirit". After Tsedenbal's fall from power in 1984, Shirendev was a counselor at the academy's Institute of Oriental Studies. In 1991, after democratization, the party reversed its criticism of Shirendev, and he published his memoirs and a historical novel about the 1921 revolution. He died on 8 March 2001.

A statue of Shirendev is located opposite the National University of Mongolia's Building #2.
