= Daramyn Tömör-Ochir =

Mongolian politician and scholar (1921–1985)

- Дарамын Төмөр-Очир
- Born: 1921; Lün, Töv Province
- Died: 2 October 1985 (aged 63–64)
- Cause of death: Murder
- Occupations: politician, scholar

Daramyn Tömör-Ochir (Mongolian: Дарамын Төмөр-Очир; 1921 – 2 October 1985) was a Mongolian politician and scholar of Marxism–Leninism. A graduate of Moscow State University, he served as the secretary for ideology of the central committee of the ruling Mongolian People's Revolutionary Party and a member of its Politburo from 1958 to 1962, when he was expelled on orders of Mongolia's leader Yumjaagiin Tsedenbal for trying "to inflame nationalist passions" after his role in organizing national celebrations for the 800th birthday of Genghis Khan. Tömör-Ochir was later murdered in October 1985.

== Early life and education ==
Daramyn Tömör-Ochir was born in 1921 in Lün District, Töv Province. He was orphaned as a child, and from age 15 hired himself out to shear wool and do other odd jobs. He attended a Soviet vocational school and graduated from the Communist University of Toilers of the East in 1941; he later became an early graduate of the Mongolian State University. After working for a time as an aide to Yumjaagiin Tsedenbal, he was appointed a lecturer at the New Cadres' Higher School of the Mongolian People’s Revolutionary Party. From 1945, he studied at the Moscow State University, graduating with a degree in philosophy (i.e. Marxism–Leninism) in 1950, before going on to the Academy of Social Sciences of the Soviet Communist Party Central Committee. Also in 1950, as one of Mongolia's noted new intellectuals, Tömör-Ochir signed his name to a collective letter questioning whether Mongolia could build socialism without joining the Soviet Union. This letter led to an investigation by Mongolian leader Khorloogiin Choibalsan and his more nationalist associates (though Tsedenbal, who became leader in 1952, supported Tömör-Ochir in the investigation). In 1953, Tömör-Ochir defended his master's degree in philosophy from Moscow State University and in 1957 gained the title of "professor" (rare in Mongolia's Soviet-based academic system).

== Political career ==
Tömör-Ochir was appointed head of a department at the Higher Party School, and in 1955 became the first director of the MPRP Institute of Party History. He assisted Tsedenbal's 1956 criticism of intellectuals, and wrote a 1959 article which attacked Byambyn Rinchen for his "nationalism". He was a secretary for ideology of the MPRP Central Committee and a member of the Politburo from 1958, as well as a member of the presidium of the People's Great Khural from 1960. In 1961, Tömör-Ochir was elected a member of the Mongolian Academy of Sciences. Tsedenbal began to view him as an unstable individualist being taken in by "nationalism"; indeed, Tömör-Ochir completely repudiated his previous support for unification with the Soviet Union, and in 1962 sought to have his 1956 and 1959 criticisms withdrawn. Tsedenbal was later infuriated by a party-historical textbook authored by Tömör-Ochir which frankly identified the non-Marxist nature of the early MPRP. Tömör-Ochir then fell ill and left for treatment to China, where he was in contact with the Chinese Communist Party.

In February 1962, he was assigned by the Politburo the task of organizing the national celebrations of the 800th birth anniversary of Genghis Khan on 31 May of that year. With preparations in full swing (a set of Genghis Khan anniversary postage stamps had been printed, and a monument for Genghis Khan's birthplace completed), the Soviet Communist Party newspaper Pravda published a fierce attack on Genghis Khan and the "Mongol–Tatar" empire, which had placed Russia under its “yoke” for centuries. The politburo canceled the celebration and issued a new negative evaluation of Genghis Khan. On 10 September, Tömör-Ochir was dismissed from the politburo and secretariat for alleged intrigue against other party leaders, being a "careerist", and trying "to create an unhealthy mood in public opinion and to inflame nationalist passions". He was particularly denounced for organizing the celebrations, despite the fact that they were ordered by a resolution signed by Tsedenbal, Jamsrangiin Sambuu, and six other politburo members and candidate members. In Sambuu's autobiography, he claimed that Tömör-Ochir was in reality expelled over differences in opinion over Mongolia's role in the Sino-Soviet split.

== Later life ==
Tömör-Ochir asked for a chance to translate Karl Marx's Das Kapital into Mongolian, but was instead made head of a construction office in Bayankhongor Province. He found a new job in the Ulaanbaatar education office before being discovered in 1965, upon which he was expelled from the party and briefly jailed. He was exiled to Khankh in Khövsgöl Province, and returned to Ulaanbaatar for medical reasons before moving to Darkhan in 1968, where he was under constant surveillance. Tömör-Ochir became the director of the town museum, named "Friendship", while his wife Ninjbadgar, an astronomer, taught at the polytechnic institute.

== Murder ==
After Tsedenbal's fall from power in 1984, his wife delivered an appeal to Ulaanbaatar for reconsideration of his case; while she was away, Tömör-Ochir was brutally murdered with an axe in his apartment on 2 October 1985. The murderer was never apprehended. He was politically rehabilitated by the MPRP Central Committee in March 1990. Some Mongols believed in a conspiracy and called for a new investigation of the murder, especially after the murder of Sanjaasürengiin Zorig on the anniversary of his death in 1998. A memorial plaque on the wall of his Darkhan flat was unveiled in 2002.

According to his grandson T.Erdenebileg, Tömör-Ochir had been removed from state surveillance roughly two years before the killing, however, he and his family were not informed of this action. A Ministry of Public Security aide sent by then-minister A. Jamsranjav to assess the state of the investigation shortly after the murder reported back in writing. However, A. Jamsranjav, after reading and destroying the report, instructed the aide to discuss it with no one. Erdenebileg also recounted a claim, relayed to him by a Soviet criminal investigator who had assisted Mongolian authorities, that Mongolian investigators had deliberately left the inquiry incomplete. He said he separately overheard, while serving as a member of the State Great Khural (parliament), an exchange among Darkhan police officers that he interpreted as an oblique acknowledgment that domestic security personnel themselves may have been implicated in the killing.

== See also ==
- List of solved missing person cases (1980s)
