= China–Mongolia relations =

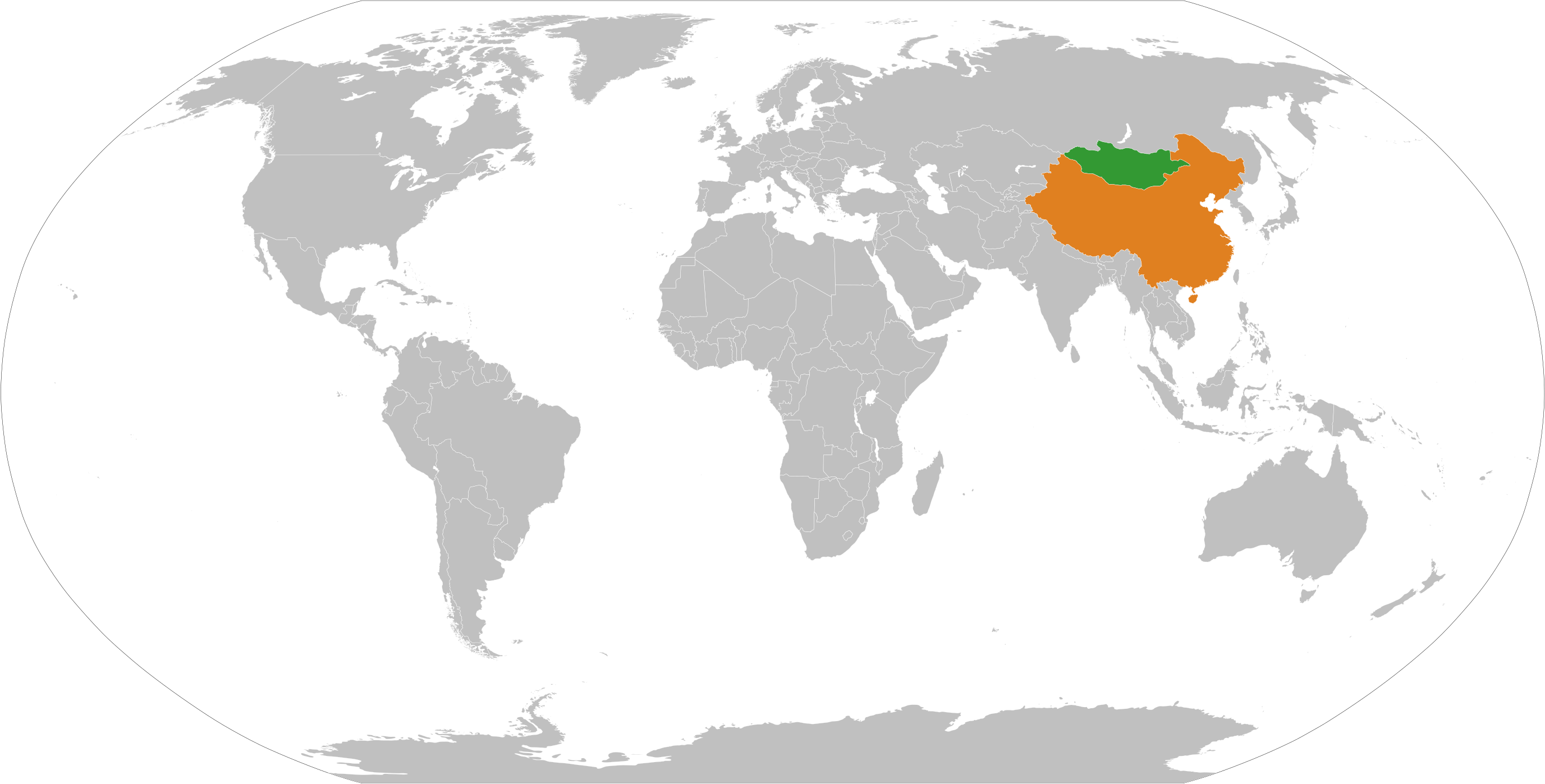

- Mongolia: China

Diplomatic mission
- Embassy of Mongolia, Beijing: Embassy of China, Ulaanbaatar

Envoy
- Ambassador Tuvshin Badral: Ambassador Shen Minjuan

Diplomatic relations between People's Republic of China and Mongolia were formally established in October 1949. During the Cold War, relations were determined by the relations between China and the Soviet Union, Mongolia's other neighbour and main ally until early 1990. With the rapprochement between the USSR and China in the late 1980s, Chinese-Mongolian relations also began to improve. Since the 1990s, China has become Mongolia's biggest trading partner, and a number of Chinese businesses operate in Mongolia.

== Background ==
=== Historical ===
The Han and Mongol (as well as their ancestors, the Proto-Mongols) peoples have been in contact with each other for millennia.

Throughout history, polities in the Central Plains and the Mongolian Plateau have had complicated relations. The Great Wall of China was constructed to ward off attacks by nomads from the north, notably during the Han and Ming dynasties. The Tang dynasty, following its defeat of the Xueyantuo, established the Protectorate General to Pacify the North in 647 to rule the Mongolian Plateau.

In 1271, the Mongols under Kublai Khan, grandson of Genghis Khan, established the Yuan dynasty as a Chinese dynasty and conquered all of China proper in 1279. In 1368, the Ming dynasty successfully overthrew the Yuan dynasty and the remnant Yuan imperial court was forced to retreat north, thereby forming the Northern Yuan.

The Ming Great Wall was strengthened and the period was characterized by repeated Ming raids into Northern Yuan territory and vice versa. During the transition from Ming to Qing, the last monarch of all Mongols Ligdan Khan allied with the Ming against the Qing dynasty until Ligdan was defeated by Qing forces and Inner Mongolia was conquered by the Manchus in 1635. In 1644, the Ming dynasty was overthrown by peasant rebels under Li Zicheng, who established the short-lived Shun dynasty which would soon be defeated by the Qing dynasty. After 1691, Outer Mongolia were incorporated into the Qing empire during the Dzungar–Qing Wars.

=== Republic of China ===
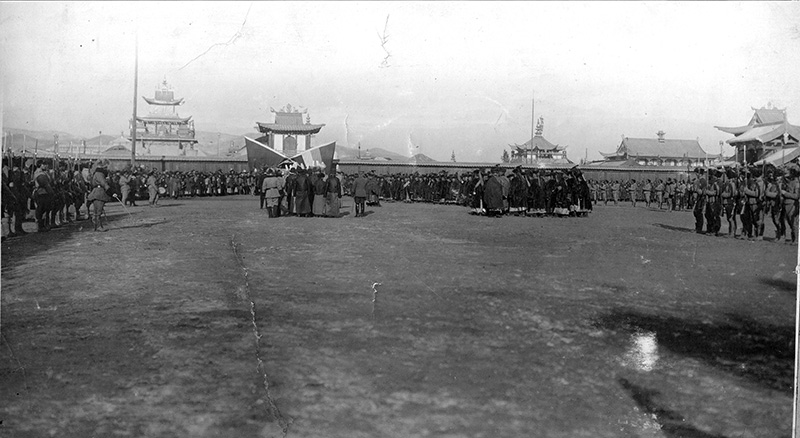
Ceremony of the destruction of Mongolia's autonomy in 1920

Bogd Khanate in Outer Mongolia declared its independence in 1911 after more than 200 years of Qing rule. The Republic of China was established in 1912 after the fall of the Qing dynasty. During this period, the Beiyang government of the Republic of China, as the successor to the Qing, claimed Outer Mongolia as Chinese territory. This claim was provided for in the Imperial Edict of the Abdication of the Qing Emperor signed by the Empress Dowager Longyu on behalf of the six-year-old Xuantong Emperor: "[...] the continued territorial integrity of the lands of the five races, Manchu, Han, Mongol, Hui, and Tibetan into one great Republic of China" ([...] 仍合滿、漢、蒙、回、藏五族完全領土，為一大中華民國). However, the Chinese government lacked any stable control over the region due to massive civil wars in the south and the rise of regional warlords in the Warlord Era. Consequently, Outer Mongolia sought Russian support to claim its independence. In 1919, Chinese general Xu Shuzheng advanced into Outer Mongolia and annulled its independence. In 1921, Chinese forces were driven out by White Russian forces led by Baron Roman von Ungern-Sternberg. Some months later they were driven out by the Red Army of the Russian Soviet Federative Socialist Republic, the Far Eastern Republic and pro-Soviet Mongolian forces. In 1924, the Mongolian People's Republic was proclaimed. With the onset of the Second Sino-Japanese War, little effort was given to reestablish Chinese control over Outer Mongolia.

Following the end of World War II, the Republic of China, led by the Kuomintang, was forced to formally accept Outer Mongolian independence under Soviet pressure. Recognition of Mongolian independence was stipulated in the Sino-Soviet agreement of August 14, 1945. The Chinese government officially recognized Mongolian independence in January 1946. In 1949, the Chinese Communist Party won the Chinese Civil War and maintained the policy of recognizing Mongolia's independent status.

== Cold War ==
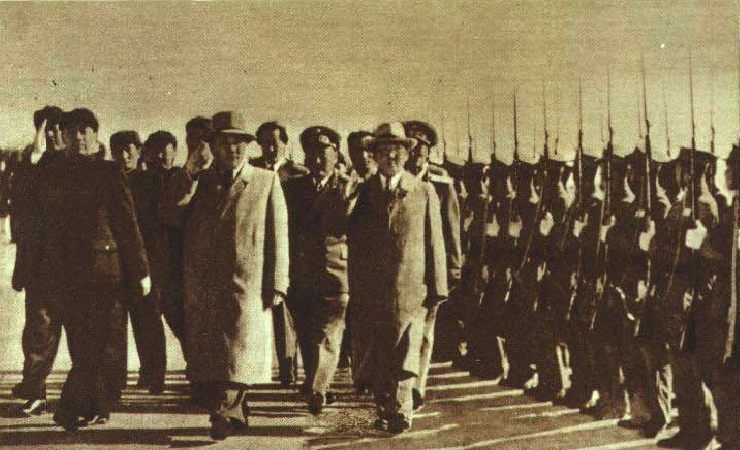
Yumjaagiyn Tsedenbal in Beijing in 1952

The People's Republic of China established diplomatic relations with Mongolia on October 16, 1949, and both nations signed a border treaty in 1962. With the Sino-Soviet split, Mongolia aligned itself with the Soviet Union and asked for the deployment of Soviet forces, leading to security concerns in China. There were political rhetoric from sections of the Chinese Communist Party (including remarks made by Mao Zedong in 1936) that Outer Mongolia would automatically become a part of a future Chinese federation, drawing suspicion from Marshal Khorloogiin Choibalsan. While a border treaty was signed between Mongolia and the People's Republic of China in 1962, it was used by Mongolian leader Yumjaagiin Tsedenbal to map out permanent boundaries between Mongolia and China. Tsedenbal was upset over Chinese workers in Mongolia, who had become rebellious and were declaring strikes. China, in response, curbed economic aid, and by 1964, pulled out its workers from the country. Mongolia then turned to the Soviet Union for protection. During the Cultural Revolution, Red Guards attacked and set the Mongolian ambassador's car on fire in Beijing.

As a result, bilateral ties remained tense until 1984, when a high-level Chinese delegation visited Mongolia and both nations started to survey and demarcate their borders. Mongolian General Secretary Jambyn Batmönkh, during a meeting with President Kim Il Sung while on a state visit to Pyongyang in November 1986 states that "renewing the development of China-Mongolian relations is important for our two countries’ people's common interest". In 1986, a series of agreements to bolster trade and establish transport and air links was signed. In 1988, both nations signed a treaty on border control. Mongolia also started a more independent policy and pursued more friendly ties with China.

== Recent period ==
Countries which signed cooperation documents related to the Belt and Road Initiative

In the post-Cold War era, China has taken major steps to normalise its relationship with Mongolia, emphasizing its respect for Mongolia's sovereignty and independence. In 1994, Chinese Premier Li Peng signed a treaty of friendship and cooperation. China has become Mongolia's biggest trade partner and source of foreign investment. Bilateral trade reached US$1.13 billion by the first nine months of 2007, registering an increase of 90% from 2006. China offered Mongolia permission to use the Port of Tianjin, allowing access to trade within the Asia Pacific region. China also expanded its investments in Mongolia's mining industries, giving it access to the country's natural resources.

Mongolia participates in the Belt and Road Initiative, which it joined in 2013. The BRI has been an important factor in the growing Mongolian view that China is an economic partner rather than a threat to its territorial integrity. Mongolia cooperates in the development of the China-Mongolia-Russia Economic Corridor, one of the six major land corridors of the BRI. In January 2024, Mongolia stated that it seeks to institute a summit where the three countries can further develop economic opportunities, including the corridor.

In January 2024, Mongolian Prime Minister Luvsannamsrai Oyun-Erdene described relations between Mongolia and China as at their highest level and described the two countries as working towards a comprehensive strategic partnership.

The Gashuunsukhait–Gantsmod railway is a 19.5 km cross-border extension of the existing Sino-Mongolian rail network, first proposed in 2009. In May 2025, Mongolia's parliament ratified a strategic partnership with China to construct the link, work formally beginning on 14 May 2025, with the aim of eliminating the need for truck haulage across the border. Once operational, the new connection was expected to increase annual coal transport capacity by 30 million tonnes, facilitate the expansion of the Tavan Tolgoi coal mine, and, if later integrated with the Khangi–Mandal and Shiveekhüren–Sekhen crossings, could raise Mongolia's total coal-export capacity to 120 million tonnes by 2030. Construction was set to be overseen by Mongolia's state-owned Erdenes-Tavantolgoi JSC and China Energy.

== Sovereignty issues ==
Mongolia follows the one China principle, and recognizes government of the People's Republic of China as the sole legal government representing the whole of China and Taiwan as "an inalienable part" of China. Mongolia also supports all efforts by the PRC to "achieve peaceful national reunification" and considers issues related to Hong Kong, Xinjiang and Tibet as internal affairs of China.

== Resident diplomatic missions ==
of China in Mongolia

- Ulaanbaatar (Embassy)
- Zamyn-Üüd (Consulate-General)

of Mongolia in China

- Beijing (Embassy)
- Hohhot (Consulate-General)
- Hong Kong (Consulate-General)
- Shanghai (Consulate-General)
- Erenhot (Consulate)
- Manzhouli (Consulate)

== See also ==
- China–Mongolia border
- Mongolia-Taiwan relations
- Battle of Baitag Bogd
- Vostok 2018
- 2015 China Victory Day Parade
