= China–Kyrgyzstan–Uzbekistan International Highway =

Network of roads of Asia

The China–Kyrgyzstan–Uzbekistan International Highway (CKU) is a transport corridor centered on Kyrgyzstan. It is envisioned to "interlink Pakistan, China and Kyrgyzstan, with strategic nodes extending to Uzbekistan, Tajikistan and Kazakhstan."

The corridor is a part of the Belt and Road Initiative and among the corridors and projects listed in a joint communiqué of state leaders attending the 2nd Belt and Road Initiative Forum in April 2019.

== Projects ==
One of the main projects contributing to the creation of the corridor is the North-South Alternative Road. The 250km highway is a shorter alternative to the existing highway from the Kyrgyz capital of Bishkek to Osh, the country's second city in the south. China Road and Bridge Corporation, the construction contractor for both phases began work in 2014 and completion is expected in 2021. The road is financed by an approximately US$700 million loan from the Export-Import Bank of China given on a concessional basis (low interest rate). The road has faced construction delays. CRBC personnel report exceeding difficult conditions in building the road including rainy weather sweeping away temporary bridges, construction of a high altitude tunnel over 3,000 meters, and segments built next to the torrential Naryn River.

== Routes ==
There is a truck line with regular service delivering freight through China, Kyrgyzstan, and Uzbekistan. The route starts from Kashgar and ends in Tashkent, passing through Irkeshtam and Osh in Kyrgyzstan and Andijan in Uzbekistan.
