= China–Georgia relations =

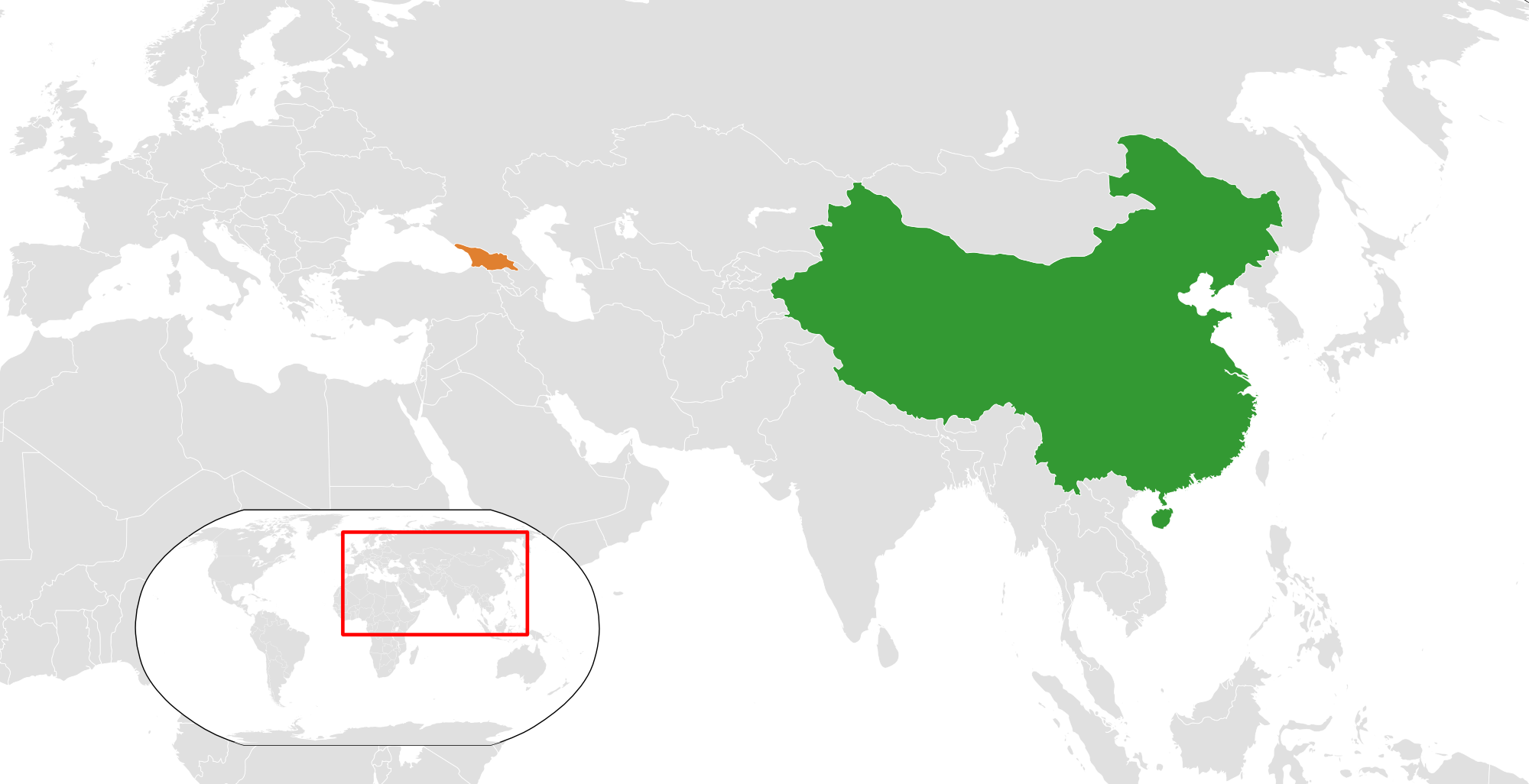
- China: Georgia

Diplomatic relations between the People's Republic of China and Georgia were established on 9 June 1992. Since then, bilateral ties have advanced gradually and mostly focused on economic cooperation. China has an embassy in Tbilisi, and Georgia has an embassy in Beijing. By 2017, China had become Georgia's fourth largest trading partner and the second largest exporting market for Georgian wine. China has been appreciative of Georgia's commitment to One-China policy. To maintain balanced relations with both Georgia and Russia, China does not recognize the independence of Abkhazia and South Ossetia. Currently, China relies on Georgia and its infrastructure for the China–Central Asia–West Asia Economic Corridor, which traverses the South Caucasus, linking China with Europe. As a result, China is cautious in its approach to South Caucasian geopolitics, striving to develop connections with all regional players and effectively implement its geostrategy. Georgia, for its part, has been increasingly attractive for China as a transportation hub and one of the shortest routes for Chinese goods on their way to the European Union. In 2023, China and Georgia formed a strategic partnership.

== History ==
The Yuan Shi, the official history of the Yuan dynasty of China, records the fate of Georgia in 1252. In that year, the Mongol khagan Möngke, who was expanding into China, granted the Kingdom of Georgia, which was then under Mongol control, to Berke. Chu'ü-erh-chih ([tɕʰỳ ǎɚʈʂɻ̩ɨ̀]; Chinese: 曲兒只), the Chinese name used for Georgia in the Yuan Shi, is etymologically the same as "Georgia".

== Political relations ==
The China–Georgia relations were officially established on 9 June 1992, when China extended its diplomatic recognition to the Republic of Georgia after the dissolution of the Soviet Union. Eduard Shevardnadze, then Georgia's head of state, paid a state visit to China in June 1993 and signed several agreements, principally on economic and trade cooperation. Mikheil Saakashvili, the then-President of Georgia, was in China on an official visit in April 2006.

The two countries maintained communication and coordination at the United Nations and other international organizations. Georgia follows the one China principle, and recognizes government of the People's Republic of China as the sole legal government representing the whole of China and Taiwan as "an inalienable part" of China. In its turn, China, member of the Shanghai Cooperation Organisation (SCO), refused to follow the suit of Russia, a fellow SCO member, in recognition of the independence of Georgia's breakaway Abkhazia and South Ossetia in the aftermath of the August 2008 Russo–Georgian War despite the appeal by the Russian Foreign Ministry. Instead, the SCO issued the Dushanbe Declaration, calling on all parties to solve the "existing problems" through diplomacy. Similarly, a Chinese Foreign Ministry spokesman expressed the agency's concern due to the "latest development in South Ossetia and Abkhazia", responding to a journalist's question regarding China's position on Russia's recognition of the disputed territories. In the view of the political analyst Joseph Larsen, "while China does not present an alternative to NATO and EU integration... relations with China have the potential to complement Georgia's existing foreign policy."

== Economic relations ==
Bilateral economic ties have gradually expanded since 1992 and witnessed further growth beginning in 2010 as Georgia's economy recovered from the 2008 war. In 2017, Georgia joined the Belt and Road Initiative, a project China launched in 2013 to "shorten the distance between China and Europe" through improved infrastructure connections.

By 2014, China had accounted for $217.94 million in foreign direct investment in Georgia, putting it in fourth place after Azerbaijan, the Netherlands, and the United States.

A number of Chinese companies have launched major operations in Georgia. China's Hualing Group, mainly focused on construction and management of hotels and trade centers, was Georgia's single largest foreign investor as of 2017. Some of the company's projects in Georgia include the Hualinge Hualing Free Industrial Zone in Kutaisi, Georgia's second largest city. The Hualinge Hualing Free Industrial zone is an important hub for Chinese manufacturers to access the European market. Hualing Group has also built a large residential and commercial complex in a suburb of the capital city of Tbilisi.

In January 2017, the CEFC China Energy agreed to purchase 75% of shares in the Free Industrial Zone at Poti on Georgia's Black Sea coastline. Georgia's main export product to China is wine, which amounted to 5,299,820 bottles in 2016, nearly double the amount exported in the previous year. In addition to wine, other significant exports from Georgia to China include copper ore and copper products. Significant Chinese exports to Georgia include mechanical products, electrical products, and steel.

On 13 May 2017, China and Georgia signed a free trade agreement.

In June 2023, Georgia passed a bill to allow Chinese citizens to travel to Georgia without a visa, further improving relations and diplomatic ties between two nations. Xi Jinping, the General Secretary of the Chinese Communist Party met with the Georgian Prime Minister, Irakli Garibashvili, discussing improvements in economic ties and marking "new stage" in relations between the two countries.

== See also ==
- Foreign relations of China
- Foreign relations of Georgia
- Georgia–Hong Kong relations
