= China–Mongolia–Russia Economic Corridor =

Part of the Belt and Road Initiative

The China–Mongolia–Russia Economic Corridor is one of the six major land corridors of China's global infrastructure development initiative, the Belt and Road Initiative.

== History ==
The China–Mongolia–Russia Economic Corridor is one of the six major land corridors of China's global infrastructure development initiative, the Belt and Road Initiative. Its goal is to increase infrastructural and economic ties between cities including Beijing, Ulaanbaatar, Novosibirsk, Omsk, Yekaterinburg, and Saint Petersburg.

The development of the corridor requires significant cooperation from Russia. Progress has been slowed following the 2022 Russian invasion of Ukraine and the subsequent deterioration of Russia-European Union Relations.

In January 2024, Mongolia stated that it was seeking to establish a China-Mongolia-Russia summit to coordinate economic development, including of the economic corridor.

== See also ==
- New Eurasian Land Bridge
- China-Indochina Peninsula economic corridor
- China–Central Asia–West Asia Economic Corridor
- BCIM Economic Corridor
- China–Pakistan Economic Corridor
