= Georgia–Hong Kong relations =

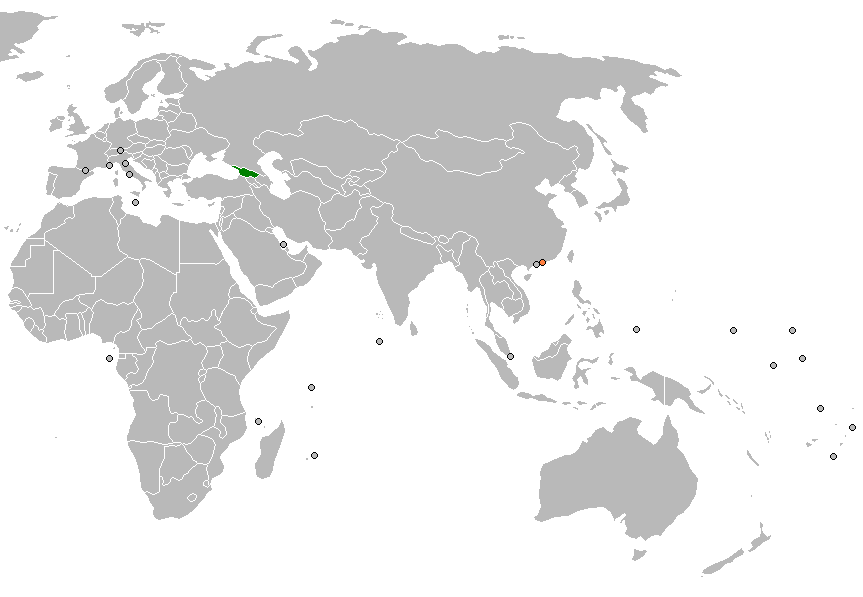
- Georgia: Hong Kong

Georgia–Hong Kong relations are bilateral relations between Georgia and Hong Kong.

Free Trade Agreements were negotiated between the two on May 9, 2016. The agreements with Georgia cover, among others, several key elements, including (a) elimination or reduction of tariffs, (b) liberalisation of non-tariff barriers, (c) flexible disciplines on rules of origin which would facilitate bilateral trade, (d) customs facilitation procedures, (e) liberalisation as well as promotion and protection of investment; (f) liberalisation of trade in services, and (g) the legal and institutional arrangement and dispute settlement mechanism for the FTA. The Government spokesman of Hong Kong suggested that Georgia was an emerging market and that the Free Trade Agreements will help expand Hong Kong's Free Trade Agreements network into the respective regions including Eurasia.

Both nations coexist in several international organizations. The relations between the two focus on economic, social and cultural aspects.

== See also ==
- Foreign relations of Georgia
- Foreign relations of Hong Kong
- China–Georgia relations
