= China and the World Bank =

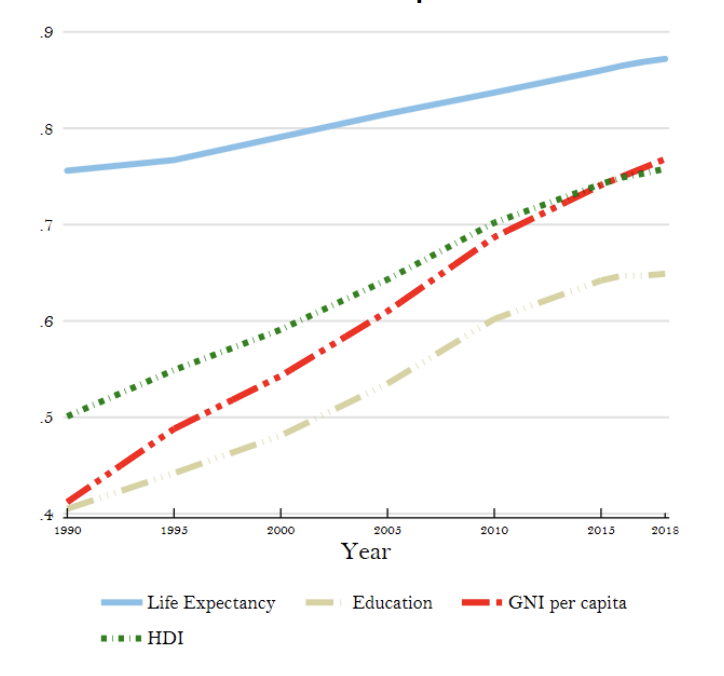
HDI of China since 1990

China originally joined the World Bank Group (WBG) on December 27, 1945. However, after the Chinese Civil War, the World Bank recognized the Republic of China as its member, until the relationship ended in 1980, when the membership was replaced by the People's Republic of China. The People's Republic of China (PRC) did not become involved with the World Bank group until 1980, when it first joined the World Bank in April due to the market reforms known as reform and opening up. Prior to the economic reform and its relation with the World Bank, according to CRS, "China maintained policies that kept the economy very poor, stagnant, centrally controlled, vastly inefficient, and relatively isolated from the global economy". Since its entry into the World Bank, China has transformed into a market-based economy and has experienced rapid economic and social development. Currently, although China has become the world's second largest economy with 1.4 billion population, it still has a close relationship with the World Bank in areas such as poverty, environmental protection and new challenges from the reform.

== History ==
=== China joining the World Bank ===
The partnership between China and the World Bank began on December 27, 1945, when it joined the organization. After the Communist victory in 1949 in the Chinese Civil War, the Chinese Communist Party proclaimed the People's Republic of China (PRC) on the mainland while the Republic of China (ROC) government retreated to the island of Taiwan, formerly a Japanese colony it acquired in 1945 after the end of hostiles in World War II. Both governments claimed to be the sole legitimate authority of the whole China leaving Taiwan's political status unclear.

Despite losing much of its territory, in 1967, the ROC loaned US$61 million from the World Bank to finance four projects: construction of US$14 million worth of tuna boats, US$15 million worth of railroad construction, US$15 million in loan funds for the China Development Corporation, and US$17 million for communications expansion. Subsequently, the Legislative Yuan passed all loans made by the World Bank and other international lending agencies for Taiwan development projects.

On October 25, 1971, the United Nations recognized the People's Republic of China as the sole legitimate government of China, removing the ROC from its membership. Subsequently, the World Bank changed China's representation from the ROC to the PRC on April 16, 1980. That same year, Chinese paramount leader Deng Xiaoping met the then president of the World Bank Robert McNamara, since then the World Bank began its dedication in assisting the PRC's economic development. The World Bank served as a catalytic role in kick-starting China's economic development, when the country initially received approval of its first project loan in 1981. These projects have primarily focused on financing technical assistance such as pension reform, urban housing reform, energy market reform, environmental protection, labor market development, social safety net development, interest rate liberalization and external trade liberalization. Also as important, the technical assistant from the World Bank in areas such as how to appraise and implement priority projects, how to encourage innovation and introduce new technologies, and how to develop institutions and policy instruments needed for good economic management. Since then, China has become one of the largest borrower of loans and recipient of technical assistant from the World Bank.

=== Relationship with the World Bank ===
Initially, China was a recipient of International Development Association (IDA), the Bank's low-income country arm, and received up to $9.95 billion in concessional loans until 1999. Later when China was categorized as middle-income country, it switched to International Bank for Reconstruction and Development (IBRD) as its main borrower, and had borrowed $39.8 billion until 2011. Currently China is categorized as an upper-middle-income country, and work with the World Bank mainly for funding small-scale projects. According to World Bank Group's Country Partnership Strategy, the bank's activity is classified under five pillars: "integrating China in the world economy; reducing poverty, inequality, and social exclusion; managing resource scarcity and environmental challenges; financing sustained and efficient growth; and improving public and market institutions". Since the opening up of this relationship, there has been many successes, which include China's economic performance since the market reforms of 1979, urbanization, social developments, and education and health services.

China has also been increasing its involvement in the World Bank's administration and contribution to the bank. As China grows in its economic power, it overtook large European nations in voting power at IBRD in 2010, with a jumping increase from 2.77% to 4.42%. In the end of 2019, China holds 5.05% of total votes in IBRD, behind United States (16.37%) and Japan (8.21%), while having more voting power than Germany (4.3%), UK (4%), France (4%), and India (3.11%). As of 2019, China has 2 out of 32 management members on the World Bank leadership. Financially, in 2016, China approved its first SDR bond issuer to IBRD by People's Bank of China, to serve its increasing involvement in international finances.

China is increasing not only its involvement in the World Bank's administration and its contribution but also its aid in Africa and has developed a different approach from the World Bank. On the one side, World bank represents a traditional multilateral organization which provides aid on conditions of political freedom and human rights. On the other side, China represents an immerging new organization that generally provides aid with no conditions and emphasize stability as a crucial threshold for continuing investment. While World Bank's aid has promoted reduced crime and more democracy in African recipient countries, China's aid has promoted more security force and more autocracy in African recipient countries.

With China's power increasing over the years, it seeks to transform its role from an acceptor internalizing itself into the status quo of world financial system to a challenger breaking the current hegemony of the World Bank. China created the China Eximbank in 1994 and since then it has been making growing contributions to international finance system as a state-funded and state-owned policy bank, turning itself into an alternative to aid other countries except the World Bank. It is not willing to merely listen to the World Bank when it comes to setting up the conditions of the multi-donor aid packages and instead set up its own rules. It also advocates for the changing of norms within the World Bank such as the lending rules.

== Project in China ==
From 1999 to 2011, China borrowed near $40 billion from the IBRD. Up until December 2019, there is a total of 97 ongoing projects in China by World Bank, with $12 billion committed amount of funding. Among them are primarily projects regarding to transportation, public administration, water sanitation&waste, agriculture, industry&trade, and energy&extractives. Within the World Bank Group, China is one of the largest loan-taking countries. From 2016 to 2018, China was the second largest borrower with $6.19 billion in loans, a number less than India ($8.05 billion) and more than Egypt ($5.23 billion). As China's development solidifies, the World Bank has since shifted its objectives, and focusing on involvements that would support greener growth and sustainable energy, promote more inclusive development in all regions, and advance mutually beneficial relations with the world.

=== IDA (International Development Association) ===
In 1981, IDA provided $200 million as its first loan to China for higher education, since then IDA has involved with a catalytic role in China's modernization. By 2007, China was becoming a contributing partner by providing finance and policy input through the replenishment process. China has graduated from IDA in the fiscal year of 1999, and as September 2019, China shares a 2.25% of IDA votes for its increasing role in the IDA finance contribution and technical assistant.

=== IFC (International Finance Corporation) ===
Since its first investment in 1985, the International Finance Corporation (IFC) has invested and activated over $13.4 billion to support over 390 projects across 30 provinces, in which as of July 2017, IFC has committed $3.6 billion in China's portfolio. IFC invest and mobilize capital for private sector projects which supports sustainable economic development in China, particularly those that help mitigate climate change, promotes balanced rural-urban development, and promote sustainable investments in emerging markets.

=== MIGA (Multilateral Investment Guarantee Agency) ===
Created in 1988, MIGA encourages foreign direct investment in developing nations by providing political risk insurance to foreign investors and lenders, while also providing strategies for countries to attract and retain foreign direct investments. Since 2000s, MIGA has been providing guarantees for investments into China, particularly for projects that involve sub-sovereign risk, such as water and waste. Meanwhile, MIGA also supports its Chinese partners with their outward investments abroad, including both private lenders and governmental administration.

=== Health VIII Project ===
Created in 1998 and lasted until 2007, the Health VIII Project aimed to increase the overall health quality in seven provinces in China by increasing people's access to healthcare, lowering health spending, and improving the quality of health care provided in village clinics and township health centers. In a research study published by the World Bank accessing the impacts of the project in the Gansu province in China, the researchers found that the project had increased the number of doctor's visit 1.4 by average one year and lower the catastrophic expenses. However, the medicine expenses were the same and the immunization rate of the children was in fact lower, maybe because the project has advantaged the township health centers but disadvantaged the village clinics, which is the main force vaccinating children.

== Involvement and Controversies ==
=== China's involvement in international finance ===
In 2012 at the fourth BRICS summit, the leaders of Brazil, Russia, India, China and South Africa considered the possibility of setting up a new Development Bank to mobilize resources for infrastructure and sustainable development projects in BRICS and other emerging economies, as well as in developing countries. In 2016, the New Development Bank (NDB) became fully operational and has approved loans involving financial assistance of over $3.4 billion for projects in the areas of green and renewable energy, transportation, water sanitation, irrigation and other areas.

In 2016, China projected Asian Infrastructure Investment Bank (AIIB) as a "multilateral development bank with a mission to improve social and economic outcomes in Asia". As of 2019, it has over 100 members, a co-financing framework with the World Bank and partnership with ADB, ADF, ADB, EDB, EBRD, EIB, IADB, IAIC, IsDBG, and NDB.

In 2013, China proposed the Belt and Road Initiative (BRI), a transcontinental development project that includes 1/3 of world trade and GDP and over 60% of the world's population. According to World Bank, the string of infrastructure investment could "lift 32 million people out of moderate poverty conditions if implemented fully". However, as the World Bank report suggest, the cost of project might out-weigh the economic benefits, while there has been a lack of transparency.

In 2017, China, the World Bank, and other international development funding bodies signed a BRI memorandum of understanding, which provides for collaboration on developing sustainable financial mechanisms, coordination and capacity building, and transparency of funding terms.

=== Controversies of World Bank projects ===
One highly controversial World Bank Project was the Gansu and Inner Mongolia Poverty Reduction Project in 1999, which included a 40-meter dam that was projected to displace around 60,000 inhabitants within Qinghai Province. This led to the World Bank ruling to withdraw funding for this section of the project to stop this controversial debate. In the year 2000, the World Bank also stopped the China Western Poverty Reduction project that was originally going to resettle over 58,000 Chinese farmers into Tibet. After reports were released by inspection panel, the project was forced to be withdrawn because reports indicated that the World Bank violated social and environmental policies.
