= Belt and Road Forum for International Cooperation =

International forum in China

The Belt and Road Forum for International Cooperation (also known as the Belt and Road Forum or BRFIC) is an international political and economic forum of the Belt and Road Initiative.

The forum will be a platform for working out action plans for implementation of the initiative in the areas of infrastructure, energy and resources, production capacity, trade and investment and identification of major projects. It is also intended to be an opportunity for the signing of cooperation agreements with countries and international organizations in the areas of financial cooperation mechanism; a cooperation platform for science, technology and environmental protection; and enhanced exchanges and training of talent and financing agreements for backing projects.

== 2017 ==
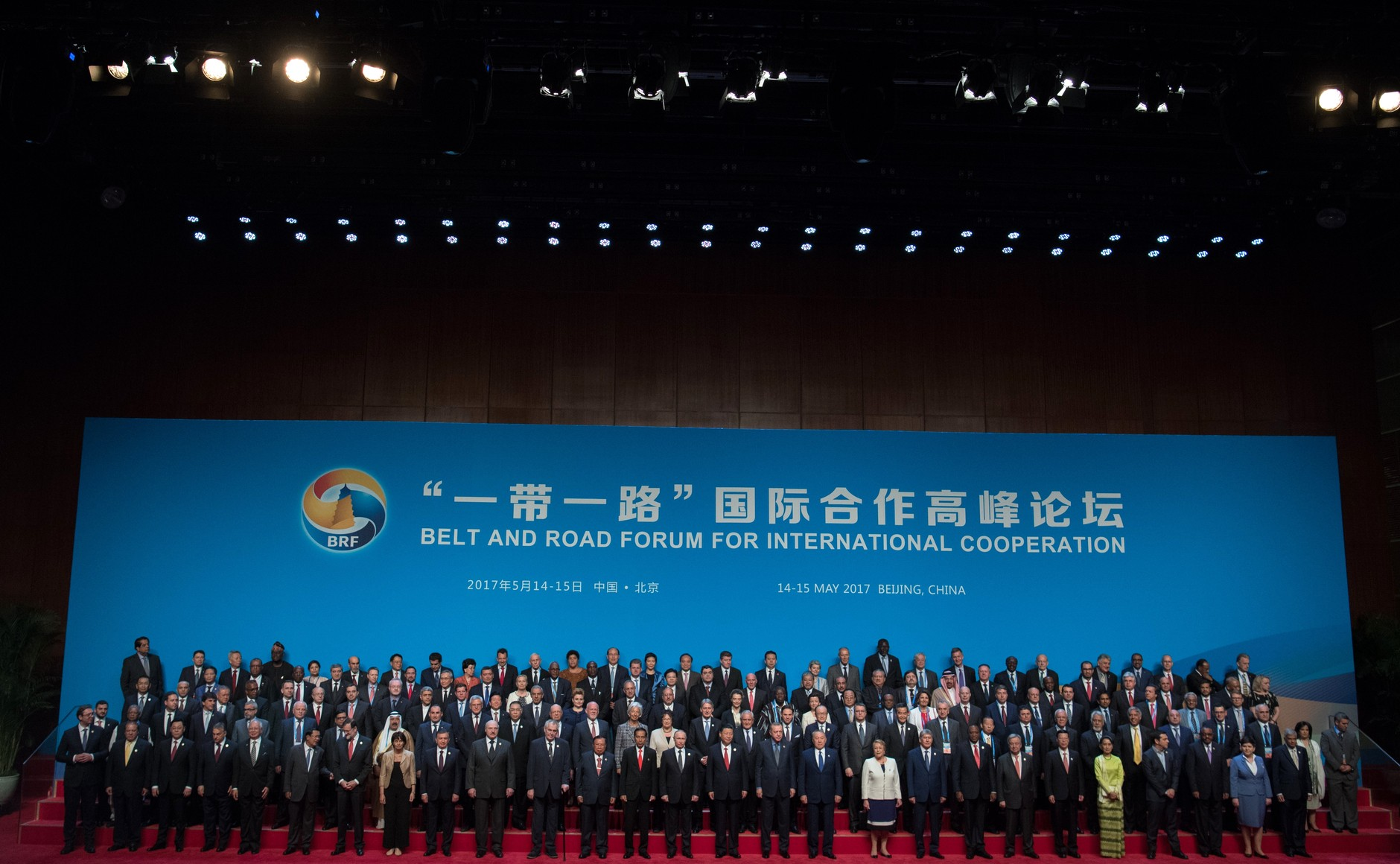
Participants of the 1st Belt and Road Forum held in 2017

The first event was on 14 and 15 May 2017 in Beijing, and drew 29 foreign heads of state and government and representatives from more than 130 countries and 70 international organizations.

The purpose of the forum is described by Wang Xiaotao, deputy head of the National Development and Reform Commission, in an interview with Xinhua as building "a more open and efficient international cooperation platform; a closer, stronger partnership network; and to push for a more just, reasonable and balanced international governance system." Western media coverage portrayed the forum in a similar way with CNN referring to the event under the headline "China's new world order" and the Los Angeles Times running the article "Globalization 2.0: How China's two-day summit aims to shape a new world order".

== 2019 ==
A second Belt and Road Forum was held from 25 to 27 April 2019 in Beijing. Thirty-seven heads of state attended the second BRFIC, as did about five thousand other representatives.

The second forum identified 283 projects, agreements, or initiatives proceeding under the BRI.

Initiatives introduced during the forum included the Third Market Cooperation Mechanism, the Green Lighting Action Initiative, the Green and High-Efficiency Cooling Action Initiative, and the Sustainable Debt Analysis Framework. China's Ministry of Ecology and Environment established the BRI International Green Development Coalition as a joint project with the environmental agencies of twenty-five other countries. Environmental agencies also proposed establishing green technology diffusion centers. The Ministry of Science and Technology launched new innovation and exchange programs.

At the forum, the Chinese Academy of Sciences announced new scholarship programs for students from countries participating in the BRI.

== 2023 ==
A third forum was held from 17 to 19 October 2023. At the Forum, China signed hundreds of BRI-related agreements, with a focus on green technology (as well as digital commerce).
