= List of ambassadors of Mongolia to China =

Coordinates: 39.911353°N 116.445883°E

Ambassador of Mongolia to the People's Republic of China
- Incumbent; Tuvshin Badral since September 29, 2020
- Inaugural holder: Bayaryn Jargalsaikhan
- Formation: July 1, 1950

The Mongolian ambassador in Beijing is the official representative of the Government in Ulaanbaatar to the Government of the People's Republic of China

== List of representatives ==
Diplomatic agrément/Diplomatic accreditation	ambassador	Observations	List of heads of state of Mongolia	Premier of the People's Republic of China	Term end
October 16, 1949		The governments in Beijing and Ulaanbaatar established diplomatic relations.	Gonchigiin Bumtsend	Zhou Enlai	
July 1, 1950	Bayaryn Jargalsaikhan		Gonchigiin Bumtsend	Zhou Enlai	July 1, 1953
July 1, 1953	Bayanbatoryn Ochirbat		Gonchigiin Bumtsend	Zhou Enlai	May 1, 1957
May 1, 1957	Sonomyn Luvsan		Jamsrangiin Sambuu	Zhou Enlai	June 1, 1959
July 3, 1959	Dendibyn Sharab	*In 1967 He was Dendibyn Sharab, Mongolian Ambassador to Korea, gave a banquet at the Ongnyu Hall on 11 July for the occasion, to which were. *In 1975 he was Mongolian Ambassador in Hanoi	Jamsrangiin Sambuu	Zhou Enlai	August 17, 1962
August 17, 1962	Dondogiin Tsebegmid	* In 1976 he was vice-chairman of the council of ministers	Jamsrangiin Sambuu	Zhou Enlai	July 24, 1971
July 24, 1971	Sandagiyn Sosorbaram	Vice Minister of Foreign Affairs, 1980: The previous Minister of Culture, Sandagiyn Sosorbaram, suddenly lost the job — and his secretaryship of the ruling People's Revolutionary Party Central Committee, because of his health, and was sent as Ambassador to Warsaw.	Jamsrangiin Sambuu	Zhou Enlai	November 11, 1976
November 11, 1976	Lutyn Chuluunbaatar		Yumjaagiin Tsedenbal	Hua Guofeng	June 28, 1982
June 28, 1982	Puntsagyn Shagdarsuren		Yumjaagiin Tsedenbal	Zhao Ziyang	
May 21, 1987	Nyamyn Luvsanchultem	Ambassador to Moscow (announced February 18, 1964).	Jambyn Batmönkh	Li Peng	
June 15, 1995	Dagvyn Tsahilgaan	Mongolia appointed a new ambassador to China, Dagvyn Tsahilgaan. He was the MPRP's leading ideologist before the reform process began. In June and October, Mongolia protested against Chinese nuclear tests.	Punsalmaagiin Ochirbat	Li Peng	
June 1, 2001	Luvsandagvyn Amarsanaa	(*1953 in Erdenebulgan)	Natsagiin Bagabandi	Zhu Rongji	
October 24, 2005	Galsan Batsukh		Nambaryn Enkhbayar	Wen Jiabao	
January 11, 2010	Tsedenjav Sukhbaatar		Tsakhiagiin Elbegdorj	Wen Jiabao	August 4, 2016
September 14, 2016	Damba Gankhuyag		Tsakhiagiin Elbegdorj	Li Keqiang	
