= China–Indochina Peninsula economic corridor =

Corridor of the Belt and Road Initiative

The ASEAN-China Free Trade Area

The China-Indochina Peninsula economic corridor (CICPEC) is an economic corridor initiated in 2010 and incorporated later into the Belt and Road Initiative. It was known before as the Nanning-Singapore Economic Corridor.

The economic corridor connects several cities in Southern China with the major cities of Southeast Asia including Hanoi in Vietnam, Vientiane in Laos, Phnom Penh in Cambodia, Bangkok in Thailand, Kuala Lumpur in Malaysia, and Singapore with modern road, rail, and pipelines. The corridor is planned to better connect neighbouring economies, and encourage development across the ASEAN–China Free Trade Area.

== Development ==
One of the first steps is the Nanning–Pingxiang high-speed line, a railway in Guangxi province in southern China, which would form the northern end of the corridor. A 5000 km Nanning-Singapore railway is planned.
