= China–Central Asia–West Asia Economic Corridor =

Transportation corridor in Asia and Europe

The China–Central Asia–West Asia Economic Corridor (abbreviated as CCAWEC or CCAWAEC) is an economic and transportation corridor of the Belt and Road Initiative, a global economic connectivity program led by China. The corridor was one of the 6 land corridors articulated in the initial vision for the BRI in 2015. It has since the 2nd Belt and Road Forum in 2019 become one of 35 corridors and project officially included in the BRI. This is a crucial economic and transportation corridor that crosses the South Caucasus and Central Asia, linking China with Europe.

== Countries ==
Academic researchers have variously included the countries of Central Asia, the Caucasus, Middle East, Balkans and Turkey as part of the corridor. A report on the BRI by the OECD in 2018 classifies the following long list of countries as part of the corridor: Albania, Armenia, Azerbaijan, Bosnia, Bulgaria, Georgia, Iran, Iraq, Israel, Jordan, Kyrgyzstan, Lebanon, Macedonia, Moldova, Montenegro, the Palestinian Authority, Romania, Serbia, Syria, Tajikistan, Turkey, Turkmenistan, and Uzbekistan.

== Freight route ==
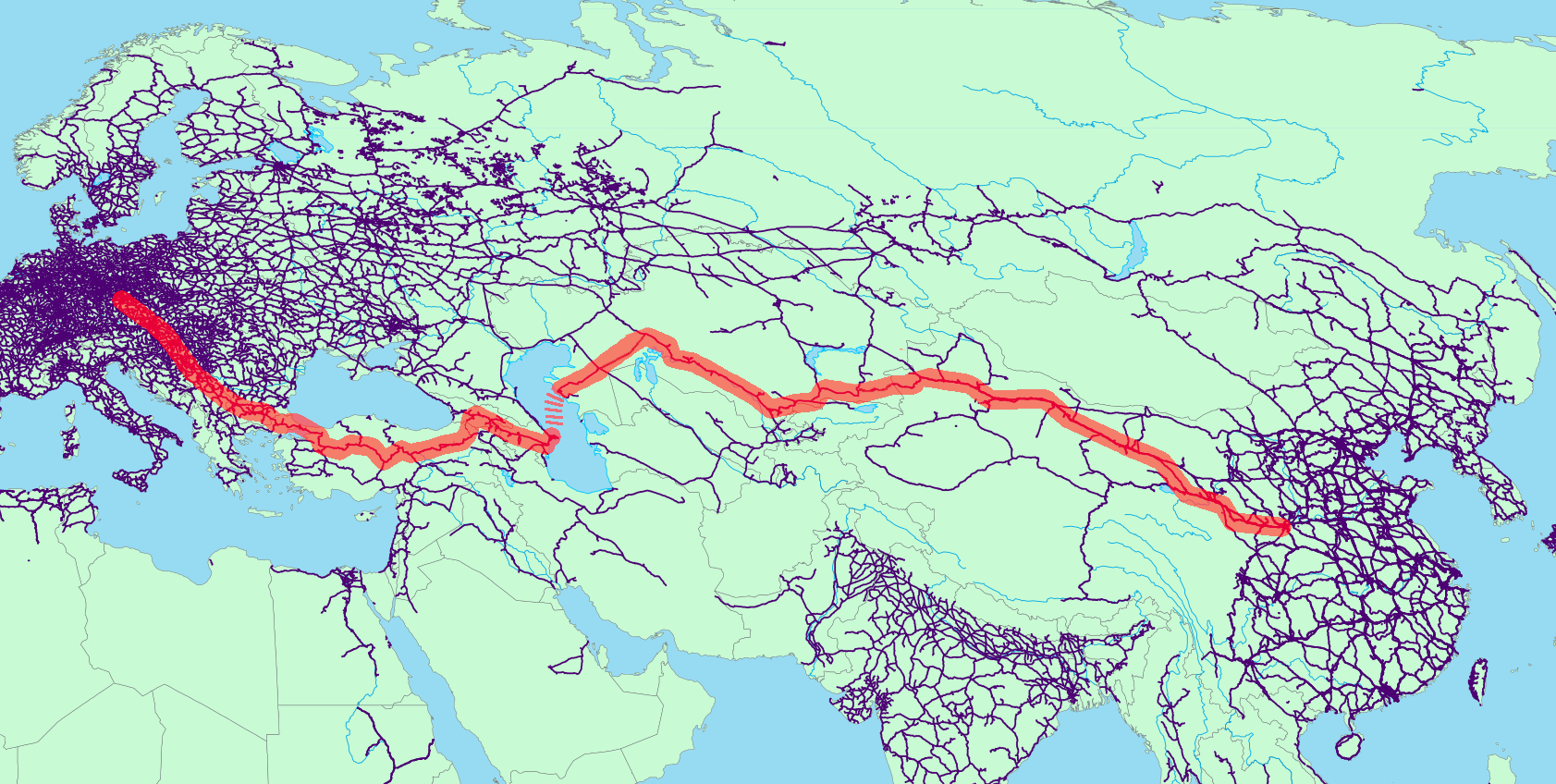
The train route from Xi'an to Prague

The China Railways Express, the first freight train to travel along the corridor, made its maiden trip in November 2016 from China (Xi'an) to Europe (Prague) in 18 days. The railway service traveled from China to Kazakhstan, Azerbaijan (using train ferries to cross the Caspian Sea from Kazakhstan), Georgia, Turkey (passing through Istanbul's Marmaray Tunnel under the Bosphorus) before arriving in Central Europe. Travelling at an average speed of 40 km/h.

== Related initiatives ==
The areas covered by the corridor overlaps with several other regional transportation initiatives. The Baku–Tbilisi–Kars railway going through Azerbaijan, Georgia, and Turkey is nicknamed the "Iron Silk Road". The railway line and the Port of Baku rail head are both included in the list BRI corridors and projects. A columnist for the Turkish newspaper Hürriyet saw the railway line as joining with the BRI in the region and challenging Russia's own BRI connected corridor as a primary corridor from China to Europe.

== Significance ==
CCAWEC provides an alternative land route between China and Europe which avoids Russian territory.
