= Belt and Road Initiative =

Chinese global infrastructure project

- 一带一路
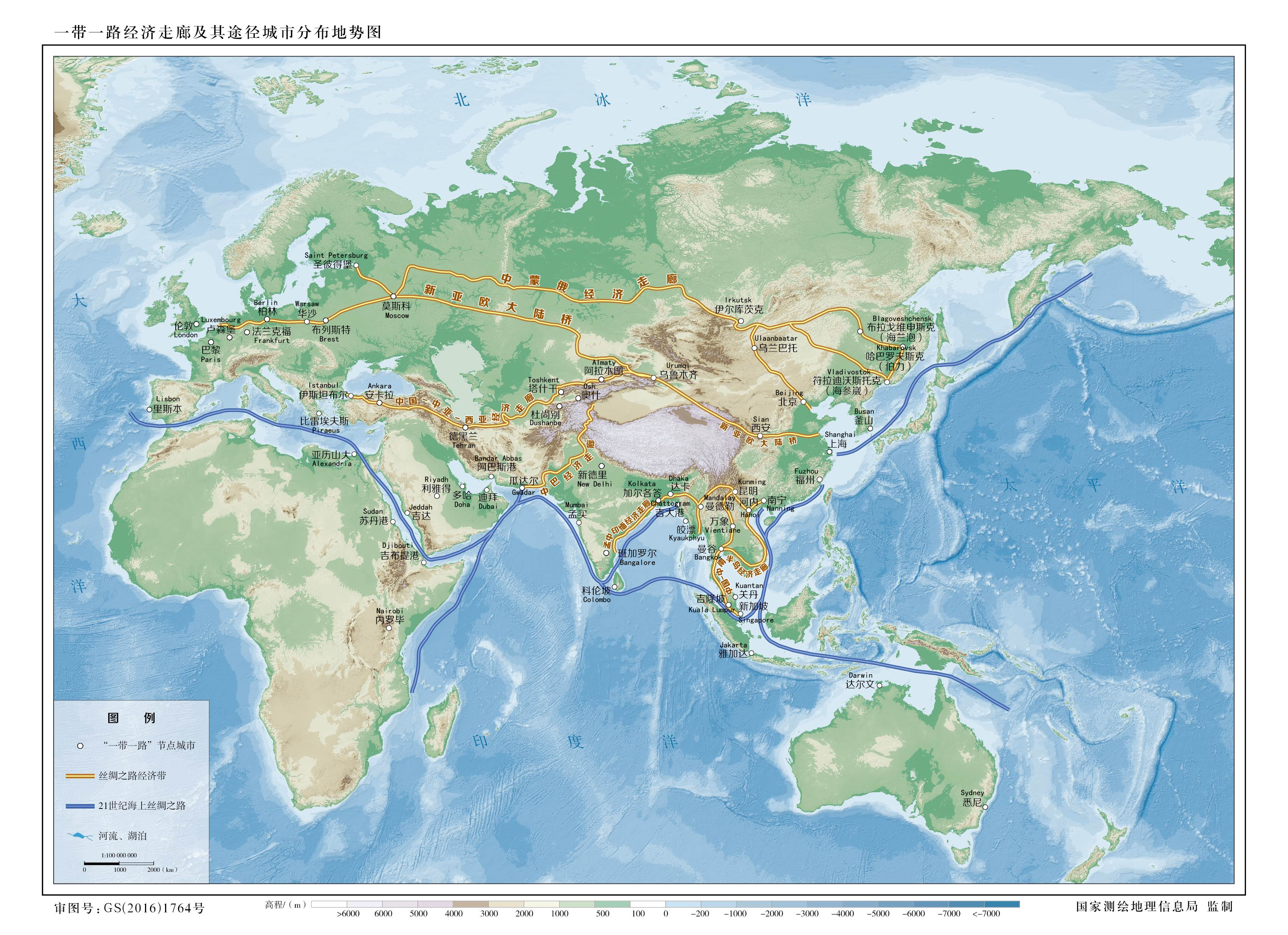
- Topographic map of the Belt and Road Economic Corridor and its pathway cities
- Abbreviation: BRI
- Formation: 2013; 13 years ago (inception)
- Founder: China
- Legal status: Active
- Headquarters: Beijing, China
- Location: Worldwide
- Main organ: Belt and Road Construction Leadership Group; National Development and Reform Commission
- Website: www.yidaiyilu.gov.cn

The Silk Road Economic Belt and the 21st-century Maritime Silk Road
- Simplified Chinese: 丝绸之路经济带和21世纪海上丝绸之路
- Traditional Chinese: 絲綢之路經濟帶和21世紀海上絲綢之路
Transcriptions
Standard Mandarin
- Hanyu Pinyin: Sīchóu zhī lù jīngjìdài hé èrshíyī shìjì hǎishàng sīchóu zhī lù
Yue: Cantonese
- Jyutping: si^{1} cau^{4} zi^{1} lou^{6} ging^{1} zai^{3} daai^{3} wo^{4} ji^{6} sap^{6} jat^{1} sai^{3} gei^{2} hoi^{2} soeng^{6} si^{1} cau^{4} zi^{1} lou^{6}
Southern Min
- Hokkien POJ: si-tiû-chi-lo͘ keng-chè-tài hô jī-si̍p-it sè-kí hái-siōng si-tiû-chi-lo͘

One Belt, One Road (OBOR)
- Simplified Chinese: 一带一路
- Traditional Chinese: 一帶一路
Transcriptions
Standard Mandarin
- Hanyu Pinyin: Yídài yílù
Yue: Cantonese
- Jyutping: jat^{1} daai^{3} jat^{1} lou^{6}
Southern Min
- Hokkien POJ: It-tài It-lō͘

The Belt and Road Initiative (BRI or B&R), also known as One Belt One Road (Chinese: 一带一路; pinyin: Yīdài Yīlù) and sometimes called the New Silk Road, is a global infrastructure and economic development strategy pursued by the government of China since 2013. It includes projects in more than 150 countries spanning ports, railways, highways, power stations, aviation, and telecommunications.

Chinese leader Xi Jinping announced the initiative during visits to Kazakhstan and Indonesia in 2013. It consists of six overland economic corridors, known collectively as the Silk Road Economic Belt, and the sea-based 21st Century Maritime Silk Road. Flagship projects include the China–Pakistan Economic Corridor, the Boten–Vientiane railway, the Jakarta-Bandung high-speed rail line, and the ports of Piraeus, Hambantota, and Gwadar.

Supporters describe the BRI as a way to close infrastructure gaps and boost trade and growth in developing economies. Critics have raised concerns about its environmental impact, governance and labor standards, debt sustainability, and the dual-use potential of some infrastructure. Accusations that China uses the BRI for "debt-trap diplomacy" are widely disputed by researchers.

== Background ==
China's overseas investment dates to the 1950s, with projects in North Korea, Vietnam, and several African countries. Africa, where China backed independence movements, received 58% of Chinese economic aid between 1956 and 1969. These investments stayed small because of the Mao-era emphasis on self-reliance. After Deng Xiaoping launched reform and opening up in December 1978, China began moving toward a market economy. Under Jiang Zemin, the Go Out policy encouraged Chinese construction firms to work abroad. The BRI expanded that policy and also built on Jiang's China Western Development program.

Xi Jinping first announced the concept as the "Silk Road Economic Belt" in a speech at Nazarbayev University in Astana, Kazakhstan, on 7 September 2013. The following month, in a speech in Indonesia, he proposed a "21st-Century Maritime Silk Road" to deepen cooperation with Southeast Asia and beyond.

=== Initiative name ===
The official name for the initiative is the Silk Road Economic Belt and 21st-Century Maritime Silk Road Development Strategy (丝绸之路经济带和21世纪海上丝绸之路发展战略), which was initially abbreviated as the One Belt One Road (Chinese: 一带一路) or the OBOR strategy. The English translation has been changed to the Belt and Road Initiative (BRI) since 2016, when the Chinese government considered the emphasis on the words "one" and "strategy" were prone to misinterpretation and suspicion, so they opted for the more inclusive term "initiative" in its translation. However, "One Belt One Road" is still the reference term in Chinese-language media.

== Objectives ==
The BRI is a large-scale development strategy intended to expand infrastructure and trade connectivity across many countries. For China, it opens new markets for Chinese firms, moves excess industrial capacity overseas, secures access to resources, and strengthens ties with partner countries. Chinese loans usually fund projects built by Chinese companies, so the initiative generates its own export demand. Its overland routes are also meant to help China's less developed western regions catch up with the east. For developing countries, the BRI offers infrastructure, finance, and technical assistance that can ease their economic disadvantages relative to Western countries, with potential gains in employment and poverty reduction.

The initiative has been compared to the post-war Marshall Plan. Simon Curtis and Ian Klaus describe it as the largest infrastructure investment by a great power since then. China deliberately keeps the initiative's framing flexible so it can adapt to new priorities. For example, it added a "Health Silk Road" during the COVID-19 pandemic.

Many analysts also see the BRI as a way to extend Chinese political influence, and some frame it through Halford Mackinder's heartland theory. Official Chinese media play down these strategic dimensions. Domestically, the initiative also guides the policies of Chinese provinces and ministries. Economist Keyu Jin argues that, besides advancing China's strategic interests, it reflects the CCP's vision of a "community of shared future". A 2025 study of China in the Middle East describes the BRI as a soft-power instrument that works through digital, cultural, and educational projects.

Security concerns are part of the picture as well. The BRI has been linked to China's efforts to reduce its exposure to choke points such as the Strait of Malacca (the "Malacca dilemma") and to blunt the U.S. island chain strategy. A 2023 AidData study found that some overseas ports with heavy BRI investment raise dual-use concerns and could suit future Chinese naval bases. David H. Shinn and Joshua Eisenman argue that China seeks to strengthen its strategic position and reduce U.S. military influence. In their view, however, BRI activity is unlikely to lead to American-style overseas bases, and dual-use ports may be a way of avoiding the need for purely military facilities.

Academics Lyle Goldstein and Vitaly Kozyrev write that China's initial motivations for the BRI included its "desire to stabilize the global economic system by reducing the risks of the hegemonic neoliberal model." In contrast to the neoliberal model, the BRI places greater emphasis on building public infrastructure and connectivity.

Developing Xinjiang is also a stated goal. The region borders eight countries and lies on the main overland routes to Central Asia. Some analysts argue that the Chinese government regards radical Islamic influences from BRI partner states as threats to the initiative. They link these concerns to the government's policies in the region.

After 2014, BRI implementation has emphasized the "five connectivities" of policy coordination, infrastructure connectivity, trade facilitation, financial integration, and people-to-people exchanges.

== Leadership ==
A leading group was formed sometime in late 2014, and its leadership line-up publicized on 1 February 2015. This steering committee reports directly into the State Council of China and is composed of several political heavyweights, evidence of the importance of the program to the government. Then Vice-Premier Zhang Gaoli, who was also a member of the 7-man CCP Politburo Standing Committee, was named leader of the group, and Wang Huning, Wang Yang, Yang Jing, and Yang Jiechi named deputy leaders.

On 28 March 2015, the Chinese government published Vision and Actions on Jointly Building Silk Road Economic Belt and 21st-Century Maritime Silk Road, which outlined the principles, framework, key areas of cooperation and cooperation mechanisms of the initiative. The BRI is considered a central element within China's foreign policy, and was incorporated into the CCP's constitution in 2017 during its 19th Congress. The BRI represents a set of policies for Chinese engagement with the global South, including diversifying resource and energy supplies, building loan-funded infrastructure using Chinese companies, creating new markets for Chinese companies, and engaging global South countries simultaneously at bilateral and regional levels.

With regard to China and the African countries, the Forum on China–Africa Cooperation (FOCAC) is a significant multilateral cooperation mechanism for facilitating BRI projects. The China–Arab States Cooperation Forum (CASCF) serves a similar coordinating role with regard to BRI projects in the Arab states.

== Membership ==
Countries in the Belt and Road Initiative are in dark green, countries that have officially withdrawn are in light green, and countries that have de facto withdrawn but still have active MoUs or other agreements are in yellow.

Countries join the BRI by signing a memorandum of understanding with China, and the Chinese government lists participants on its Belt and Road Portal. As of May 2025, Fudan University's Green Finance & Development Center counted between 146 and 150 member states.

A few countries have withdrawn from the BRI, formally or de facto. Lithuania in 2021, and Estonia and Latvia in 2022, left the 17+1 cooperation format and let their BRI agreements lapse. The Philippines dropped its BRI projects in November 2023 amid rising tensions with China. Italy, the only G7 member to have joined, declined to renew its MoU, which expired in March 2024. Panama withdrew in February 2025.

== Financing ==
Most BRI financing takes the form of loans. China is the world's largest bilateral lender, and its loans are often secured with collateral such as receivables in a bank account. The policy banks, the China Development Bank and the Export–Import Bank of China, play the central role in funding BRI projects. State-owned commercial banks also lend heavily. The Bank of China lent more than US$185 billion for BRI projects between 2015 and 2020, and the Industrial and Commercial Bank of China had lent more than US$100 billion by April 2019. State-owned enterprises both finance and build projects. In 2024 they regained a dominant share of BRI investment, led by Sinopec, PowerChina, and China National Chemical Engineering.

The multilateral Asian Infrastructure Investment Bank (AIIB), first proposed in October 2013, was explicitly linked to the BRI at its founding. It later broadened its lending to countries outside the initiative.

In 2017, China, the World Bank, and other international development funding bodies signed a BRI memorandum of understanding, which provides for collaboration on developing sustainable financial mechanisms, coordination and capacity building, and transparency of funding terms.

China's loans and BRI projects require fewer political conditions from its partner countries than Western aid packages. Academics Min Ye and Jorge Heine write that this lack of political conditionality "has enabled China to frame itself as a collaborative development partner, aligning its infrastructure investments with the priorities of recipient countries rather than imposing externally defined terms." China's infrastructure lending has also increased the level of policy autonomy that the developing countries it lends to have at the World Bank. A study by academic Diego Hernandez finds that countries which received loans from China had 15% fewer lending conditions for every percentage point increase in Chinese development finance.

=== Investment funds ===
China established the Silk Road Fund in December 2014 with capital of US$40 billion and RMB 100 billion. It invests in infrastructure, resources, energy, and industrial and financial cooperation, and its first project was the Karot Hydropower Project in Pakistan. The sovereign wealth fund China Investment Corporation (CIC) invests in BRI projects and related funds, including the Silk Road Fund, and helps Chinese companies make foreign acquisitions. Its domestic subsidiary Central Huijin supports the state banks that finance many projects.

China has also set up joint funds with partner countries, such as one established with Mubadala in the United Arab Emirates.

=== Debt sustainability debate ===
China signed on to the G20 Operational Guidelines for Sustainable Financing in 2017 and to the G20 Principles for Quality Infrastructure Investment in 2019. The Center for Global Development described China's subsequent debt sustainability framework as "virtually identical" to that of the World Bank and IMF. Jeremy Garlick argues that for many poor countries China is the best available source of development finance. He notes that Western investors and the World Bank have been reluctant to lend to states such as Pakistan, Cambodia, Tajikistan, and Montenegro, and that BRI lending is no worse for borrowers' debt than lending by the IMF or the Paris Club.

US officials have characterized BRI lending as debt-trap diplomacy. In August 2023 President Joe Biden called the initiative "basically a debt and noose agreement". The idea has been debunked by academics. Many researchers have found no evidence that China deliberately pursues such a strategy. Deborah Bräutigam and Meg Rithmire note that Chinese banks have restructured loans but have never seized an asset from a borrowing country, and Yan Hairong and Barry Sautman reach the same conclusion. Kerry Brown observes that Sri Lanka's Hambantota International Port, often cited as a debt-trap case, has instead drawn China into further spending, risk, and complex local politics.

Other assessments are more critical. A 2025 Lowy Institute study found that 54 developing countries now owe more in debt repayments to China than to Paris Club countries. It concluded that Chinese lending has been a driver of debt sustainability problems in many of them. An analysis of BRI loans from 2007 to 2022 found that they made bond market borrowing more expensive for debtor countries.

== Infrastructure networks ==
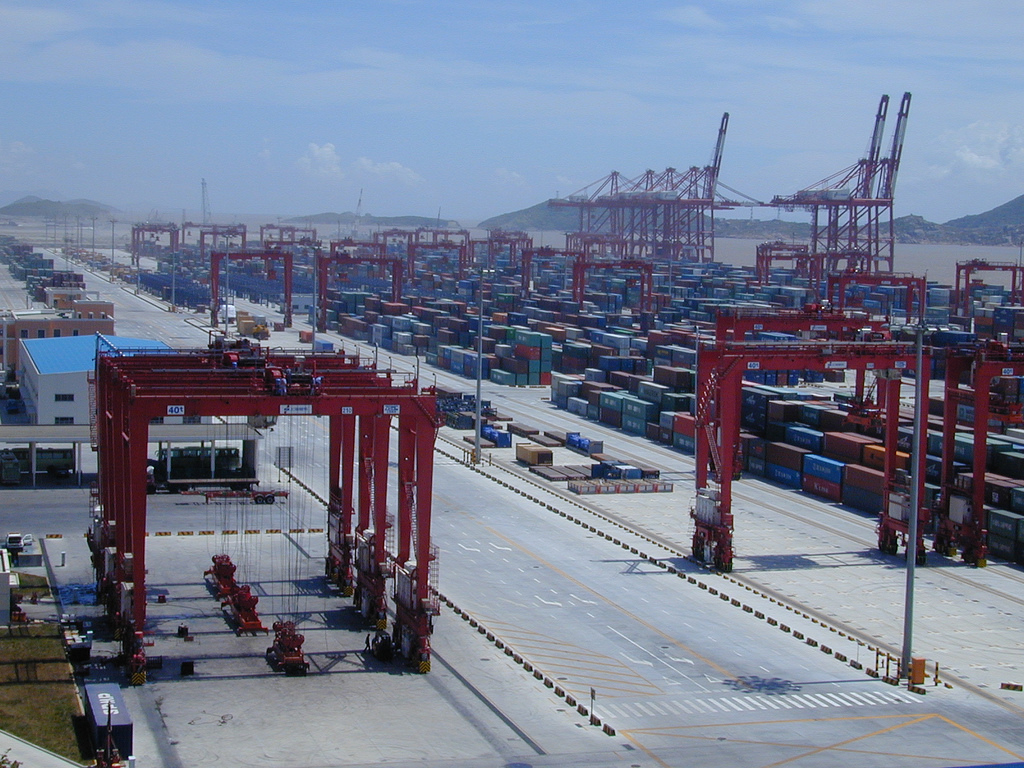
Yangshan Port, Shanghai

The BRI was first set out as a set of overland economic corridors linked by road, rail, energy, and digital infrastructure, together with a Maritime Silk Road built around ports. The 2015 Vision and Actions document mapped these corridors, and also called for "soft" infrastructure such as trade agreements and common commercial rules. In practice, the early BRI was dominated by large, loan-financed megaprojects. According to China Global Investment Tracker data, projects costing more than US$1 billion made up 18% of BRI projects but 56% of BRI investment between 2005 and 2022.

Since about 2021, Beijing has promoted a "small and beautiful" model, with new projects intended to be smaller, greener, and less financially risky. Investment has shifted toward technology, energy, and health care. Private firms and provincial governments have taken on larger financing roles. At the third Belt and Road Forum in October 2023, Xi pledged to pursue both "signature projects" and "small yet smart" livelihood programs, including 1,000 small-scale assistance projects.

=== Overland corridors ===
The main land corridors are:

- The China–Pakistan Economic Corridor (CPEC) is the most developed corridor. It is a US$62 billion program of transport and energy projects in Pakistan. It became partly operational in November 2016, when Chinese cargo was first shipped overland to Gwadar Port, and it gives China a trade route that bypasses the Strait of Malacca.
- The New Eurasian Land Bridge, which runs from western China through Kazakhstan, Russia, Belarus, and Poland to Germany. Astana is a major hub for the corridor. At the Khorgos dry port on the China–Kazakhstan border, rail cargo transfers from Chinese standard gauge to the wider gauge used in the former Soviet Union.
- The China–Mongolia–Russia Economic Corridor, which runs from northern China to the Russian Far East.
- The China–Central Asia–West Asia Corridor, which runs from western China to Turkey.
- The China-Indochina Peninsula economic corridor, which runs from southern China to Singapore.

A sixth corridor, the Bangladesh–China–India–Myanmar Economic Corridor, was described in 2015 as closely related to the BRI. It was dropped from the project list in 2019 because India refused to participate. Other links have since been proposed, such as the Trans-Himalayan Multi-dimensional Connectivity Network with Nepal.

Rail freight is central to the overland routes. As of 2024, services branded as China Railway Express linked about 60 Chinese cities with about 50 European cities. Their use surged after the COVID-19 pandemic disrupted air and sea freight, and by 2022 China had built cross-border highways to almost every neighboring region.

=== Maritime Silk Road ===
Xi proposed the Maritime Silk Road in an October 2013 speech to the Indonesian parliament. It runs from the Chinese coast through the South China Sea and the Indian Ocean to East Africa, then through the Suez Canal to the Mediterranean. Estimates in 2019 found that most BRI-related trade still moved by sea, mainly because container shipping costs less than overland rail. The port of Piraeus in Greece is the most successful BRI port project as of 2024, and it has helped China strengthen ties with Greece. In Kenya, China has built rail and road links from the port of Mombasa inland to Nairobi.

=== Digital Silk Road ===
Announced by Xi in 2015, the Digital Silk Road covers digital infrastructure, technology development, and technical standards. It also reduces China's reliance on American technology. Between 2017 and 2022, China built 34 terrestrial cables and dozens of undersea cables in 12 BRI countries. Much of this work targets parts of the global South where private providers and local governments have not built digital infrastructure. Both state and private firms take part, with Alibaba a major technology supplier.

Critics say the program exports Chinese surveillance and censorship technology. The 2024 I-Soon leak revealed a hacking campaign against critical infrastructure in partner countries. A 2024 literature review found that many of these concerns are speculative, but also that there is little specific evidence yet of the program's positive local economic impact.

=== Other components ===
Alongside its land and sea corridors, the BRI has expanded into several thematic "silk roads" covering Arctic shipping, air freight, health care, and space, as well as energy networks and cultural and educational exchanges.

The Polar Silk Road, also called the Ice Silk Road, follows the Arctic Northern Sea Route along Russia's northern coast. Russia and China agreed to develop it in 2017. COSCO has since made trial voyages on the route, and Chinese and Russian firms cooperate on Arctic oil and gas exploration. The route gained new importance in 2026. The US and Israeli war on Iran in February effectively closed the Strait of Hormuz, and Houthi threats continued to disrupt traffic through the Bab-el-Mandeb, so shippers looked for ways around these maritime chokepoints. In August 2026 the Chinese carrier Sea Legend launched its first regular container service through the Arctic. The service connects Ningbo with Felixstowe in the United Kingdom in about 20 days, roughly half the time of the route through the Suez Canal.

The Air Silk Road connects Zhengzhou, the capital of Henan province, with Luxembourg. Cargo flights between the two began in 2014. The Health Silk Road covers cooperation in public health, from building hospitals to producing medicines. China gave it particular prominence during the COVID-19 pandemic. Chinese drugmakers have also opened factories in Africa, which imports more than 90% of its medicines.

Under the Belt and Road Space Information Corridor, set out in official guidance in 2016, China offers partner countries communications, remote-sensing, and navigation services from its satellite network. China's main state space contractor describes the resulting network of satellites and ground stations as a "space silk road". China has built and launched satellites for partners including Bolivia, Laos, and Pakistan, and its BeiDou navigation system provides services across BRI countries. Remote-sensing data from these satellites support weather forecasting, disaster prevention, and responses to climate change.

China has also proposed an Asian super grid linking six ultra-high-voltage grids across China and the rest of Asia. It would carry renewable power, such as wind energy from Central Asia, over long distances.

People-to-people ties are one of the five areas of cooperation set out in the 2015 Vision and Actions document. Education has been central to this work. In 2013, Xi announced 30,000 scholarships for citizens of Shanghai Cooperation Organisation members and 10,000 for students and teachers from Belt and Road countries. In 2016 China's Ministry of Education issued an education action plan for the BRI and created the Silk Road Chinese government scholarship. Chinese universities have formed BRI alliances such as the University Alliance of the Silk Road, led by Xi'an Jiaotong University, which had 135 member universities by 2017.

== Projects ==
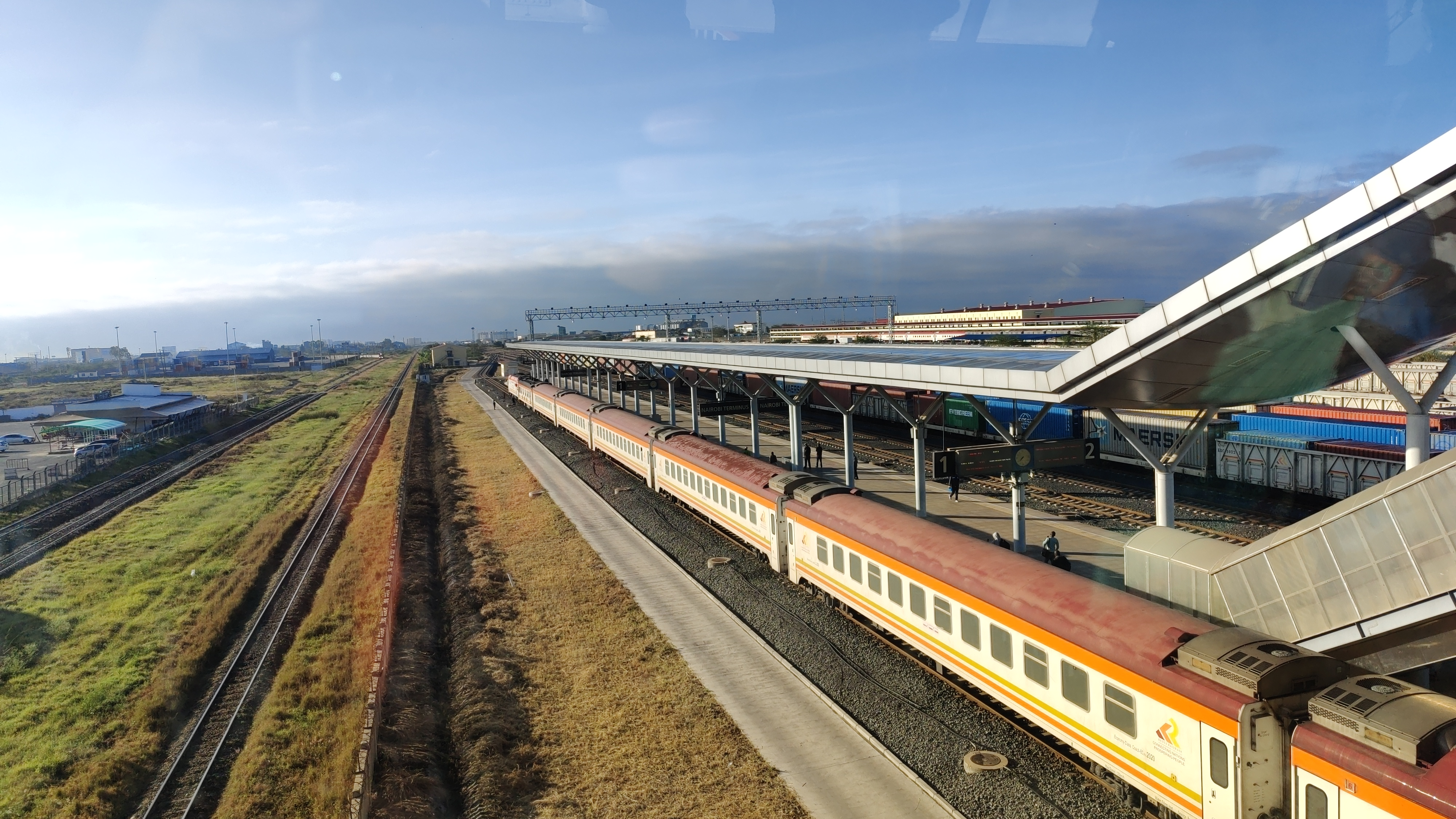
Train station in Nairobi, Kenya built with BRI funding in 2017

The BRI includes projects in about 150 countries. Officially the initiative's framing is flexible so it can adapt to new priorities. Flagship projects include the China–Pakistan Economic Corridor, the Boten–Vientiane railway in Laos, the Jakarta-Bandung high-speed rail line in Indonesia, and the ports of Piraeus, Hambantota, and Gwadar.

Railways are among the BRI's most visible undertakings. The Jakarta–Bandung line opened in October 2023 as Southeast Asia's first high-speed railway. The Boten–Vientiane railway, the Laotian section of a line linking Kunming with Vientiane, opened in December 2021 after five years of construction. The line closed the last gap in a continuous rail network between western Europe and Singapore. In Central Asia, the China–Kyrgyzstan–Uzbekistan railway is under construction. The China–Europe Railway Express began in 2011, before the BRI was launched, and passed 140,000 trips in October 2026. As of 2026, it connects to six countries in continental Europe and twenty-fix key transportation hubs in China from Chongqing in the west, to Yiwu in the east, and Dongguan in the South.

=== Environmental concerns ===
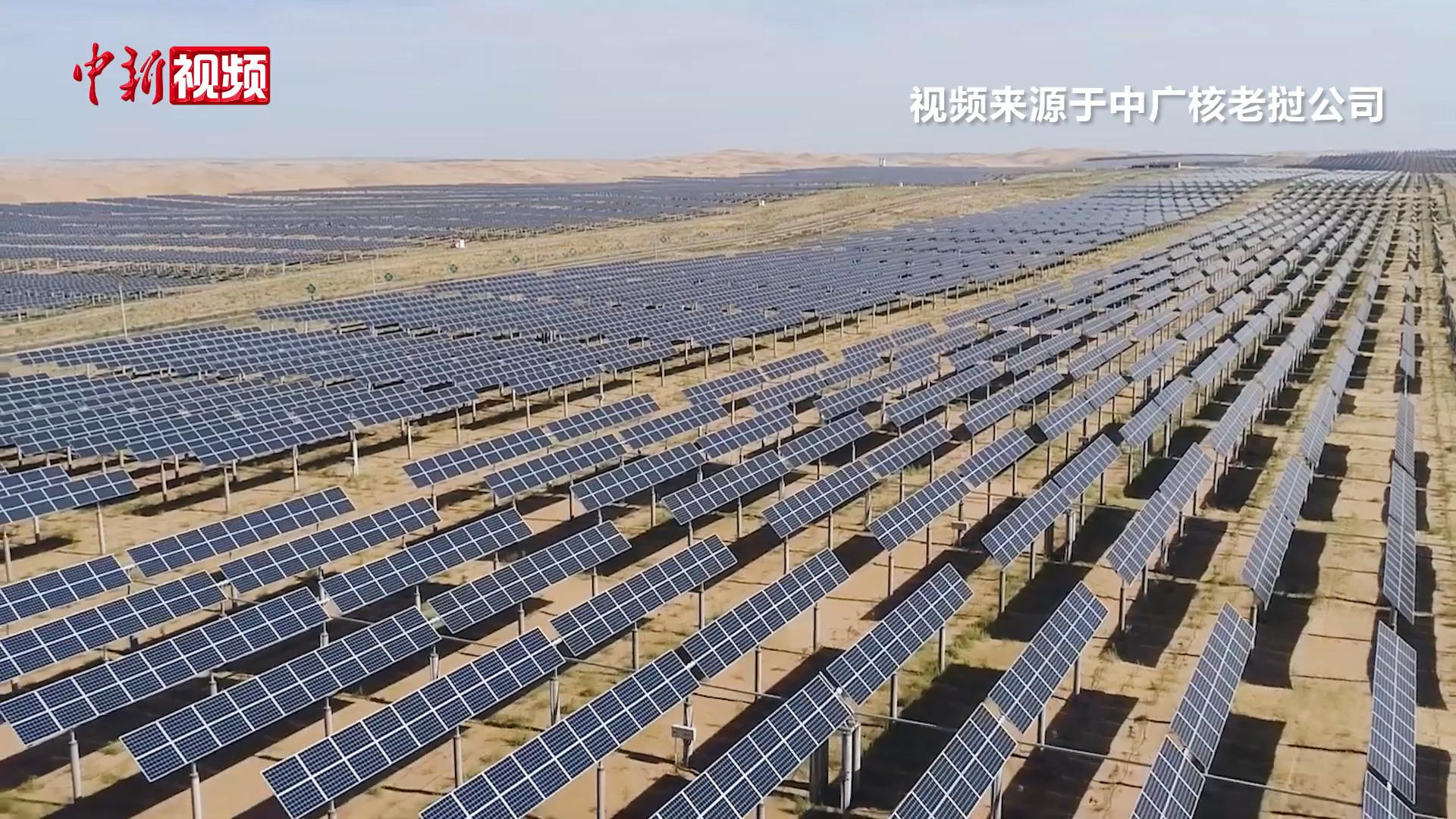
A solar panel array in Laos built with BRI funding

The BRI has attracted attention from environmental organizations. A joint report by the World Wide Fund for Nature and HSBC identified significant risks alongside opportunities for sustainable development, including overuse of natural resources, ecosystem disruption, and pollutant emissions. Coal-fired power stations built under the BRI, such as Emba Hunutlu power station in Turkey, have increased greenhouse gas emissions. BRI coal projects accounted for 42% of China's overseas investment in 2018, and 93% of energy investments from the BRI-linked Silk Road Fund went to fossil fuels. Central Asian nations face particular concerns including glacier melting, endangered species preservation, desertification, soil erosion from overgrazing and over-farming, mining practices, water resource management, and air and water pollution from poorly planned infrastructure. Maritime infrastructure development could impact sensitive species and habitats including coral reefs, mangroves, seagrass meadows, and saltmarshes. Critics have also raised concerns about pollution outsourcing to poorer nations whose governments may disregard environmental consequences; in Serbia, where pollution-related deaths already top Europe, Chinese-owned coal plants have increased coal dependency and contributed to air and soil pollution.

After 2019, BRI projects increasingly emphasized concepts of sustainability, green development, and multilateralism. Many partner countries prioritize sustainable development, and China has responded by emphasizing a "Green Silk Road" and framing ecological civilization as integral to the initiative. The Belt and Road Initiative International Green Development Coalition (BRIGC), launched at the 2nd Belt and Road Forum for International Cooperation in April 2019, aims to integrate environmental sustainability and international standards across BRI priorities. Scholars remain uncertain whether these practices will be implemented, as all BRI-specific environmental goals appear in informal guidelines rather than legally binding regulations, and member nations may prioritize economic development over environmental protection.

BRI projects have trended towards greener and more sustainable development in the period since the COVID-19 pandemic. In September 2021, Xi Jinping announced China would "step up support" for developing countries to adopt green energy and cease financing overseas coal plants. This pledge has faced scrutiny: in January 2023, Pakistan approved a Chinese-funded 300 MW coal plant in Gwadar, and in January 2024, a 380 MW coal plant began operation in Sulawesi, Indonesia.

According to the Green Finance & Development Center, 2023 was China's "greenest" year for BRI investment since inception. China devoted US$7.9 billion to solar and wind development—its largest contribution to green energy—with projects in Brazil and Indonesia, plus US$1.9 billion for hydropower including dam projects in Cambodia, Pakistan, Uganda, Tajikistan, Georgia, Myanmar, and Indonesia. At the 2023 Belt and Road Forum, China signed hundreds of BRI-related agreements, with a focus on green technology (as well as digital commerce). As of 2026, China has initiated projects in over 100 countries to develop low-carbon electricity generation through the BRI.

=== Governance issues ===
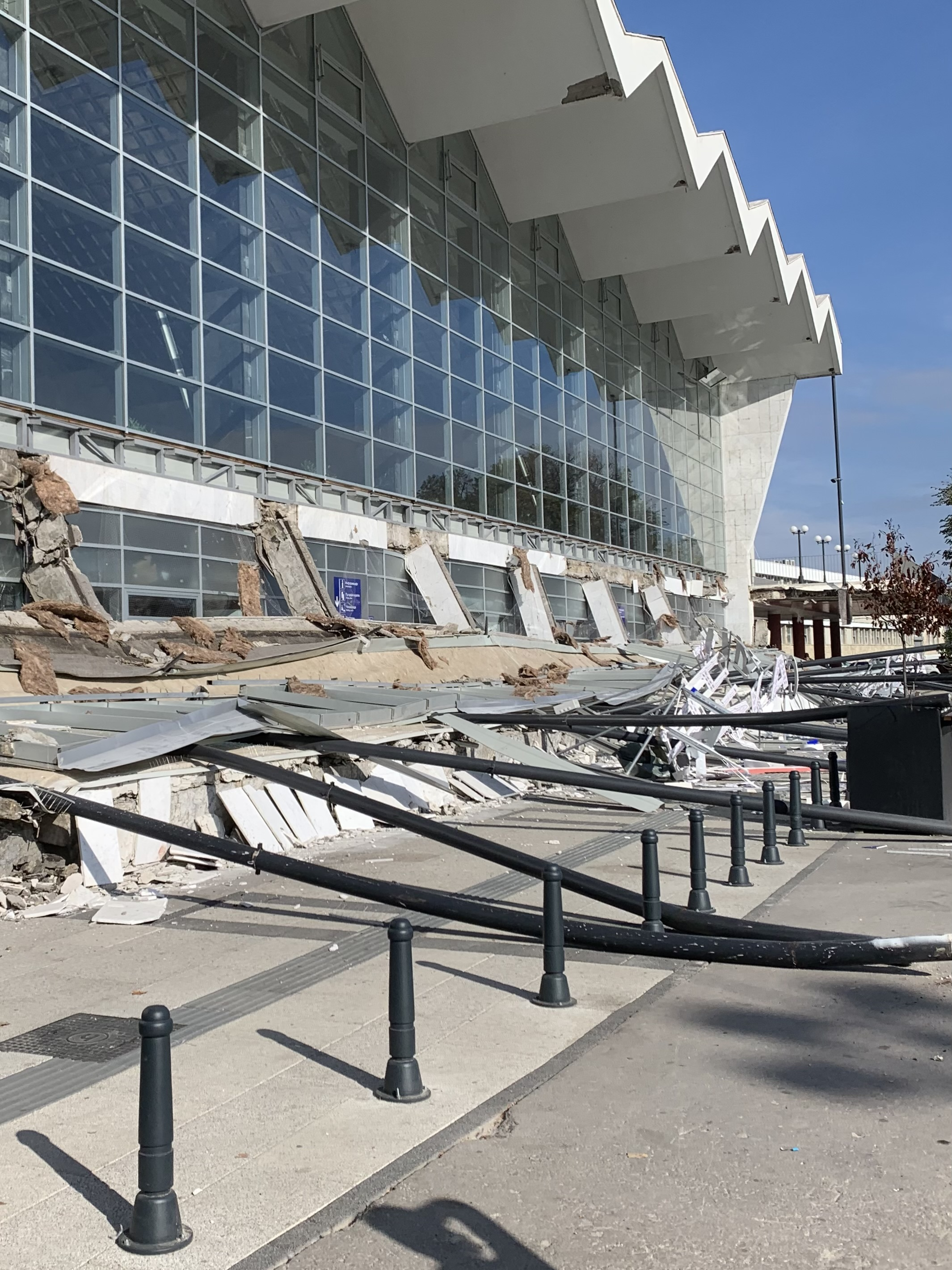
Canopy of Novi Sad railway station after its November 2024 collapse

A 2021 analysis by AidData at the College of William & Mary found that 35% of BRI infrastructure projects encountered major implementation problems including labor violations, corruption, environmental hazards, and public protests. Limited data on corruption and organized crime appears in Chinese government sources, but scholars have documented increased Chinese organized crime syndicate activity in some BRI countries. BRI projects often support connectivity within and between countries; rapid development and integration of border areas has brought security and transnational crime risks in some regions. Criminal groups have in some cases exploited BRI branding to promote projects not endorsed by the Chinese government, such as the Yatai New City project in Myanmar, linked to illegal gambling and online fraud.

The AidData analysis identified Pakistan, Indonesia, Malaysia, Vietnam, Kenya, Kyrgyzstan, Papua New Guinea, Cambodia, Mozambique, and Belarus as the top countries for reported BRI-related corruption scandals. In response to public scandals including the bribery and money laundering conviction of BRI advocate Patrick Ho, the CCP's Central Commission for Discipline Inspection announced in 2019 it would embed officers in participating countries.

A prominent controversy occurred in Serbia. On 1 November 2024, the concrete canopy of Novi Sad railway station collapsed onto a busy pavement, killing 15 people. The 1964 station building had been renovated from 2021 to mid-2024 with BRI support as part of the Budapest–Belgrade railway project, with work completed by a consortium of China Railway International Co., Ltd and China Communications Construction Company, Ltd. The collapse's official cause remains under investigation, with government corruption and opaque dealings with Chinese contractors cited as factors. The incident sparked mass protests throughout Serbia, fueled by broader dissatisfaction with government corruption and media censorship.

Labor practices have also drawn criticism. According to China Labor Watch, widespread human rights violations affect Chinese migrant workers on BRI projects abroad. The report alleges companies confiscate workers' passports upon arrival, compel them to apply for illegal business visas, threaten to report their illegal status if they refuse compliance, deny adequate medical care and rest, restrict personal freedom and speech, force excessive overtime, cancel vacations, delay wages, issue deceptive recruitment advertisements, threaten high damages if workers attempt to leave, provide substandard conditions, and punish those who lead protests.

== Reactions ==
Jeremy Garlick argues that persuading domestic audiences of the BRI's benefits matters more to Beijing than persuading foreign ones, and that this shapes how the initiative is presented.

=== Support ===
By 2020, more than 130 countries had endorsed the initiative. UN Secretary-General António Guterres has said it could accelerate progress toward the Sustainable Development Goals, and several UN bodies have established institutional links with it.

The countries of the Global South generally favor the BRI, viewing its focus on infrastructure development as addressing a need that has gone largely unaddressed by Western entities. BRI initiatives have been embraced by countries in Latin America, Southeast Asia, Central Asia, and Africa. Many African governments see the BRI as a chance to reduce dependence on traditional foreign aid.

Singapore needs no outside infrastructure finance but is a major investor in BRI projects. It supports the initiative to stay globally relevant and to make sure no single country dominates Asian economics.

Former Greek finance minister Yanis Varoufakis praised Chinese negotiators' patience and willingness to seek mutually beneficial deals. Serbia under Aleksandar Vučić has been Europe's strongest BRI supporter.

=== Opposition and counter-initiatives ===
Critics, mainly in non-participating countries such as the United States and India, describe the BRI as a plan for a Sinocentric trade network and an attempt to buy political influence. India objects mainly because CPEC passes through Kashmir, which it says ignores its sovereignty and territorial integrity.

Rival infrastructure programs include:

- the U.S. Free and Open Indo-Pacific strategy;
- the Blue Dot Network, launched by the United States, Japan, and Australia in 2019;
- an EU–Japan connectivity agreement signed in September 2019; and
- the G7's Build Back Better World, launched in 2021.
- India's International North-South Transportation Corridor (INSTC) and the India Middle-East-Europe Economic Corridor (IMEC).

As of 2026, the competing programs have been largely unsuccessful.

According to Reuters, from 2019 the Central Intelligence Agency ran a covert campaign on Chinese social media portraying the BRI as corrupt and wasteful. The campaign also targeted countries where the U.S. and China compete for influence.

=== Mixed and shifting positions ===
Several governments have changed course over time:

- Italy joined in March 2019 with a €2.5 billion MoU, but Prime Minister Giorgia Meloni withdrew in 2023, saying the initiative had brought Italy little benefit. Italian–Chinese trade nonetheless continued to grow into 2024.
- The Philippines moved toward China's position under President Rodrigo Duterte, but dropped BRI projects in 2023.
- Malaysia: Prime Minister Mahathir Mohamad criticized the terms of BRI projects in 2018, comparing them to the unequal treaties once imposed on China. He then endorsed the initiative in 2019, saying it could bring landlocked Central Asian countries closer to the sea.
- Vietnam was long ambivalent but signed a BRI-related cooperation document with China in December 2023.
- Germany and France: German chancellor Angela Merkel and French president Emmanuel Macron said the initiative must be reciprocal rather than run in one direction.
- Australia: the state of Victoria signed a BRI MoU in 2018. The federal government, which said foreign policy was its responsibility, cancelled the agreement in April 2021 as relations with China deteriorated.

=== Assessment indices in China ===
Various efforts in China to quantify the impact of the BRI exist. Peking University has published Belt and Road indices since 2015 which combine bilateral connectivity scores with indicators like political stability and legal infrastructure. Caixin Magazine's introduced its BRI index (analyzing the movement of capital, goods, and people) in 2017. The Development Research Center of the State Council publishes the High-Quality BRI indices, which evaluate on dimensions like economic contribution, social impact, and alignment with international standards. The BRI Policy Research Consortium, led by the Chinese Academy of Sciences, publishes reports evaluating the efficacy of BRI projects based on the five connectivity framework. As of 2026, the BRI Policy Research Consortium model has had the greatest uptake by other institutions and BRI researchers.

== See also ==
- Asia-Africa Growth Corridor
- Asian Highway Network
- Blue Dot Network – counter-initiative by the United States
- Build Back Better World – counter-initiative by the G7
- India-Middle East-Europe Economic Corridor
- Eurasian Land Bridge
- Eurasia Continental Bridge corridor
- International North–South Transport Corridor
- Silk Road
- List of the largest trading partners of China
- New Southern Policy (South Korea)
- Trans-Asian Railway
- K-Silk Road Initiative
